= Chennakesava Perumal Temple =

Perumal temple in Chennai district, Tamil Nadu, India

- சென்னகேசவ பெருமாள் திருக்கோவில்
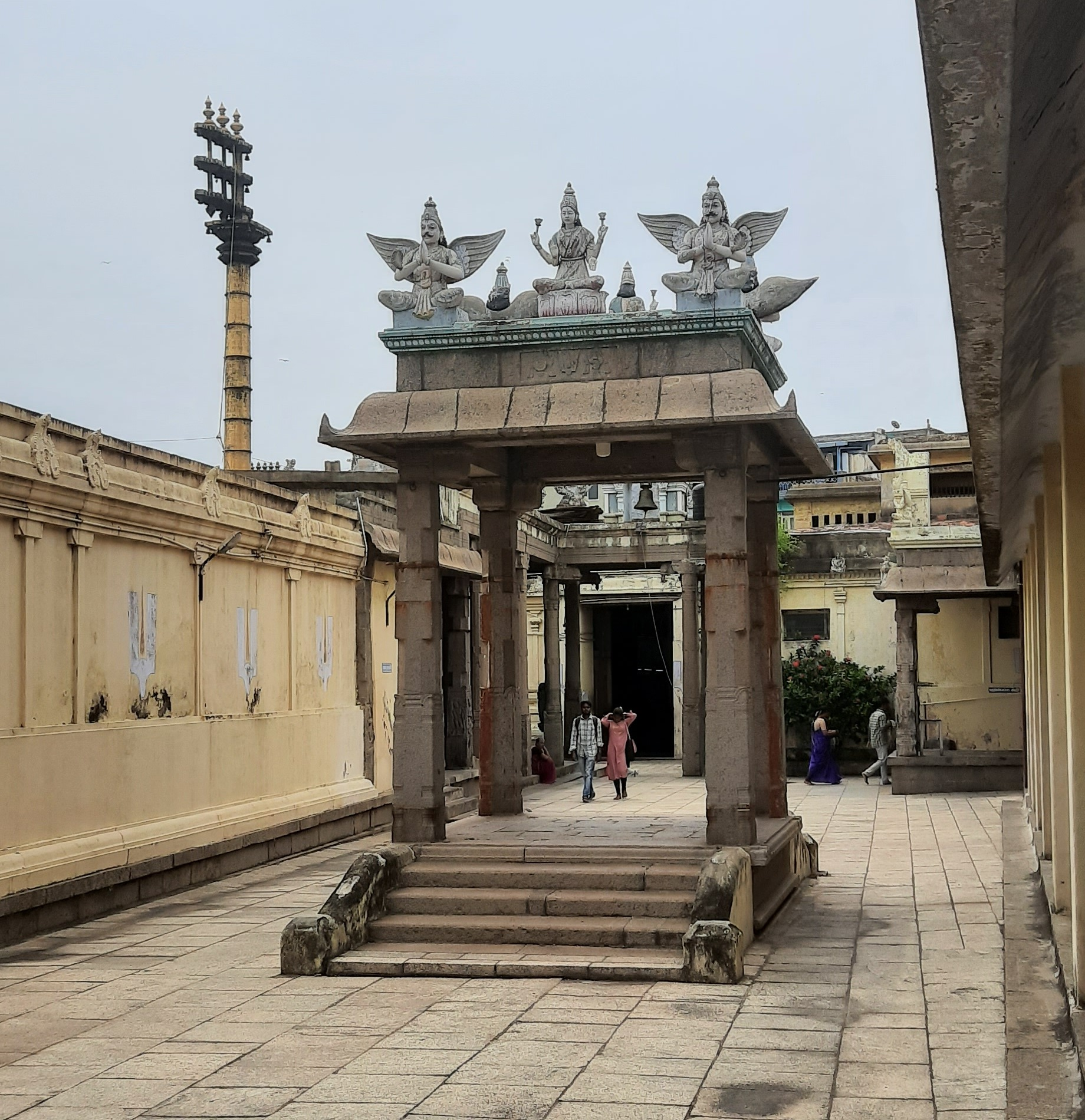
- Chennakesava Perumal Temple

- Location within Tamil Nadu

Religion
- Affiliation: Hinduism
- District: Chennai
- Deity: Chennakesava Perumal (Vishnu) and Chenkamala Valli Thayar (Lakshmi)

Location
- Location: Chennai
- State: Tamil Nadu
- Country: India
- Coordinates: 13°5′2″N 80°16′12″E

Architecture
- Type: Dravidian architecture

Chennakesava Perumal Temple is a Hindu temple situated in the Peddanaickenpettah, George Town neighbourhood of Chennai city, Tamil Nadu, India. It is dedicated to Chenna Kesava Perumal. There is the nearby Chenna Malleeswarar Temple. They are twin temples. The temple was the first to be built in the new settlement; since the construction of Madras city by the British East India Company. Chennakesava Perumal is a manifestation of the Hindu god Vishnu. And considered as the patron deity of Chennai, Chenna pattanam may be named after the Chenna Kesava Perumal Temple. The word "Chenna" in Kannada or Telugu means 'Fair' not to be confused with Tamil or Malayalam word "Chinna", which means 'Small' and the temple was regarded as the main place of the city.

== History ==
Sources about the history of this temple have the following:

- According to Srinivasan, T.A The Original twin temples' ( Chenna kesava perumal and Chenna Malleeswarar ) location was later occupied by the High court building. The original twin temples' history dates back to 1646 CE. Grants made to the original twin temples by Beri Thimmappa (dubash meaning interpreter, to Francis Day) and Nagabattar were recorded. Attack by other European powers and attack and looting of temples by Hyder Ali's forces caused the devotees to relocate some vigrahams to the Thiruneermalai Temple. The twin temples were demolished by the British, for the purpose of security and expansion of the nearby Fort St.George. Manali Muthu Krishna Mudaliar, translator for Lord Piccode, built new twin temples in 1700 CE in a different location (at Devaraja mudali Street, later called Sowcarpet). He donated his lands, used his own funds to build and he refused the money from the British, accepting only land from them.
- According to the official Chenna Kesava temple website: "The original Chenna Kesava perumal temple was located even in the 17th century CE in the place where the Madras High Court is currently located. When the original temple was present, there were a lot of problems in Chennai such as invasion by French and Tippu Sultan. The British East India Company demolished the original temple in 1757 CE. Due to public outcry, the East India Company donated land and some money to Manali Muthu krishna Mudaliar, who built the new Chenna Kesava Perumal temple in the year of 1762, at a different location i.e at Devaraja Mudali Street in Sowcarpet area of Chennai city. Along with this Vishnu temple, he also built a temple for Shiva - Chenna Malleeswarar temple, thus Chennai got twin temples at Sowcarpet."
- According to Srinivasachari.C. S, The Mallikesvarar Temple was constructed by Alanganatha Pillai, assistant chief merchant to the East India Company, in the 17th century CE. The temple is first mentioned in a document of 1652 as "Mally Carjuns Old Pagoda". It is also believed to be the Muthialpet Pagoda depicted in a Madras map of 1710.
- According to Muthiah.S, the Chennakesava Perumal Temple was constructed in 1646.
- According to the Times of India article, The twin temples of Chenna Kesava and Chenna Malleeswara Swami were originally built by Beri Thimappa, the dubash who brokered the deal between Francis Day and the local chieftain for the small strip of beach that was to become the city of Madras. The city's name "Chennai" is said to have been derived from these temples.

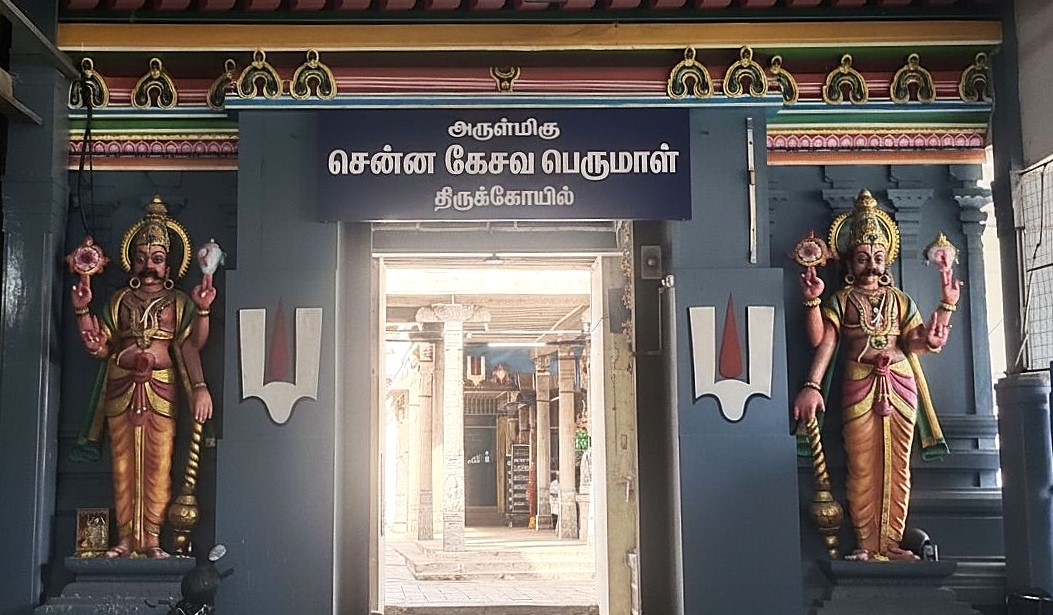
Chenna Kesava Perumal Temple Entrance

== See also ==
- History of Chennai in 1700s.
- Timeline of Chennai history
- Heritage structures in Chennai
