= Thimmappa =

Thimmappa is a name. People with the name include:

- Kagodu Thimmappa
- Beri Thimmappa
- Thimmappa Rudrappa Nesvi
