= Mallikesvarar Temple =

Shiva temple in Chennai district, Tamil Nadu, India

- மல்லிகேஸ்வரர் திருக்கோவில்
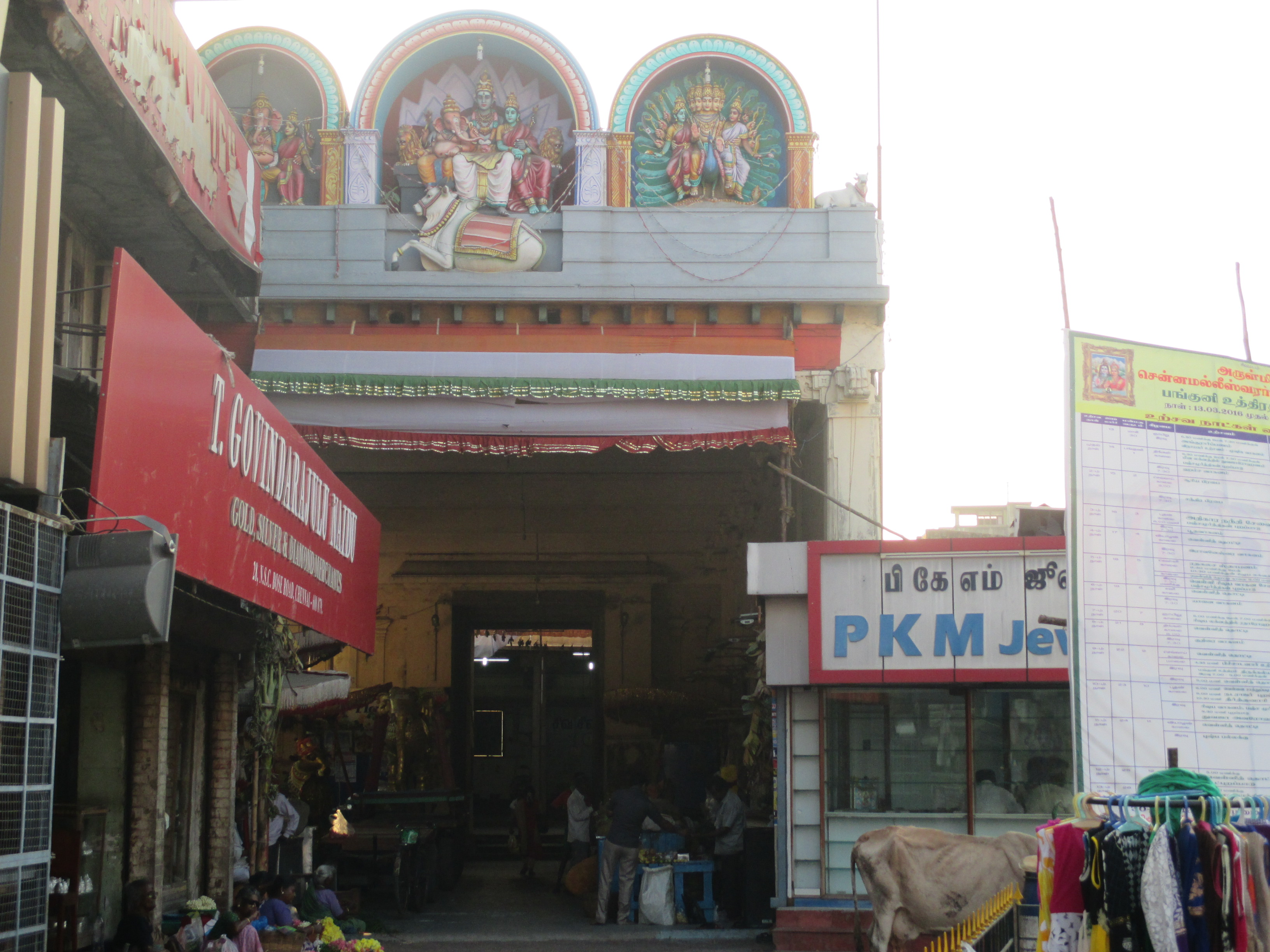
- Mallikesvarar Temple Temple

- Location within Tamil Nadu

Religion
- Affiliation: Hinduism
- District: Chennai
- Deity: Mallikesvarar Temple

Location
- Location: Chennai
- State: Tamil Nadu
- Country: India
- Coordinates: 13°5′2″N 80°16′12″E

Architecture
- Type: Dravidian architecture

Mallikesvarar Temple (Tamil: மல்லிகேஸ்வரர் திருக்கோவில்) or Mallikarjunar Temple (Tamil: மல்லிகார்ஜுனர் திருக்கோவில்) is a Hindu temple situated in the neighbourhood of George Town in the city of Chennai, India. It is one of the first Hindu temples to be constructed in the British settlement of Madrasapatnam. There is the nearby Chenna kesava perumal Temple. They are twin temples. This is also called Chenna Malleeswarar temple. Chenna pattanam may be named after this deities. The word 'chenni' in Tamil means face, and the temple was regarded as the face of the city.

== History ==
Sources about the history of this temple have the following:

- According to Srinivasan, T.A The Original twin temples' (Chenna kesava perumal and Chenna Malleeswarar) location was later occupied by the High court building. The original twin temples' history dates back to 1646 CE. Grants made to the original twin temples by Nagabattar and Thimmappar were recorded. Attack by other European powers and attack and looting of temples by Hyder Ali's forces caused the devotees to relocate some vigrahams to the Thiruneermalai Temple. The twin temples were demolished by the British, for the purpose of security and expansion of the nearby Fort St.George. Manali Muthu Krishna Mudaliar, translator for Lord Piccode, built new twin temples in 1700 CE in a different location (at Devaraja mudali Street, later called Sowcarpet). He donated his lands, used his own funds to build and he refused the money from the British, accepting only land from them.
- According to the official Chenna Kesava temple website: "The original Chenna kesava perumal Temple was located even in the 17th century AD in the place where the Madras High Court is currently located. When the original temple was present, there were a lot of problems in Chennai such as invasion by French and Tippu Sultan. The British East India Company demolished the original temple in 1757 AD. Due to public outcry, the East India Company donated land and some money to Manali Muthu krishna Mudaliar, who built the new Chenna Kesava Perumal temple in the year of 1762, at a different location i.e. at Devaraja Mudali Street in Sowcarpet area of Chennai city. Along with this Vishnu temple, he also built a temple for Shiva - Chenna Malleeswarar temple, thus Chennai got twin temples at Sowcarpet."
- According to Srinivasachari.C. S, The Mallikesvarar Temple was constructed by Alanganatha Pillai, assistant chief merchant to the East India Company, in the 17th century AD. The temple is first mentioned in a document of 1652 as "Mally Carjuns Old Pagoda". It is also believed to be the Muthialpet Pagoda depicted in a Madras map of 1710.
- According to Muthiah.S, The Chennakesava Perumal Temple was constructed in 1646.
- According to the Times of India article, The twin temples of Chenna Kesava and Chenna Malleeswara Swami were originally built by Beri Thimappah, the dubash who brokered the deal between Francis Day and the local chieftain for the small strip of beach that was to become the city of Madras. The city's regional name "Chennai" is said to have been derived from these temples.

== See also ==
- Heritage structures in Chennai
- History of Chennai in 1700s.
- Timeline of Chennai history
