= Timeline of Chennai =

This is a timeline of major events in the history of Chennai.

== Prehistory ==
- Around 250,000 BCE: An Old Stone Age settlement thrives on Pallavaram Hill.
- 1000 BCE: Megalithic settlement at Kundrathur.

== Before common era ==
- 300 BCE–300 CE: Sangam period in Tamil Nadu. Some Chennai neighbourhoods such as Mylapore appear to have been places of prominence during the Sangam period. Philosopher-saint Valluvar is often associated with Mylapore.
- 31 BCE: Politically estimated date of the birth of Valluvar.

== 1st millennium CE ==
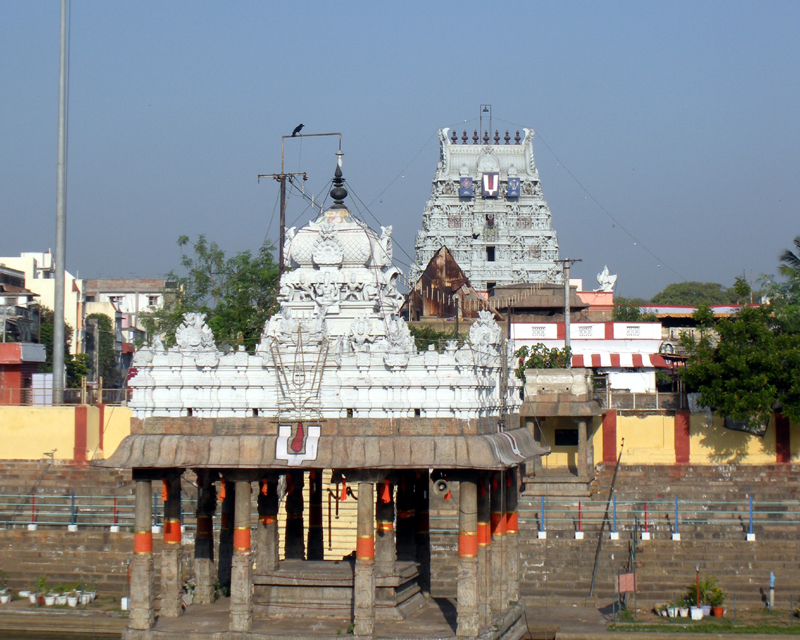
Parthasarathy Temple is one of the oldest structures in the city

- 52–70 CE: According to Christian tradition, one of the Christian apostles St. Thomas arrives in the vicinity of Chennai and preaches. He is allegedly killed on St. Thomas Mount.
- 6th century CE: Parthasarathy Temple is built.
- 7th century CE: Vedapureeswarar Temple, Descent of the Ganges (Mamallapuram), Kapaleeshwarar Temple, Tiruvottiyur Thyagaraja Temple, and Marundeeswarar Temple are built.
- 806 CE: Date of the oldest surviving inscription in the city, a mixed Tamil-Sanskrit record of the Pallava king Dantivarman found in the Parthasarathi Temple at Triplicane.
- 820 CE: Bhaktavatsala Perumal Temple is built.
- 957–970 CE: Dhenupureeswarar Temple is built.
- 900–1200 CE: Chennai forms a part of the Chola Empire. Neighbourhoods to the south of Egmore form part of the Chola province of Puliyur Kottam while those to the north form part of province of Puzhal Kottam.
- 10th century CE: Thiruporur Kandaswamy temple is built.

== 11th century ==
- Tirusoolanathar Temple, Tiruvalithayam Tiruvallesvarar Temple, and Velveeswarar Temple are built.

== 12th century ==
- Mylapore Karaneeswarar Temple, Kundrathur Murugan Temple, and Kurungaleeswarar Temple are built.

== 13th century ==
- 1241: Kundrathur Kandhalheeswarar Temple is built

== 16th century ==
- Early 16th century: Ekambareswarar–Valluvar Temple is built on an older structure.
- 1516: Church of Our Lady of Light is built.
- 1522: The Portuguese occupy Mylapore and set up a colony which they name São Tomé de Meliapore.
- 1523: Portuguese establish San Thome Church in honour of St. Thomas.

== 17th century ==
- 1612: Dutch arrive and capture the region and establish near Pulicat, just north of the city.
- 1626: The British East India Company decide to build a factory on the east coast and select Armagon (Dugarazpatnam), a village some 35 miles north of Pulicat, as its site.
- 1637: Francis Day, one of the officers of the East India Company, a member of the Masulipatam Council and the chief of the Armagon Factory, makes a voyage of exploration in 1637 down the coast as far as Pondicherry in order to choose a site for a new settlement.
- 1639: The English secures a grant from the Damarla Venkatadri Nayaka, Nayaks of Kalahasti, for getting a three-mile-long strip of land and the city of Madras is founded (22 August). Foundation is laid for Fort St. George.

- The population of the Portuguese and Dutch settlers in the region reaches 10,000, although substantially outnumbered by the local population.

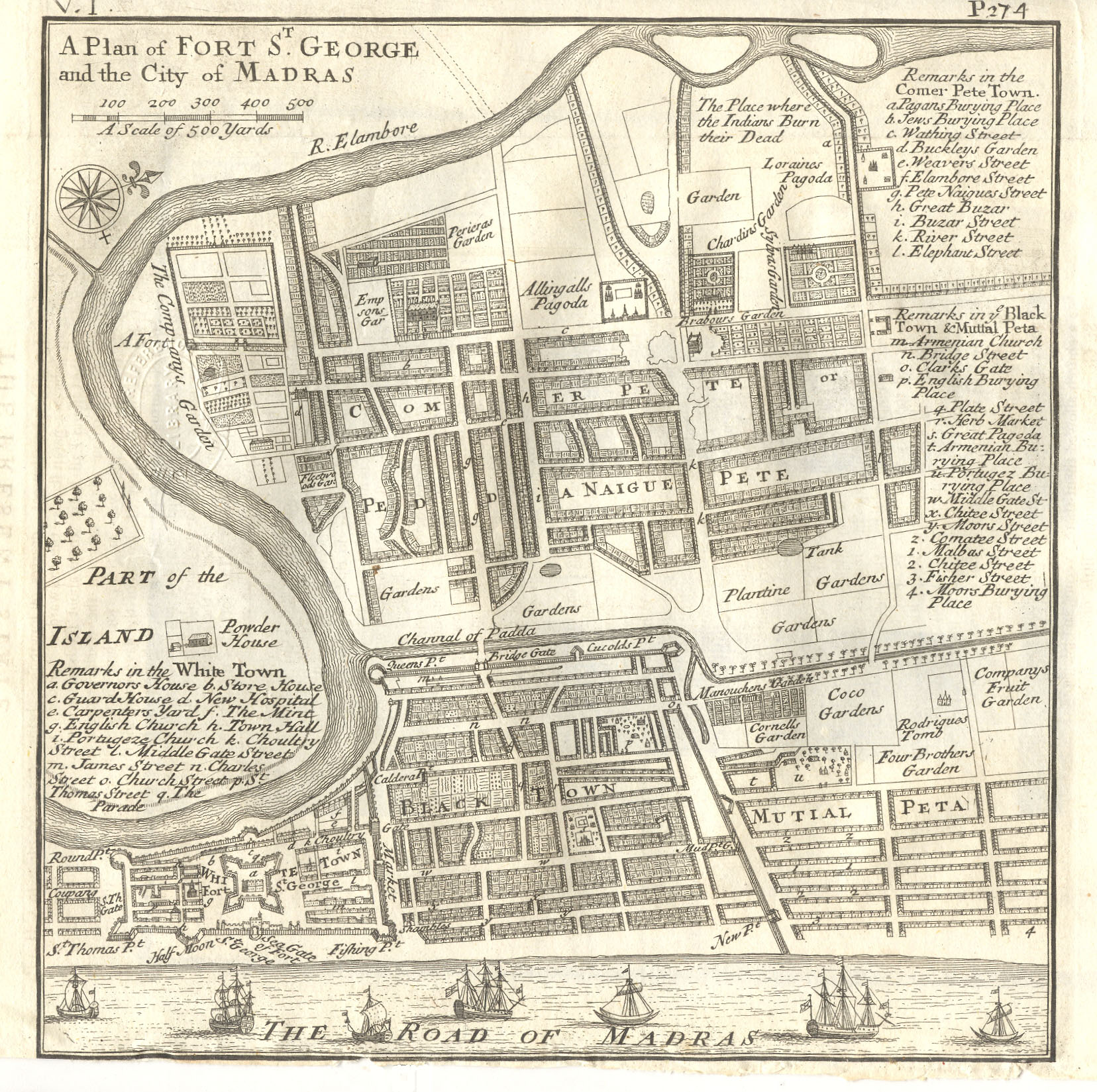
A plan of the Fort St. George and surrounding settlements

- 1640: Francis Day and Andrew Cogan land with 25 Europeans (20 February). Fort St. George is completed (23 April).

- Kalikambal Temple is moved to its present-day location.

- 1646: Population of the city recorded as 19,000.
- 1664: First British hospital in the country is started in Fort St. George (16 November); later becomes the Government General Hospital.
- 1668: Triplicane is annexed to the city.
- 1669: Population of the city increased to 40,000.
- 1678: Foundation is laid for St. Mary's Church in Fort St. George on Lady Day.
- 1680: St. Mary's Church is completed and consecrated on 28th October.
- 1683: First Commercial Bank, The Madras Bank, is founded.
- 1688: Madras City Municipal Corporation is inaugurated (29 September).
- 1693: Egmore, Purasawalkam and Tondiarpet are annexed to the city.

== 18th century ==
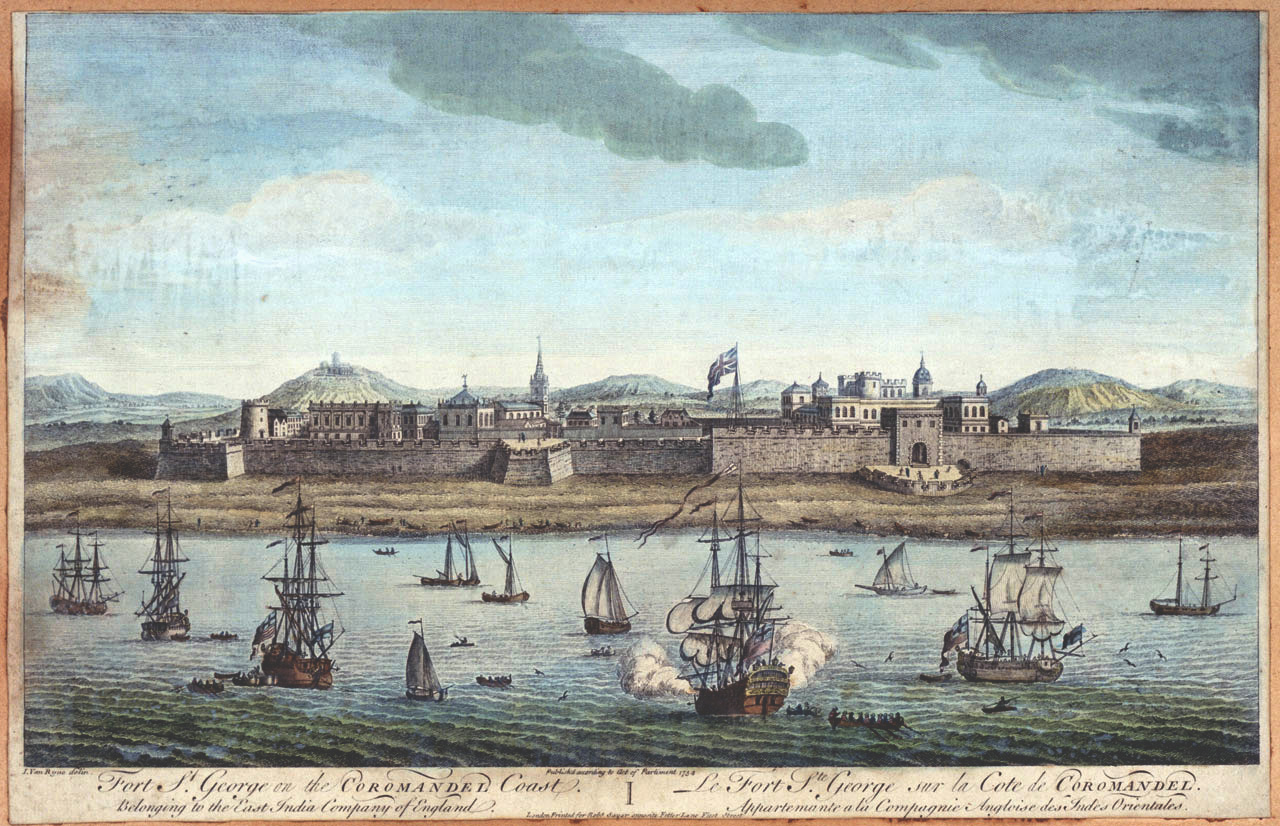
An 18th-century painting of Fort St George

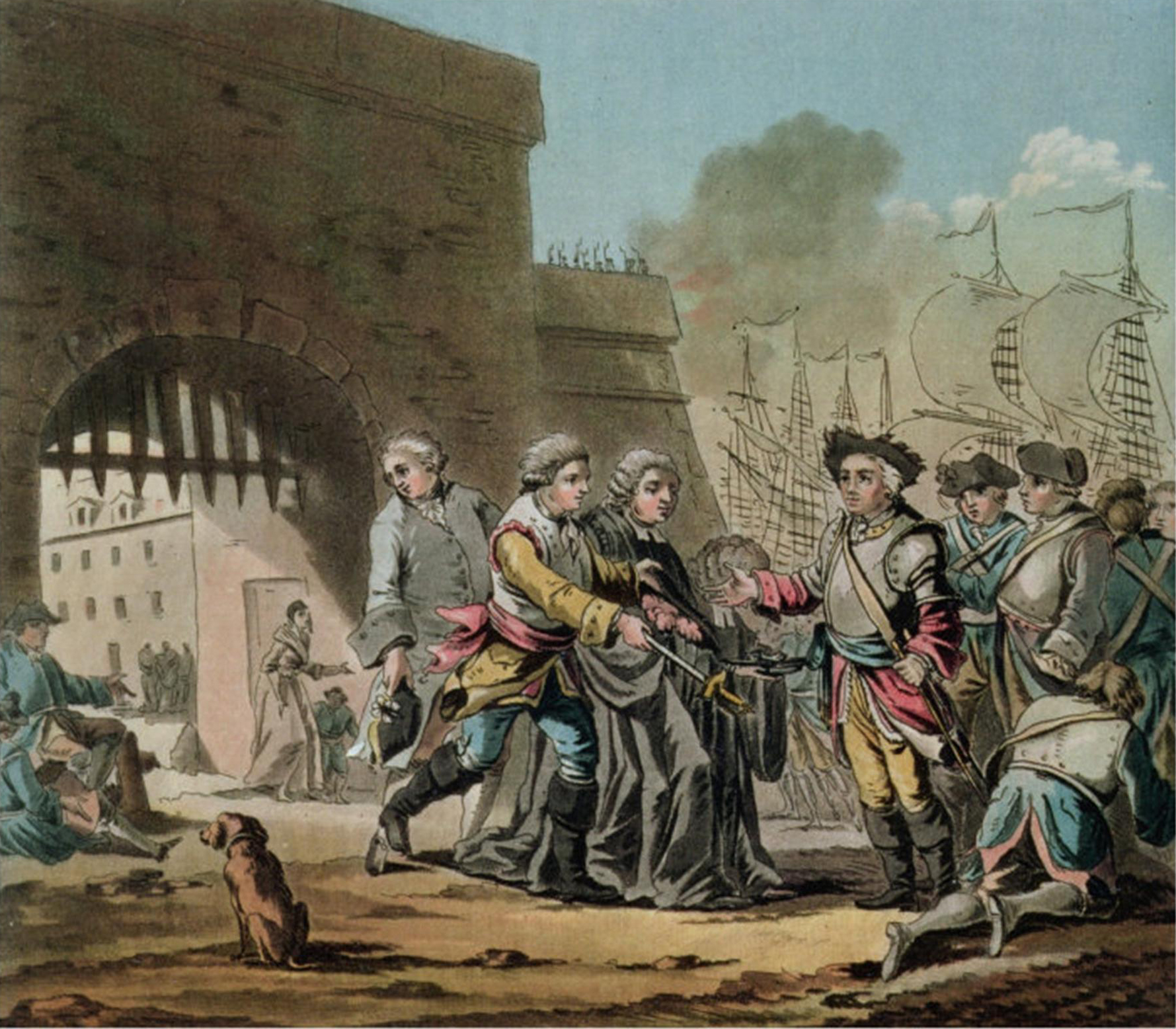
Surrender of the City of Madras in 1746 to de La Bourdonnais, by Jacques François Joseph Swebach

- 1701: Emperor Aurangazeb's general Daud Khan attacks Fort St. George. However, the British manage to hold the Fort.
- 1708: Five neighbouring villages of Thiruvottiyur, Nungambakkam, Vyasarpadi, kathivakkam and Sathangadu are annexed to the city.

- Wall is built around Black Town.

- 1711: First printing press is erected.
- 1751: East India Company acquires Tondiarpet.
- 1721: Cyclone strikes (13 and 14 November).
- 1726: Coja Petrus Uscan constructs the 134 stone steps at St. Thomas Mount, which are still used to reach the summit of the 300-feet hillock.
- 1735: Chintadripet is formed.
- 1742: Vepery, Periamet, Perambur and Pudupakkam are annexed to the city.
- 1744: Robert Clive, who later goes on to become the hero of the Carnatic, works as a writer at Fort St. George.
- 1746: The French Admiral La Bourdonnais capture Fort St George.
- 1749: The French return Madras to the English through the Treaty of Aix-la-Chapelle (1748).

- Santhome and Mylapore are annexed to the city.

- 1758: French Commander Lawly sieges Madras.
- 1759: French siege ends.
- 1760: New Black Town is developed over the debris of the old Black Town.
- 1767: Hyder Ali invades the city for the first time.
- 1768: Chepauk Palace is built by Nawab of Arcot.
- 1769: Hyder Ali invades the city for the second time.
- 1772: General Hospital at Fort St. George moves to its present location.

- Seven Wells Scheme, the city's first organised water supply, is started.

- 1777: Veerappillai is appointed as first Kotthawal, giving rise to the name 'Kotthawal Chavadi'.
- 1783: Fort St. George is repaired and attains the present shape.
- 1784: The first newspaper, Madras Courier, is founded.
- 1785: First post office starts functioning.
- 1786: William Petrie, a member of the Madras Government, builds a private astronomical observatory, the first observatory in the East.
- 1788: Thomas Parry (Chennai merchant) lands in Madras and begins the oldest surviving mercantile name in the city—Parry's.
- 1792: Systematic meteorological observations start, giving birth to the Madras Observatory and later the Regional Meteorological Centre.
- 1794: The Government Survey School, the oldest engineering school outside Europe and now part of the Anna University, commences at Fort St. George.

- American merchant William Abbott is appointed the first American consular agent of the Madras Presidency, marking the first consular presence in the city (24 November).

- 1795: Triplicane Wallajah Mosque is built.
- 1796: First lighthouse, functioning from the roof of the Officer's Mess (now housing the Fort Museum), is built.
- 1798: The area of the city was demarcated as the 69 km^{2} area surrounding the Fort and contained 16 hamlets within it.

== 19th century ==
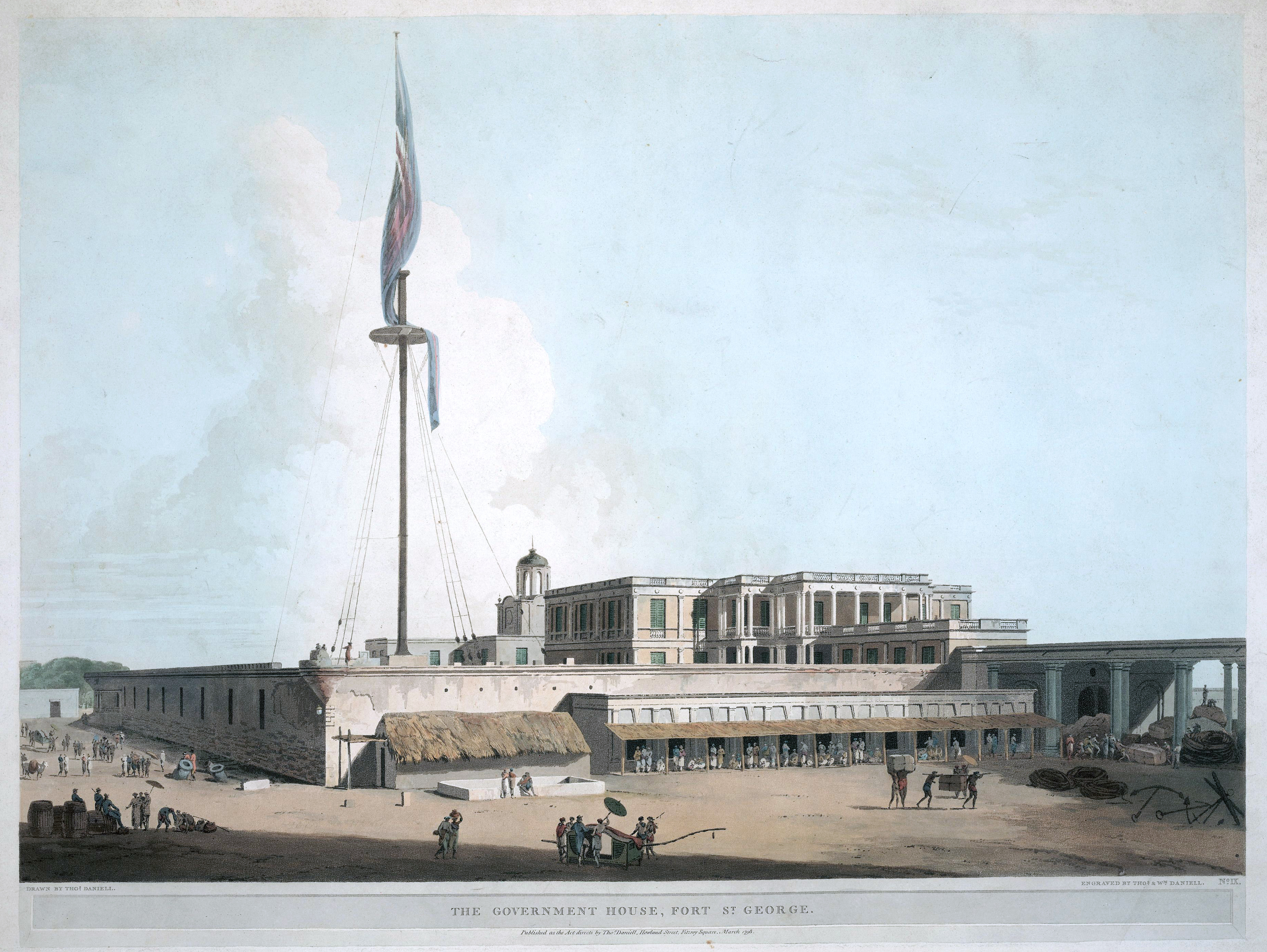
The government house at Fort St. George, 1804

- 1806: The first segment of the Buckingham canal, a saltwater navigation canal, is constructed.
- 1817: Madras Literary Society is founded.
- 1819: Madras Eye Infirmary, later the Egmore Eye Hospital, is established.
- 1826: Board of Public Instructions is founded.
- 1831: First census in the city is taken (population: 39,785).
- 1832: Madras Club is founded.
- 1834: First survey school is inaugurated; later develops as an engineering college.
- 1835: First medical college is founded (2 February); later becomes Madras Medical College.
- 1836: First goods train in the country was operated from Redhills to Chindadripet Bridge.
- 1840: Captain S. O. E. Ludlow begins hourly recording of meteorological observations.
- 1842: Ice House is built, where ice brought from America through ships is stored; later gets renamed as Vivekananda House.

- General Hospital, originally meant only for the English, opens its doors to Indians.

- 1844: First standalone lighthouse (second in the city) is built (1 January).

- Higginbotham's, the first book store in the country, is opened.

- 1846: Pachaiappan School is founded; later becomes Pachaiyappa's College.
- 1851: Museum is formed.
- 1854: Zoo is formed.

- Imperial Hotel is opened, which later becomes the Taj Connemara, the oldest functioning hotel in the city.

- 1855: University Board is formed.
- 1856: First Railway line from Royapuram to Arcot is built.
- 1857: University of Madras is founded.
- 1862: First pier is constructed at the harbour.
- 1864–65: Presidency College is built.
- 1868: Attempt begins to protected water supply.

- Further developments at the harbour begin.

- 1869: Napier Bridge was constructed by Francis Napier over the Cooum River.
- 1873: Birth registration begins.

- Madras Mail newspaper is founded.
- Cosmopolitan Club is founded.

- 1874: University Senate House is built.
- 1875: Madras observatory starts issuing daily weather reports.

- Edward VII lays the foundation for the new harbour in the city.

- 1876–78: Great Famine wipes the city.

- The 8-km-stretch of the Buckingham Canal linking the Adyar and Cooum rivers is dug.

- 1878: The Hindu newspaper is founded.
- 1882: First telephone is installed.
- 1885: Marina Beach promenade is built.
- 1886: Indian National Congress meets at Madras.
- 1889: High Court Building foundation is laid.
- 1892: High Court Building is inaugurated (July 12).
- 1893: San Thome Church is rebuilt in neo-Gothic style.
- 1894: First car is sold; A. J. Boag, director of Parry & Co, drives the car on city roads.
- 1895: First tram car service is inaugurated.
- 1896: Connemara Public Library is founded.
- 1899: First Tamil newspaper, Swadesamitran, is founded.

- King Institute, Guindy is founded (7 November).

== 20th century ==
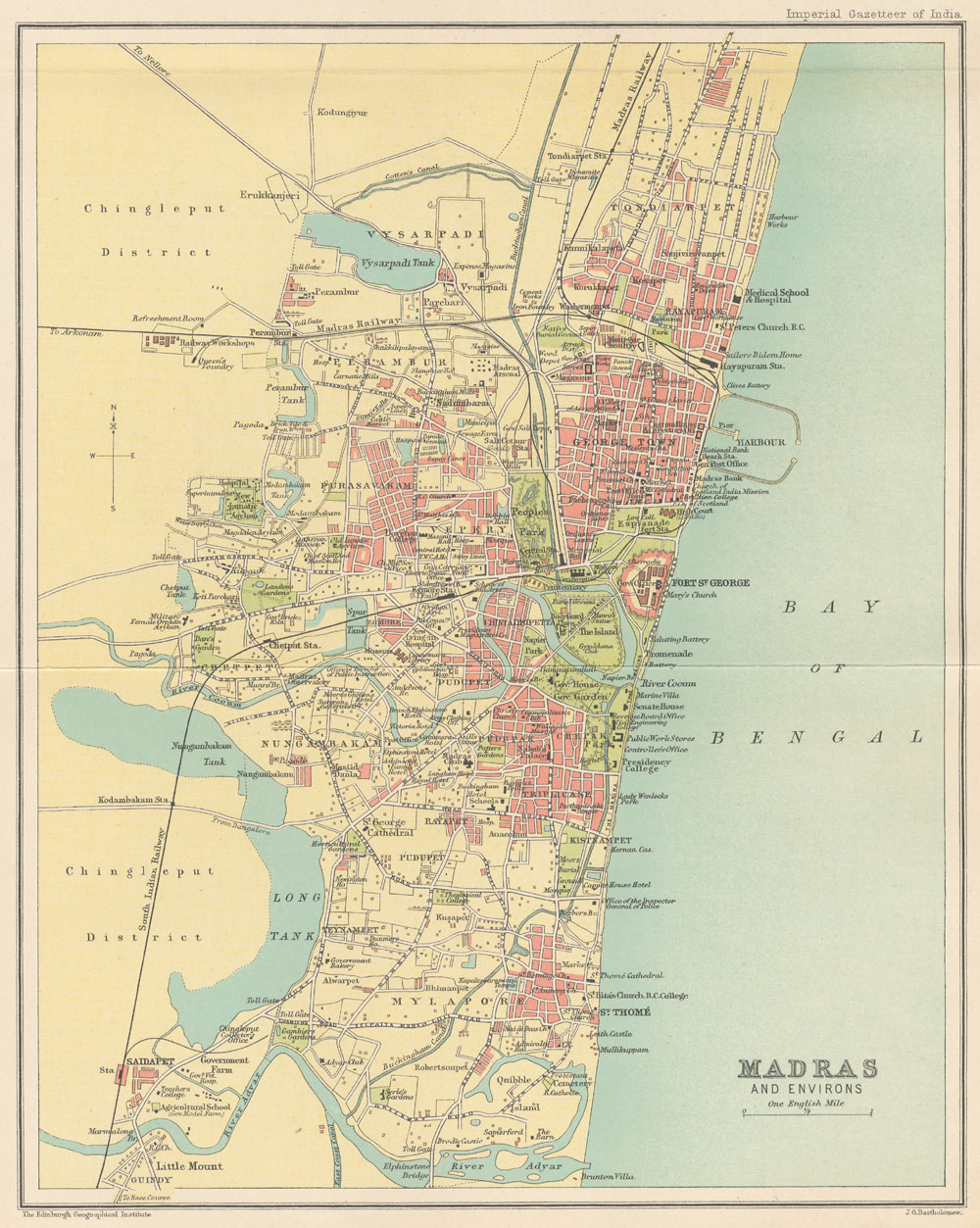
City of Madras in 1909

Map of Madras city in 1921

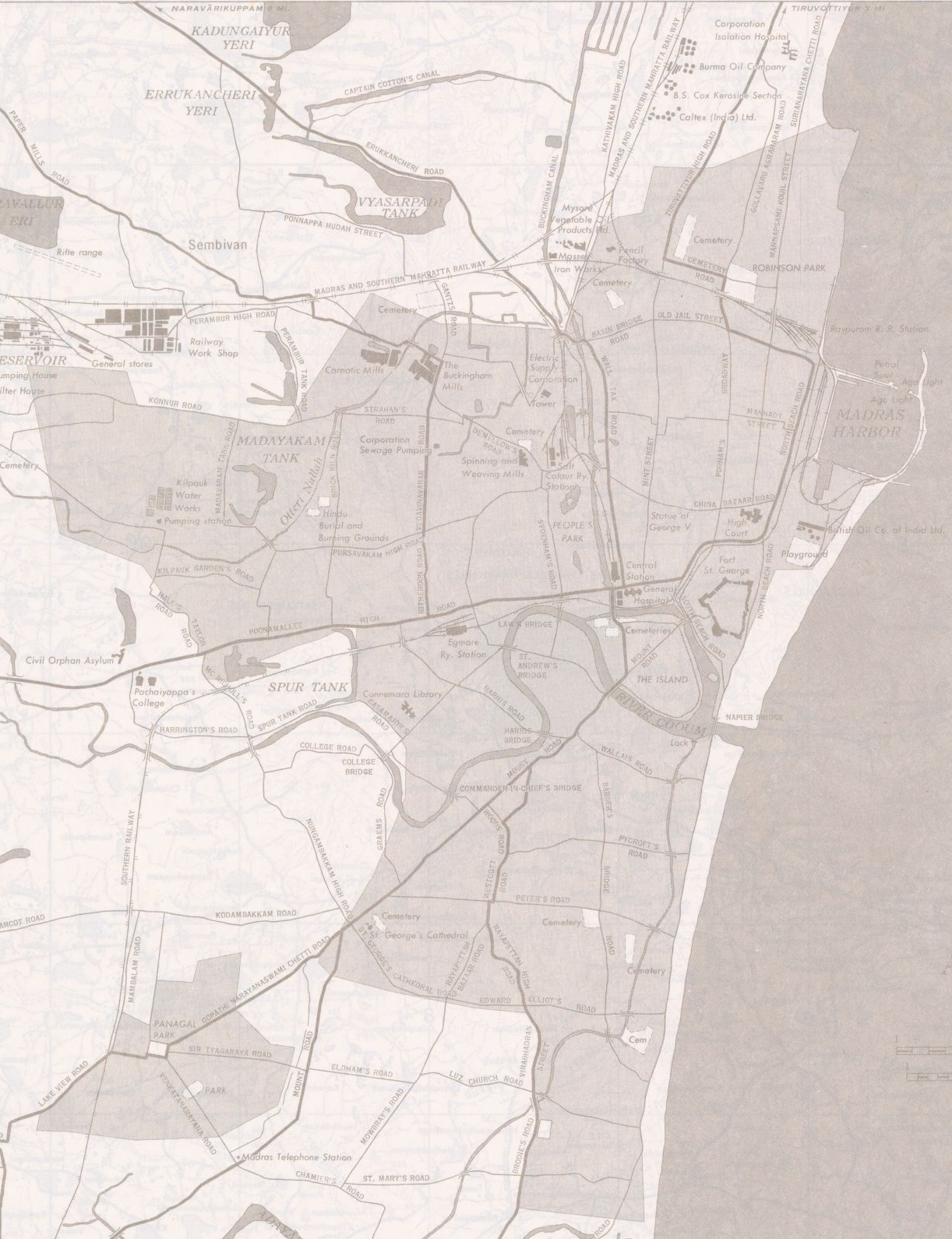
Map of Madras city in 1955

- 1901: The city, covering an area of about 70 km^{2}, has a population of 540,000.
- 1905: Chennai Port Trust is formed.
- 1906: Indian Bank is founded.
- 1910: Parsi fire temple is built at Royapuram.

- Giacomo D'Angelis tests the first ever flight in Asia, an indigenous aircraft, in the suburb of Pallavaram, arranged by Simpson & Co. (10 March).

- 1911: Government Royapettah Hospital is established.
- 1914: Water mains and drainage are formed.

- Street lights are introduced.
- Kilpauk water works is inaugurated.
- Bombardment of Madras—German fighter vessel Emden bombarded the sea shore and disappeared during the First World War.

- 1915: First commercial regular airmail service between Karachi and Madras by Tata Air Mail commences.
- 1923: The city is expanded to occupy an area of about 80 km^{2}.
- 1924: School of Indian Medicine is founded.

- Radio broadcasting begins (31 July).

- 1925: Loyola College is founded.

- First bus transport begins.

- 1928: Tambaram TB Sanatorium is established (9 April).
- 1930: First broadcasting station is founded at Ripon Buildings complex.
- 1931: Suburban electric train services start (from Chennai Beach to Tambaram).
- 1934: M. A. Muthiah Chettiar is appointed first mayor of the city.
- 1938: All India Radio is formed and broadcasting from Ripon Buildings ceases.

- Government Stanley Hospital is established.

- 1942: Second World War results in evacuation of Madras.
- 1943: Japanese fighter plane drops bombs on city and disappears.

- Population of the city crosses the million mark.

- 1945: Regional Meteorological Centre is established from the old Madras observatory.
- 1946: Mambalam, Saidapet, Government Farm, Puliyur, Kodambakkam, Saligramam, Adayar and Alandur villages, which formed part of Saidapet Municipality, are annexed to the city. Sembiyam, Siruvallur, Peravallur, Small Sembarambakkam and Ayanavaram, which formed part of Sembium Panchayat Board, are annexed to the city. Aminjikarai, Periyakudal, Maduvankarai villages, which formed part of Aminjikarai Panchayat Board, are annexed to the city. Part of Velacheri village, belonging to Velacheri Panchayat Board, is annexed to the city.
- 1947: Indian national flag is hoisted over Fort. St. George.

- Madras city chosen capital of Madras state

- 1950: Boundary of the city is extended to cover 129 km^{2} by the inclusion of Saidapet and Sembium
- 1952: Nehru Stadium is built.

- Integral Coach Factory starts functioning.
- Adyar Cancer Institute is founded.

- 1953: Government Dental College is founded (10 August).
- 1956: Gandhi Mandapam is built.
- 1956: Madras city is made the capital of Tamil Nadu state.
- 1957: Sri Lanka opens its consulate.
- 1959: Guindy Children's Park is inaugurated.

- LIC Building is built.

- 1960: Kilpauk Medical College starts functioning.
- 1961: Malaysia opens its consulate.
- 1965: Heavy Vehicles Factory is established at Avadi.
- 1966: Japan opens its consulate.

- Stedeford Hospital starts functioning (25 February).

- 1969: First World Tamil Congress is held.

- Madras State was renamed Tamil Nadu, meaning Tamil country.

- 1972: Snake Park is inaugurated.

- Madras Metropolitan Development Authority is formed.

- 1973: Madras Corporation is superseded.
- 1974: Rajaji Mandapam is built.

- Madras Television Centre is founded.
- Taj Coromandel hotel, the first luxury hotel in Chennai, is opened (14 April).

- 1975: Kamaraj Mandapam is built.
- 1976: Valluvar Kottam is built (April).
- 1977: New (present) lighthouse is built (10 January).

- Madras Metropolitan Water Supply and Sewage Board is formed.
- Kanagam, Taramani, Thiruvanmiyur, Velacheri, Kodambakkam, Virugambakkam, Saligramam, Koyambedu, Thirumangalam, Villivakkam, Errukancheri, Kolathur and Kodungaiyur panchayat areas are annexed to the city.

- 1978: Sankara Nethralaya hospital is founded (6 September).
- 1982: Hindu Mission Hospital, Chennai is founded (5 December).
- 1983: Zoo is shifted to Vandalur.

- Apollo Hospitals opens the country's first corporate hospital.

- 1985: Sri Ramachandra Medical Centre is established (11 September).
- 1987: Singapore opens its consulate (17 September).

- Madras Medical Mission hospital is established.

- 1988: Periyar Science Park is formed.

- Birla Planetarium is built.
- Madras Corporation's tercentenary is celebrated.
- Decentralisation of administration occurs.
- 10 circles are formed.

- 1990: Sundaram Medical Foundation is established.
- 1995: Australia opens its consulate.
- 1996: City of Madras is renamed as Chennai.
- 1998: Maximum permissible height of tall buildings is raised from 40 m to 60 m.
- 1999: MIOT Hospital is established.

== 21st century ==
- 2002: Intercity bus terminus at George Town gets shifted to Chennai Mofussil Bus Terminus (CMBT) at Koyambedu (18 November).
- 2004: Indian Ocean Tsunami wreaks havoc in the city, killing about 206 persons (26 December).
- 2005: Thailand opens its consulate.
- 2010: First seawater desalination plant starts functioning at Minjur (25 July).
- 2011: Nine municipalities, 8 town panchayats, and 25 village panchayats are annexed to the city. The city reaches the present stage of 426 km^{2} from 174 km^{2}.
- 2012: ITC Grand Chola, the largest hotel in South India, is inaugurated (15 September).
- 2013: Second seawater desalination plant starts functioning at Nemmeli (22 February).

- Belgium opens its consulate (28 November)

- 2014: South Korea opens its consulate (7 February)
- 2015: The Chennai Metro starts functioning (29 June).

- The 2015 South Indian floods cause the deaths of hundreds of people and damages worth several billions of dollars.

- 2020: The first COVID-19 case is detected (7 March)
- 2021: World Trade Center starts functioning (September)

== See also ==
- History of Chennai
