= Rudrappa =

Rudrappa is a name. People with the name include:

- Rudrappa Lamani
- Thimmappa Rudrappa Nesvi
