= Chintadri Pillaiyar Kovil =

Religion
- Affiliation: Hinduism
- District: Chennai
- Deity: Lord Ganesa

Location
- Location: Chennai
- State: Tamil Nadu
- Country: India

Architecture
- Completed: 1717

Chintadri Pillaiyar Kovil is a Hindu temple in Devaraja Mudali Street in Georgetown, Chennai. The temple is dedicated to Ganesa and was constructed in 1717. The temple is situated close to the Mallikesvarar Temple and was the site of a dispute between the Komati Chetti and Beri Chetti communities in the 18th century.
