= Kothawal Chavadi =

- Neighbourhood
- Map showing Kothawal Chavadi in Tamil Nadu
- Coordinates: 13°4′N 80°12′E
- Country: India
- State: Tamil Nadu
- Districts: Chennai
- Time zone: UTC+5:30 (Indian standard time)

Kothawal Chavadi is a neighbourhood in Chennai, India. It is situated in the northern part of the city adjoining George Town, Chennai. Until 1996, Kothawal Chavadi housed Asia's largest fruit and vegetable market. The market has since been moved to Koyambedu.
