= Beri Thimappa =

Beri Thimappa / Thimmanna was an Indian interpreter and chief negotiator for Francis Day and Andrew Cogan, the agents of the British East India Company, and was instrumental in the purchase of Madras from the Nayak brothers. Beri Thimmappa migrated in the early 17th century to Chennai from palakollu, near Machilipatnam in Andhra Pradesh.

His families were chief merchants of East India Company for several decades. Thimmappa's brother Beri Venkatadri owned Guindy Lodge, which is present Tamil Nadu Raj Bhavan.He is one of the founder of Madras state.In the early seventeenth century, the East India Company sought to establish a factory in Madras. Berry Timmapa, a resident of Palacole and influential with local princes, was enlisted to help. He secured permission from Damerla Venkatapa Naick and the ruling prince Sreeranga Rayalu, receiving a grant for three villages: Egmore, Tondavadoo, and Poodupauk. Venkatapa Naick insisted the new town be named Chennapatnam, in honor of his father, Chennapa Naick.

Berry Timmapa facilitated the construction of Chennapatnam on the northern side of the factory and invited settlers. He allocated lands for different castes and built two temples, Vishnu's Chenna Kesava Perumal and Shiva's Chenna Mallesvara. This took place around 1639, according to historical records.

Mr. Day, the Company's Agent, established the factory in a fishermen's village, overcoming initial resistance from the headman, Madarasen. Timmapa's influence led to the area being named Madarasenpatam, later commonly called Madraspatam.

Timmapa also secured a customs exemption for his family from the Sultan of Golconda. His prominence was recognized by the Company, with honors such as a salute of five guns and special gifts on Pongal days. Notably, a letter from Mr. Thomas Pitt in 1698 highlights the family's esteemed position.

Timmapa's descendants continued to play a significant role in Madras, enjoying privileges and holding important positions. They maintained the right of packing the Company's bales and were involved in the annual festivals of the town's temples. The family's legacy included building a tank and holding a copper plate grant for land, which benefited their descendants for generations.

In the 18th century, Timmapa's family remained prominent, contributing to the growth of Chintadripet. Members like Chinna Venkatadry, who succeeded his brother as chief merchant, were among the first Aldermen of Madras Corporation, gifting properties to the Company and maintaining their influential status in Madras society.
