= Periyakudal =

- city
- Location within Chennai Location within Tamil Nadu Location within India
- Coordinates: 13°05′N 80°13′E
- Country: India
- State: Tamil Nadu
- District: Chennai

Languages
  - Official: Tamil
- Time zone: UTC+5:30 (IST)
- Vehicle registration: TN-

Periyakudal is one of the neighborhoods of the city of Chennai in Tamil Nadu, India. It is located in the northern part of the city and forms a part of Egmore-Nungambakkam taluk.
