= List of renamed public places in Tamil Nadu =

Ever since the British left India in 1947, many streets, places and buildings throughout India were assigned new "Indian names". Tamil Nadu was no exception to this trend.

Even the state and its capital, Chennai along with many other cities, towns, streets and organisations were renamed post Indian Independence. Before the name changes, Madras (the city) used to be the capital of the much larger Madras (the state).

== Geography ==
=== State ===
- Madras Presidency was renamed Madras (State) after independence in 1947.
- Madras (State) was renamed Tamil Nadu in 1969.

=== Districts ===
- Chidambaranar district was renamed Thoothukudi district in 1997
- Dr. Ambedkar Vellore district was renamed Vellore district in 1997
- Thiruvannamalai Sambuvarayer district was renamed Thiruvannamalai district in 1997
- Nagai Quaid-e-Millat district was renamed Nagapattinam district in 1997
- Villupuram Ramasamy Padayatchiyar District was renamed Villupuram district in 1997
- Periyar District was renamed Erode district in 1977.

=== Cities ===
- Madras (City) was renamed Chennai in 1996.
- Trichinopoly was renamed Tiruchirapalli
- Tuticorin was renamed Thoothukudi

=== Towns and municipalities ===
- Tirupattur renamed as Tirupathur
- Tiruvannamalai from Trinomali/Trimomalee
- Tiruchengode from Trichengode
- Kanyakumari from Cape Comorin
- Tharangambadi from Tranquebar
- Thanjavur from Tanjore
- Mayiladuthurai from Mayavaram
- Udhagamandalam from Ootacamund
- Ramanathapuram from Ramnad
- Parangipettai from Porto novo
- Tirunelveli from Tinnevelly
- Sadurangapattinam from Sadras
- Thiruvallur – Trivellore
- Kollidam – Coleroon
- Magudanchavadi – McDonald's Choultry (Salem District)
- Kodiakkarai – Point Calimere
- Kalambur – Aliyabadh
- Negapatnam to Nagapattinam
- Wandiwash to Vandavasi
- Conjeevaram to Kanchipuram
- Salem

=== Neighbourhoods ===
- Egmore to Ezhumbur
- Triplicane to Thiruvallikeni
- Mylapore to Mayilapoor
- Purasawalkam to Purasaivakkam
- Aminjikarai to Amainthakarai
- Poonamallee to Poovirunthavalli
- Kilpauk to Keezhpaakkam
- Kellys to Killiyoor
- Perambur to Peramboor
- Ayanavaram to Ayanpuram

=== Bridges ===
- Gemini Flyover in Chennai to Anna Flyover after C. N. Annadurai
- Pamban Road Bridge in Rameswaram to Annai Indira Gandhi Road Bridge after Indira Gandhi
- Porur Flyover in Chennai to Bharat Ratna Puratchi Thalaivar Dr. M.G.R. Flyover after M. G. Ramachandran
- Two-tier Flyover in Salem to Puratchi Thalaivi J. Jayalalithaa Two-tier Flyover after J. Jayalalithaa

=== Roads ===
- Brough Road in Erode to Meenakshi Sundaranar Salai after Meenakshi Sundaranar
- Chamiers Road in Chennai to Pasumpon Muthuramalinga Thevar Salai after U. Muthuramalingam Thevar
- Commander-In-Chief Road in Chennai to Ethiraj Salai after V. L. Ethiraj
- East Coast Road in Chennai to Muthamizh Arignar Kalaignar Karunanidhi Salai after M. Karunanidhi
- Edward Elliot Road in Chennai to Dr. Radhakrishnan Salai after Sarvepalli Radhakrishnan
- Elliot's Beach Road in Chennai to Sardar Patel Salai after Sardar Vallabhbhai Patel
- Frazer Bridge Road in Chennai to TNPSC Salai after TNPSC
- Gandhi Nagar 4th Main Road in Chennai to B. Ramachandra Adithanar Salai after B. Ramachandra Adityan
- Gokula Kannan Road in Tirunelveli to Dr. M.G.R. Salai after M. G. Ramachandran
- Griffith Road in Chennai to Maharajapuram Santhanam Salai after Maharajapuram Santhanam
- Halls Road in Chennai to Tamil Salai after Tamil language
- Harris Road in Chennai to Adithanar Salai after S. P. Adithanar
- Inner Ring Road in Chennai to Jawaharlal Nehru Salai after Jawaharlal Nehru
- Lattice Bridge Road in Chennai to Dr. Muthulakshmi Salai after Dr. Muthulakshmi Reddi
- Lloyds Road in Chennai to Avvai Shanmugam Salai after T. K. Shanmugam
- Marina Beach Road in Chennai to Kamarajar Salai after K. Kamaraj
- Marshall's Road in Chennai to Rukmini Lakshmipathi Salai after Rukmini Lakshmipathi
- Montieth Road in Chennai to Red Cross Road after Red Cross Movement
- Mount Road in Chennai to Anna Salai after C. N. Annadurai
- Mowbray's Road in Chennai to T.T.K. Salai after T. T. Krishnamachari
- North Beach Road in Chennai to Rajaji Salai after C. Rajagopalachari
- Nungambakkam Highway in Chennai to Mahatma Gandhi Salai after Mahatma Gandhi
- Old Mamallapuram Road in Chennai to Rajiv Gandhi Salai after Rajiv Gandhi
- Oliver Road in Chennai to Musiri Subramaniam Salai after Musiri Subramania Iyer
- Omalur Main Road in Salem to M.G.R. Salai after M. G. Ramachandran
- Padmavathi Nagar Main Road in Chennai to Chinna Kalaivanar Vivek Salai after Vivek
- Palayamkottai Road in Thoothukudi to Tamizh Salai after Tamil language
- Perumbakkam Main Road in Chennai to Semmozhi Salai after Classical language
- Ponamallee Highway in Chennai to Periyar E.V.R. Salai after E. V. Ramasami
- Port Highway in Thoothukudi to V.O.C. Salai after V. O. Chidambaram Pillai
- Pycrofts Road in Chennai to Bharathi Salai after Subramania Bharati
- Royapettah Highway in Chennai to Thiru. Vi.Ka. Salai after Thiru. V. Kalyanasundaram
- Sampath Nagar Road in Erode to Tyagi Kumaran Salai, Sampath Nagar after Tirupur Kumaran
- Sholinganallur Main Road in Chennai to Kalaignar Karunanidhi Salai after M. Karunanidhi
- Simmakkal Road in Madurai to V.O. Chidambaranar Salai after V. O. Chidambaram Pillai
- South Boag Road in Chennai to Chevalier Sivaji Ganesan Salai after Sivaji Ganesan
- Warren Road in Chennai to Bhakthavatsalam Salai after M. Bhakthavatsalam
- West Great Cotton Road (W.G.C. Road) in Thoothukudi to V.O. Chidambaranar Salai (V.O.C. Salai) after V. O. Chidambaram Pillai
- Wall Tax Road in Chennai to V.O.C. Salai after V. O. Chidambaram Pillai
- Whannels Road in Chennai to Annai E.V.R. Maniammaiyar Salai after E. V. R. Maniammai

== Seaport ==
- Ennore Port to Kamarajar Port Limited
- Thoothukkudi Port Trust to V.O. Chidambaranar Port Authority

== Airport ==
- Terminal 1 in Chennai International Airport to Kamaraj Domestic Terminal - T1
- Terminal 2 in Chennai International Airport to Anna International Terminal - T2
- Terminal 4 in Chennai International Airport to M.G.R. Domestic Terminal - T4
- Tuticorin Airport to Bharat Ratna Perunthalaivar K.Kamarajar Airport

== Railway Station ==
- Chennai Central Railway Station to Puratchi Thalaivar Dr. M.G. Ramachandran Central Railway Station
- Maniyachchi Junction Railway Station to Vanchi Maniyachchi Junction Railway Station
- Maraimalai Nagar Railway Station to Maraimalai Nagar Kamarajar Railway Station
- Vyasarpadi Railway Station to Vyasarpadi Jeeva Railway Station

== Metro Station ==
- Alandur Metro to Arignar Anna Alandur Metro
- Chennai Central Metro to Puratchi Thalaivar Dr. M.G. Ramachandran Central Metro
- Chennai Mofussil Bus Terminus Metro to Puratchi Thalaivi Dr. J. Jayalalithaa CMBT Metro

== Bus Terminus ==
- Alangulam Bus Stand to Perunthalaivar Kamarajar Memorial Bus Stand
- Anjugramam Bus Stand to Dr. M.G.R. Bus Stand
- Attur Bus Stand to Perunthalaivar Kamarajar Bus Stand
- Chengalpattu Bus Stand to Perarignar Anna Bus Stand
- Chennai Mofussil Bus Terminus to Puratchi Thalaivar Dr. M.G.R. Bus Terminus
- Chinnasalem Bus Stand to Perunthalaivar Kamaraj Bus Stand
- Dharmapuri Bus Stand to P.R. Rajagopal Gounder Bus Stand
- Dindigul Bus Stand to Kamarajar Bus Stand
- Erode Central Bus Stand to Independence day Silver Jubilee Bus Terminus
- Ettayapuram Bus Stand to Mahakavi Bharathiyar Bus Stand
- Hosur Bus Stand to K. Appavu Pillai Bus Stand
- Kallakurichi Bus Stand to Perarignar Dr. Anna Bus Stand
- Kancheepuram Bus Stand to Perarignar Anna Bus Stand
- Kanniyakumari Bus Stand to Kavimani Desigavinayagam Bus Stand
- Kovilpatti Old Bus Stand to Arignar Anna Bus Stand
- Kilambakkam Bus Terminus to Kalaignar Centenary Bus Terminus
- Krishnagiri Bus Stand to Perarignar Anna Bus Stand
- Mattuthavani Integrated Bus Terminus to M.G.R. Bus Stand
- Madurai Central Bus Stand to Periyar Bus Stand
- Mayiladuthurai Bus Stand to Perunthalaivar Kamarajar Bus Stand
- Rajapalayam Bus Stand to Gandhiji Centenary Memorial Bus Stand
- Salem Central Bus Stand to Bharat Ratna Dr. M.G.R. Central Bus Stand
- Sathankulam Bus Stand to Bharat Ratna Perunthalaivar K.Kamarajar Bus Stand
- Sattur Bus Stand to Anna Coral Jubilee Bus Stand
- Sivakasi Bus Stand to N.R.K. Rajarathnam Bus Stand
- Thanjavur Old Bus Stand to Ayyasamy Vandayar Memorial Bus Stand
- Theni Bus Stand to Colonel John Penny Cuick Bus Stand
- Thisayanvilai Bus Stand to Perunthalaivar Kamarajar Bus Stand
- Thoothukkudi Central Bus Stand to Perarignar Anna Bus Terminus
- Tiruchendur Bus Stand to Thyagi Bhagat Singh Bus Stand
- Tirunelveli New Bus Stand to Bharat Ratna Dr. M.G.R. Bus Stand
- Tirunelveli Junction Bus Stand to Tirunelveli Junction Periyar Bus Stand
- Usilampatti Bus Stand to Pasumpon U. Muthuramalinga Thevar Memorial Bus Stand
- Vadipatti bus stand to Anna memorial bus stand
- Vilathikulam Bus Stand to Bharathiyar Bus Stand
- Virudhunagar New Bus Stand to Karmaveerar Kamarajar Bus Stand
- Virudhunagar Old Bus Stand to M.S.P. Nadar Bus Stand

== Transport ==
The Tamil Nadu state owned transport corporations operated buses to facilitate public transport in the state and interstate connectivity through roads. It named various corporations by prominent personalities/kings of regional/national importance. However the practice was scrapped and it started naming the corporations as TNSTC – Regional Division (Ex TNSTC Villupuram Division) after communal violence broke in the district of Virudhunagar during May 1997 after formation of Veeran Sundaralingam Transport corporation in which buses bearing the name Veeran Sundaralingam were burnt by some groups.

- Pallavan Transport Corporation (PTC) & Dr. Ambedkar Transport Corporation (DATC) to Metropolitan Transport Corporation (MTC) (TN-01/02)
- Thiruvalluvar Transport Corporation (TTC) & Rajiv Gandhi Transport Corporation (RGTC) to State Express Transport Corporation (SETC) (TN-01/07)
- Thanthai Periyar Transport Corporation (TPTC) to TNSTC Villupuram DIV I (TN-32)
- Pattukottai Azhagiri Transport Corporation (PATC) to TNSTC Villupuram DIV II (Vellore) (TN-23)
- Puratchi Thalaivar M.G.R. Transport Corporation (PTMGRTC) to TNSTC Villupuram DIV III (Kanchipuram) (TN-21)
- Chozhan Transport Corporation to TNSTC Kumbakonam DIV I (TN-49 then TN-68)
- Deeran Chinnamalai Transport Corporation (DCTC) to TNSTC Kumbakonam DIV II (Trichy) (TN-45)
- Marudu Pandiyar Transport Corporation to TNSTC Kumbakonam DIV III (Karaikudi) (TN-63)
- Veeran Azhagu Muthukon Transport Corporation to TNSTC Kumbakonam DIV IV (Pudukkotai) (TN-55)
- Anna Transport Corporation to TNSTC Salem DIV I (TN-27)
- Annai Sathya Transport Corporation to TNSTC Salem DIV II (Dharmapuri) (TN-29)
- Cheran Transport Corporation to TNSTC Coimbatore DIV I(TN-37 then TN-38)
- Jeeva Transport Corporation to TNSTC Coimbatore DIV II (Erode) (TN-33)
- Bharathiyar Transport Corporation to TNSTC Coimbatore DIV III Ooty then merged to TNSTC Coimbatore DIV I(TN-43)
- Pandiyan Transport Corporation to TNSTC Madurai DIV I (TN-59 then TN-58)
- Kattabomman Transport Corporation to TNSTC Tirunelveli DIV I (Tirunelveli) (TN-72)
- Nesamany Transport Corporation to TNSTC Tirunelveli DIV II (Nagercoil) (TN-74)
- Rani Mangamma Transport Corporation to TNSTC Madurai DIV IV (Dindigul) (TN-57)
- Veeran Sundaralingam Transport Corporation to TNSTC Madurai DIV V (Virudhunagar) (TN-67)

== Infrastructure ==
- Chepauk Stadium or MCC (Madras Cricket Club) ground to M.A. Chidambaram Stadium
- Srinivasa Mudaliar Park to VOC Park, Erode.
