= Thimmappa Rudrappa Nesvi =

Indian politician

Member of Parliament
- In office 1952–1962
- Preceded by: Constituency established
- Succeeded by: F. H. Mohsin
- Constituency: Dharwad South

Personal details
- Born: 1900 (age 125–126) Deevizihalli, Hirekerur Taluka, Dharwar district, Bombay Presidency, British India
- Party: Indian National Congress
- Education: B.A. (1929)
- Alma mater: Bombay University
- Profession: Freedom fighter, peasant leader, politician

Thimmappa Rudrappa Nesvi (also spelt Neswi or Timmappa Rudrappa Nesvi) (born 1900) was an Indian freedom fighter, peasant leader, and prominent politician from the state of Karnataka. He served as a Member of Parliament (MP) in the 1st Lok Sabha and 2nd Lok Sabha representing the Dharwar South constituency from 1952 to 1962. Known for his grassroots activism, Nesvi was a key architect of anti-tax agitations and peasant movements in colonial India and later played a significant role in the Reorganisation of States that led to the unified state of Karnataka.

== Personal life ==
He was an eminent Indian freedom fighter, peasant activist, and politician of the Indian National Congress who served as a Member of Parliament (MP) in the Lok Sabha from 1952 to 1962, representing the Dharwar South constituency. Born in 1900 in the village of Deevizihalli within the Dharwar District of the colonial Bombay Presidency, British India, he came from an agrarian background but pursued higher education, graduating with a Bachelor of Arts (B.A.) degree from Bombay University in 1929. Professionally dedicated to grassroots activism and governance, Nesvi entered institutional politics prior to independence, notably serving as a Parliamentary Secretary to the Government of Bombay in 1937 and later as a Member of the Bombay Legislative Assembly from 1947 to 1951.

== Early life and education ==
Thimmappa Rudrappa Nesvi was born in 1900 in the village of Deevizihalli, situated in the Hirekerur (then Kod) Taluka of the undivided Dharwar district, which was then a part of the southern region of the Bombay Presidency. Despite coming from an agrarian rural background, Nesvi pursued higher education. He moved to Bombay for his studies and graduated with a Bachelor of Arts (B.A.) degree from Bombay University in 1929. His time at the university coincided with the peak of the Indian national movement, which deeply influenced his political philosophy and pulled him toward the freedom struggle led by Mahatma Gandhi.

== Role in the freedom struggle ==
Upon graduating in 1929, Nesvi immediately threw himself into grassroots political dissent against the British Raj.

- The No-Tax Campaign (1929): In the very year of his graduation, Nesvi successfully organised and conducted a widespread "No-Tax Campaign" (tax resistance movement) among agrarian communities in his native Taluka of Kod. This act of civil defiance drew heavy colonial surveillance, resulting in his initial arrest and designation as a political detainee.
- Underground Activities: Following his initial release from prison, Nesvi eluded local police forces by operating from a series of secret hideouts. From this underground network, he successfully managed and guided the Civil Disobedience Movement across the strategic towns of Sirsi and Siddapur.
- Rigorous Imprisonment: His evasion ended when colonial authorities intercepted him. He was sentenced to two years of rigorous imprisonment alongside a steep financial penalty of ₹200.

== Pre-independence legislative career ==
Following the implementation of provincial autonomy under the Government of India Act 1935, Nesvi transitioned into institutional politics.

1. Parliamentary Secretary (1937): In 1937, during the formation of the first Congress ministries, Nesvi was appointed as the Parliamentary Secretary to the Government of Bombay. He served under the premier presidency leadership until the Congress ministries resigned en masse at the outbreak of World War II.
2. Bombay Legislative Assembly (1947–1951): As India transitioned into independence, Nesvi was elected as a Member of the Bombay Legislative Assembly, serving a full term from 1947 to 1951. During this crucial legislative phase, he vehemently advocated for the integration of Kannada-speaking regions spread across the Bombay Presidency.

== Post-independence career and Lok Sabha (1952–1962) ==
Nesvi holds a permanent place in India's legislative history as a member of the country's foundational parliaments.

First Lok Sabha (1952–1957): In India's first-ever general elections held in 1952, Nesvi contested on an Indian National Congress ticket from the Dharwar South constituency. He secured a victory and was sworn into the historic 1st Lok Sabha.

Second Lok Sabha (1957–1962): He successfully defended his seat in the 1957 general elections. He maintained his legislative focus on agricultural reforms, railway connectivity in North Karnataka, and educational infrastructure for rural communities until the dissolution of the house in 1962.

=== Reorganisation of states & Karnataka movement ===
Nesvi was a passionate advocate for the unified state of Karnataka. He worked closely with top leaders like S. Nijalingappa and Jawaharlal Nehru to deliberate on borders, state reorganisation, and regional representation. His extensive correspondence during this phase is preserved within national archives, detailing the complex political negotiations that preceded the States Reorganisation Act of 1956.

== Agrarian reforms and organizational roles ==
Throughout his public life, Nesvi remained an organiser for small-scale farmers (ryots) and rural peasants.

- Peasant Leadership: He organised extensive Peasant Classes and chaired multiple Ryot Conferences across the Dharwar region to educate illiterate farmers about land tenancy rights, credit options, and institutional exploitation.
- Party Leadership: Recognising his organisational pull, the party appointed him as the Vice President of the Karnataka Pradesh Congress Committee (KPCC) in 1947. He also served simultaneously as the Vice President of both the Taluka and District Congress Committees, alongside a long-standing membership on the District Local Board of Dharwar.
