= Armagaon =

British East India Company colony

Armagaon or Armagon was the second colony of the English East India Company in Southern India. Its original name was Durgarazpatnam (Dugarazpatam) or Duraspatam.

It was chiefly inhabited by salt manufacturers. A small port 36 miles North of Pulicat it was the first place occupied by the British who erected a factory here in February 1626. It was hastily abandoned in 1641 in favour of Fort St. George. East India Company pioneer Streynsham Master (1640–1724) described the factory house as having "walls two Storeys high of one part of it, and a round Bulwart built single by itself".

== History ==
In the time of Gurava Naidu, the great great grandfather of Raja Gopal Naidu, some Englishmen came to the port and sent for the chief men of the place, Gurava Naidu, and said they wished to build a fort there. They landed a cannon and fired a shot in a westerly direction and asked for as much as land the shot had traversed. The land belonged to Venkatagiri Raja, who was induced by Gurava Naidu to allow the strangers to occupy the spot called Chenva Kuppam. Accordingly, they built a fort there.
