= Andrew Cogan =

English East India Company agent (c.1600-c,1660)

Sir Andrew Cogan, 1st Baronet also known as Andrew Coggan (born circa 1600, Greenwich, England; died circa 1660) was the first agent of the English East India Company to rule Madras (a. k. a. Chennai). He was the chief of the Masulipatnam factory when Madras was purchased from Peda Venkata Raya, the last king of the Aravidu dynasty of the Vijayanagara Empire, the capital of which was at Chandragiri. As such Cogan is a significant figure in the history of the English colonial empire.

== Purchase of Madras ==
In 1637, Francis Day, a member of the Masulipatnam Council and Chief of the Armagon Factory, made a voyage of exploration down the Coromandel Coast as far as Pondicherry. At that time, the Coromandel Coast was ruled by the Raja of Chandragiri through a local chief or Nayak, Damarla Venkatapathy Nayak, who ruled the coast from Pulicat up to San Thome. He had his seat at Wandiwash and his brother, Ayyappa Nayak resided at Poonamallee.

It is widely presumed that Ayyappa Nayak was the one who made overtures to the English to choose the area comprising the modern-day George Town for settlement. The offer looked good, and Day consulted Cogan, his superior, who investigated the proposed site and examined trading possibilities there. The results were favourable and Day secured a grant offering the village of Madraspatnam to the English for a period of two years. The grant was dated August 1639, and after obtaining the approval of the Factory at Masulipatnam and the Presidency of Bantam (in Java), the settlement of Madraspatnam was begun.

== Construction of Fort St. George ==
Day and Cogan were jointly responsible for the construction of Fort St. George. The building of the Factory House was taken up on 1 March 1640. A portion of the structure was presumably completed by St. George's Day (23 April) of that year and consequently the name "Fort St. George" was given to the fort.

The bastions were the first fortifications constructed; erection of the curtain walls connecting them proceeded more slowly, as it constructed in stages as funds permitted. The whole Fort took fourteen years to construct and was finished only in 1653.

== Cogan's agency ==
Soon after the construction of Fort St. George had begun, Day was charged with the offence of trading privately, outside of his parent company, and he left for England in 1641. During his absence, Cogan was made the Agent of Madras and he remained in the post for more than three years. During his time in power he strengthened the fortifications and strove to make the town prosperous. But, he was charged with extravagant expenditure on the fortifications; as a consequence of which he resigned his post and sailed to England in disgust. Day assumed the Agency of Madras and served as agent for a short time thereafter.

== Personal life ==
After returning to England, Cogan was an active supporter of the Royalist cause during the English Civil War (1642–1651). Following the Royalists' defeat (1653), he went into exile and his estates were confiscated. However, in 1657, following the Stuart Restoration Cogan was made a baronet, of Greenwich in the Baronetage of Ireland. He died in or about 1660, at which point his title became extinct.

== See also ==
- List of colonial governors and presidents of Madras Presidency

== Footnotes ==
New post	Agent of Madras; 1 March 1640 – 1643	Succeeded by Francis Day
Baronetage of Ireland
New creation	Baronet (of Greenwich); 1657–1660	Extinct
