= Francis Day (Madras) =

English colonial administrator

Francis Day (1605–1673) was an administrator associated with the East India Company. He served as a factor of the company's factory at Masulipatnam from 1632 to 1639. In 1639, he negotiated the purchase of a strip of land south of the Dutch factory at Pulicat from the Raja of Chandragiri, where the town of Madras was built. He served as the second Agent of Madras from 1643 to 1644. Along with Andrew Cogan, he is regarded as the founder of Madras.

== Early life ==
Francis Day was born to William Day of Bray and his wife Helen Wentworth, the daughter of a member of the House of Commons. He is believed to be the grandson of William Day, who was appointed Bishop of Winchester in 1595. Francis completed his education from Eton College and joined the services of the East India Company in 1632.

== Purchase of Madras ==
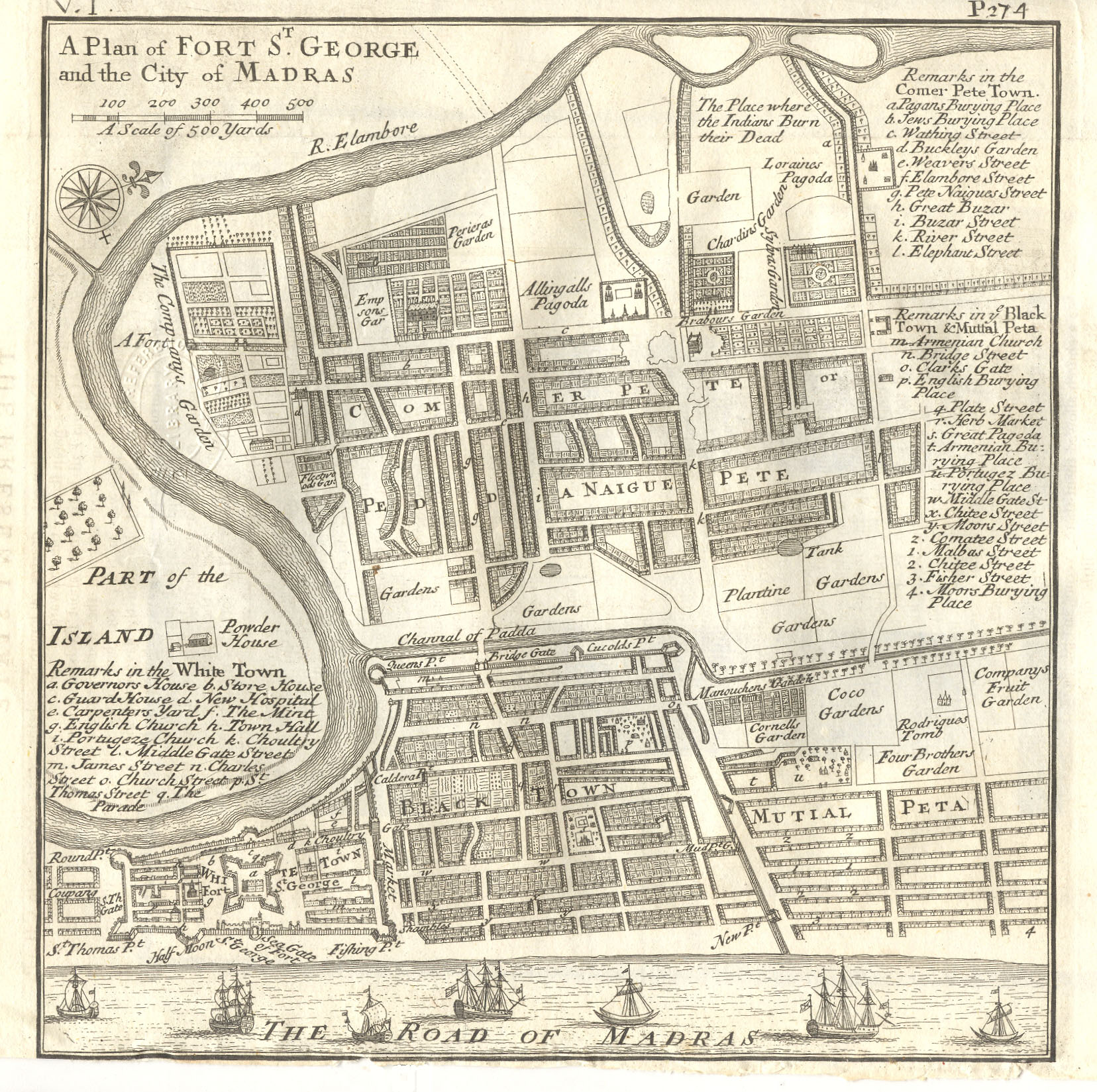
Plan of Fort St George and the city of Madras in 1726.

In 1637, Francis Day, then a member of the Masulipatnam Council and Chief of the Armagon Factory, undertook a voyage of exploration down the Coromandel Coast, as far as Pondicherry. At that time, the Coromandel Coast was ruled by the Raja of Chandragiri through a local chief or Nayak, Damarla Venkatappa Nayak, who ruled the coast from Pulicat up to Santhome. He had his seat at Vandavasi (then anglicised as Wandiwash) and his brother, Ayyappa Nayak resided at Poonamallee.

It is widely presumed that Ayyappa Nayak was the one who wooed the English to choose the area comprising the modern-day Georgetown for settlement. Day and his superior, Andrew Cogan, investigated the proposed site and examined trading possibilities. The results were favorable and Day secured a grant offering the village of Madraspatnam to the English for a period of two years. The Grant was dated August 1639, and after obtaining the approval of the Factory at Masulipatnam and the Presidency of Bantam (in Java), the settlement of Madraspatnam was begun.

Day also had other reasons to choose Madras for a factory: the availability of cotton, and at a much cheaper rate, as acknowledged by the prosperous Portuguese settlement of Sao Tôme, the nearness of the Portuguese, upon whom could be counted as neutral spectators if not active supporters in times of war, particularly influenced the English in their choice, the land allocated under the grant to the English in 1639, was a piece of land lying between the river Cooum, almost at the point at which it enters the sea and another river known as Egmore river, also a factor of safety important in those turbulent times.

Day was, however, sorely criticised by captains of men-of-war, for his choice of the location of the fort, due to immense difficulties in anchoring ships in Madras Roads. This meant that at various important junctures in the Carnatic Wars, the powerful English fleet was rendered useless, having to weigh anchor and move out to sea at low tide. Merchantmen too found the same flaw, though for different reasons – they would have to wait until high tide to bring goods and passengers ashore or risk wetting them in the majula boats used as ferries between the fort and Madras Roads.

The chief difficulty, as usual with the English in those days, was lack of money. At last, in February 1640, Day and Cogan accompanied by a few factors and writers, a garrison of about 25 European soldiers and a few other European artificers, besides a Hindu powder-maker by name Naga Battan, proceeded to Madras and started the English factory. They reached Madraspatnam on 20 February; and this date is important because it marks the first actual settlement of the English at the place.

== Construction of Fort St George ==
Day and Cogan were jointly responsible for the construction of Fort St George. The building of the Factory House was taken up on 1 March 1640. Some portion of the structure was presumably completed by St. George's Day (23 April) of that year and the name Fort St. George was consequently given to the Fort.

The bastions were first built and erection of the curtain walls connecting them proceeded more slowly as funds permitted. The whole Fort took fourteen years to construct and was finished only in 1653. It measured about 100 yards by north to south and by 80 yards east to west. On its northern and southern sides buildings and streets sprang up and constituted what came to be known later as the White Town.

Indian merchants and artificers were attracted to the settlement and encouraged to build houses therein under a promise of exemptions from import taxes for a period of thirty years. It is said that within the first year of the life of the settlement, there arose some seventy to eighty substantial houses to the north and south of the Fort while in the village of Madraspatnam nearly four hundred families of weavers had come to settle permanently.

== See also ==
- Governors of Madras

Preceded by Andrew Cogan	Agent of Madras; 1643–1644	Succeeded by Thomas Ivie
