= List of neighbourhoods of Chennai =

This is a list of areas and neighbourhoods in Chennai by region. The city, spanning an area of 1,189 square kilometres (459 sq mi), is divided on the basis of composition into four major parts: Central, North, South and West.

== Major parts ==
=== Central ===
Central Chennai is the commercial heart of the city and the downtown area. Suburban Chennai includes almost half of the places in the districts of Kancheepuram, Tiruvallur, Ranipet and Chengalpattu. Together with the Chennai City district, they form the Chennai metropolitan area.

=== North ===
North Chennai is primarily an industrial area while some areas are residential and ends with the Red Hills area.

- Anna Nagar
- Basin Bridge
- Broadway
- Ennore
- Erukanchery
- George Town
- ICF Colony
- Jamalia
- Kathirvedu
- Kathivakkam
- Kodungaiyur
- Korukkupet
- Kosapet
- Lakshmipuram
- Madhavaram
- Madhavaram Milk Colony
- M.K.B. Nagar
- Manali
- Manali New Town
- Manjambakkam
- Mannadi
- Mathur (Mathur MMDA, Periya Mathur, China Mathur) North Madras
- Minjur
- Moolakadai
- Naravarikuppam
- New Washermenpet
- Old Washermenpet
- Otteri
- Park Town
- Parry's Corner
- Pattalam
- Perambur
- Periamet
- Ponniammanmedu
- Pulianthope
- Puzhal
- Red Hills
- Royapuram
- Selavoyal
- Sembiam
- Surapet
- T.V.K. Nagar
- Tiruvottiyur
- Tondiarpet
- Vallalar Nagar
- Villivakkam
- Vyasarpadi

=== South ===
South Chennai, along with West Chennai, previously predominantly residential areas are fast turning into commercial areas, hosting a large number of IT and financial companies along the GST Road, OMR and NH 48. South Chennai ends with the Vandalur area.

- Adambakkam
- Adyar
- Alandur
- Besant Nagar
- Chetpet
- Chromepet
- Egmore
- Gopalapuram
- Guindy
- Hastinapuram
- Injambakkam
- Irumbuliyur
- Kadaperi
- Keelkattalai
- Kolappakkam
- Kottivakkam
- Kovilambakkam
- Madipakkam
- Mambakkam
- Medavakkam
- Mudichur
- Mylapore
- Nagalkeni
- Nanganallur
- Neelankarai
- Palavakkam
- Pallavaram
- Pallikaranai
- Pammal
- Pazhavanthangal
- Peerkankaranai
- Perungalathur
- Perungudi
- Pozhichur
- Pudupet
- Saidapet
- Selaiyur
- Sholinganallur
- Tambaram
- Taramani
- Teynampet
- Thiruvanmiyur
- Thoraipakkam
- Thousand Lights
- Triplicane
- T. Nagar
- Vandalur
- Varadharajapuram
- Velachery
- West Mambalam

=== West ===
West Chennai, along with South Chennai, previously predominantly residential areas are fast turning into commercial areas, hosting a large number of IT and financial companies along the GST Road, OMR and NH 48. West Chennai ends with the Tiruninravur area.

- Alapakkam
- Alwarthirunagar
- Ambattur
- Aminjikarai
- Arumbakkam
- Ashok Nagar
- Avadi
- Ayanavaram
- Ayappakkam
- CMDA Colony
- Defence Colony
- Gerugambakkam
- Iyyapanthangal
- Karambakkam
- K.K. Nagar
- Korattur
- Kovur
- Koyambedu
- Kundrathur
- Maduravoyal
- Mangadu
- Mannurpet
- M.G.R. Garden
- M.G.R. Nagar
- Mogappair
- Mowlivakkam
- Mugalivakkam
- Nandambakkam
- Nerkundrum
- Nesapakkam
- Nolambur
- Padi
- Pattabiram
- Poonamallee
- Porur
- Pudur
- Ramapuram
- Saligramam
- Sikkarayapuram
- Thirumangalam
- Thirumazhisai
- Thirumullaivayal
- Thirunindravur
- Thiruverkadu
- Vadapalani
- Valasaravakkam
- Virugambakkam

== Grouped by suburbs ==
=== Northern ===
- Athipattu
- Ennore
- Gummidipoondi
- Minjur
- Pazhaverkadu
- Ponneri
- Red Hills
- Sholavaram

=== Western ===
- Arakkonam
- Kadambathur
- Sriperumbudur
- Tamaraipakkam
- Tiruttani
- Tiruvallur

=== Southern-Eastern ===
- Chembarambakkam
- Guduvanchery
- Maraimalai nagar
- Singaperumalkoil
- Urapakkam

=== Along ECR and OMR ===
- Kanathur
- Kelambakkam
- Kovalam
- Muthukadu
- Siruseri
- Uthandi

== Satellite towns ==
Although technically not belonging to the Chennai Metropolitan Area (CMA), many of these satellite towns are referred to as being within Greater Chennai. In August 2011, R. Vaithilingam, the Minister for Housing and Urban Development, told the Assembly that the Tamil Nadu Government will decide on the expansion of the CMA before the end of the fiscal year. In view of the fast-paced development taking place in areas beyond the present metropolitan area jurisdiction, like Sriperumbudur, Kelambakkam, Tiruvallur and Mahabalipuram, it became necessary to review the Chennai Metropolitan Planning Area that was notified in 1973-74, Vaithilingam said.

- Chengalpattu (NH 45, GST Road)
- Gummidipoondi (NH 5)
- Mahabalipuram (ECR)
- Sriperumpudur (NH 48)
- Tiruvallur (NH 205)

== Important roads ==
- Anna Salai (Mount Road) (NH-45)
- Poonamallee High Road (NH-48)
- Inner Ring Road (100 Feet road or Jawaharlal Nehru road) (SH-2)
- Kamarajar Salai (Marina Beach road)
- Cenotaph Road
- North Usman Road
- South Usman Road
- Bazullah Road
- Chennai Bypass Road (puzhal-perungalathur)
- Habibullah Road
- Arcot Road (SH-113)
- Mount-Poonamallee Road (SH-55)
- Nungambakkam High Road
- Outer Ring Road
- Peters Road
- Sardar Patel Road
- Smith Road
- Whites Road
- Pallavaram - Kundrathur - Poonamallee Road (SH-113A)
- Pallavaram - Thuraipakkam Radial Road (SH-109)
- Velachery Main Road
- Vanagaram-Ambattur-Puzhal Road
- Tambaram Mudichur road (SH-48)
- East Coast Road (SH-49)
- Rajiv Gandhi Salai (Old Mahabalipuram Road) (SH-49A)
- Chennai-Tiruvallur High Road (NH-716)
- Erukkancherry High Road (NH-16)
- Grand Southern Trunk Road (GST Road) (NH-45)
- GST Road
- Avadi–Poonamallee–Mount High road (SH-55)
- Old Mahabalipuram Road (OMR)
- 200 feet Radial Road
- Poonamallee - Thiruvallur (SH-50)
- Poonamallee - Pattabiram High road (SH-206)
- Wallajah Road, Chennai
- Grand Northern Trunk Road (''GNT Road'') (NH-5)
- Thiruvotriyur High Road
