= Doveton, Chennai =

Doveton டவுட்டன்
- Neighbourhood
- Location within Chennai Location within Tamil Nadu Location within India
- Coordinates: 13.08699°N 80.25859°E
- Country: India
- State: Tamil Nadu
- District: Chennai
- Metro: Chennai
- Elevation: 5 m (16 ft)

Languages
  - Official: Tamil
- Time zone: UTC+5:30 (IST)
- PIN: 600007
- Telephone code: 044
- Planning agency: CMDA
- City: Chennai
- Civic agency: Greater Chennai Corporation

Doveton (Tamil: டவுட்டன்), is a neighbourhood in Purasawalkam and Vepery, and is a shopping district in Central Chennai, a metropolitan city in Tamil Nadu, India. It is the unofficial name of the neighbourhood in Purasawalkam.

The area of Doveton acquired its name after Sir John Doveton, who served as a captain commandant of the Seventh Regiment of Infantry. John Doveton is the Founder of the Doveton Group of Schools situated at Ritherdon Road, Vepery. One of the popular schools is Doveton Girls Higher Secondary School. The name Doveton originated by the presence of the Doveton group of schools in the area.

The Doveton clock tower is a prominent landmark and is located at the 5 road junction called Doveton Signal.

== Surroundings ==
- Purasawalkam
- Egmore
- Vepery
- Pattalam, Chennai
- Pulianthope
- Basin Bridge
- Otteri
- Perambur
- Kellys
- Kilpauk
- Choolai

== Nearby Railway stations ==
- Chennai Egmore railway station.
- Puratchi Thalaivar Dr. M. G. Ramachandran Central Railway Station.
