= Pathala Ponniamman Temple =

Amman Temple in Chennai district, Tamil Nadu, India

Religion
- Affiliation: Hinduism
- District: Chennai

Location
- Location: Kilpauk
- State: Tamil Nadu
- Country: India
- Geographic coordinates: 13°04′52.4″N 80°14′56.1″E
- Elevation: 33 m (108 ft)

Website
- hrce.tn.gov.in

Pathala Ponniamman Temple is an Amman temple located in the neighbourhood of Kilpauk in Chennai district of Tamil Nadu in India. This temple is under the control of Hindu Religious and Charitable Endowments Department. Since the temple is located near the border of Purasawalkam and Kilpauk, it is also called as 'Purasawalkam Pathala Ponniamman temple'. This temple's main deity goddess is the 'family deity' of about one lakh families of Chennai and its surrounding areas. Mostly women deities dominate worshipping this temple. 'Thirukkaappu pooja' is performed here at this temple daily in between 6:15 a.m. and 6:45 a.m.

== Beneficial neighbourhoods ==
Kilpauk, Purasawalkam, Kellys, Egmore, Chetpet, Ayanavaram, Otteri are some of the neighbourhoods benefited by this temple.

== Temple history ==
Chennappa Nayak belonging to Vijayanagara Empire ruled Madras (nowadays called as 'Chennai') 350 years ago. During his reign, the British, who had come here to do businesses, acquired land in the Purasawalkam area (nowadays 'Kilpauk area') on lease, for the purpose of agriculture. The area was filled with mango trees and flowering plants. For irrigation, needed plenty of water. So, the British officials ordered to dig a well as a source of water. During digging below a depth of about 30 feet, a big stone of obstacle was found. While removing it from the underground, it was found as a stone image of a deity goddess and also found along with it was an idol of deity goddess, made of 'Panchloha' (five metals). People surrounding that area worshipped the two, performed poojas, abhisheks, aradhanas, etc. Later, the stone image was established and consecrated as the main deity goddess with the name 'Pathala Ponniamman' and the Panchloha idol as the utsav deity goddess as 'Utsav Pathala Ponniamman'.

== Other deities ==
Maha Vishnu, Shiva, Parvathi, Natarajar, Dakshinamurthy, Vinayagar, Brahma, Durga, Narthaba Ganapathy, Murugan, Hanuman, Navagrahas, Kaala Bhairava, Naagars, Annanmaar and seven soldiers named as 'Parivaar deities' are the other important deities found in this temple.

== Religious tour ==
Hindu Religious and Charitable Endowments Department along with Tamil Nadu Tourism Development Corporation arranged tours to visit Amman temples in Chennai and its surrounding areas, in the Tamil month of 'Aadi', in two packages, from 8:00 a.m. to 8:00 p.m. Out of these two, one package includes a fee of ₹700, with a fast special darshan, Prashad and lunch. In this package, is planned to visit 10 temples including 'Pathala Ponniamman Temple' at Kilpauk.
