= Royapettah Clock Tower, Chennai =

Clock tower in Chennai, India

Royapettah Clock Tower
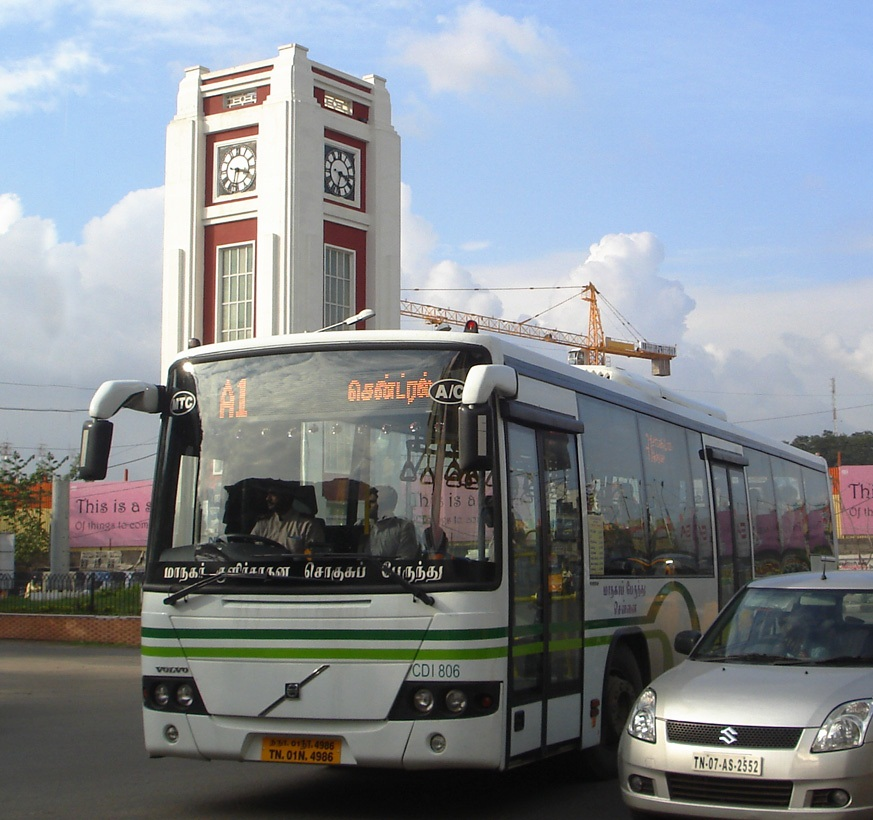
- A city bus passing by the Clock Tower
- Interactive map of Royapettah Clock Tower
- Location: West Cott Road, Royapettah, Chennai 600 014
- Coordinates: 13.05807°N 80.26512°E
- Type: Art deco
- Material: Concrete
- Completion date: 1930s

Royapettah Clock Tower is a standalone clock tower in the neighbourhood of Royapettah in Chennai, India. It is one of the four standalone clock towers in the city, the other three being the ones at Mint, Doveton and Pulianthope.

== History ==
Before the advent of clock towers, officers at Fort St. George used to fire cannonballs at 8:00 p.m. every day. This practice, which continued until the end of the 19th century, stopped after the construction of the first standalone clock tower at Doveton Junction at Purasawalkam in the early 1900s. Following this, similar towers were built at Mint Junction in George Town, Royapettah, and Pulianthope.

The Royapettah Clock Tower was built in the 1930s. The clock instrument for the Royapettah Clock Tower was provided by Gani and Sons, initially known as the South India Watch Company, which was started in 1909 by Haji Mirza Abdul Gani Namazi of Iranian descent. The company also provided clocks for the other independent clock towers at Mint, Choolai and Tiruvottiyur, among others.

== Location ==
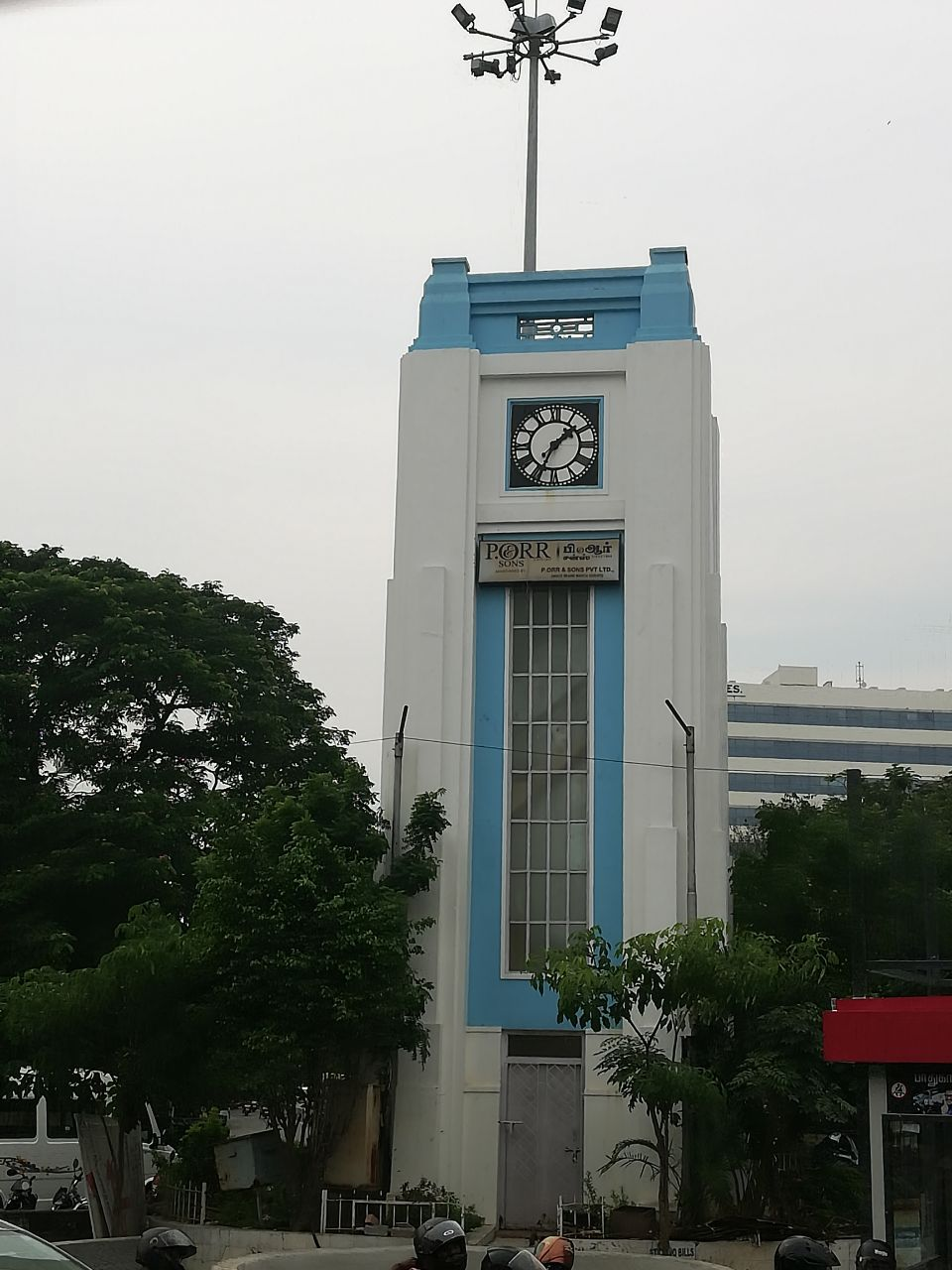
The clock tower in 2023

The clock tower is located in the neighbourhood of Royapettah, at the junction of Westcott Road, Whites Road, General Patters Road, and Pycrofts Road.

== The clock tower ==
The clock tower was built on the classic art deco architecture and remains one of the prime example of the style in the city.

In April 2021, the clock tower was adopted by the Rotary Club of Royapettah.

== See also ==
- Mint Clock Tower
- History of Chennai
- Heritage structures in Chennai

== Bibliography ==
- Muthiah, S. (1981). Madras Discovered. East West Books (Madras) Pvt Ltd.
