= Mint Clock Tower, Chennai =

Clock tower in George Town, India

Mint Clock Tower
- Location: George Town, Chennai
- Type: Art deco
- Material: Concrete
- Height: 60 feet (18 m)
- Opening date: 1948

Mint Clock Tower is a standalone clock tower in George Town, Chennai, India. It is one of the four standalone clock towers in Chennai, the other three being the ones at Royapettah, Doveton and Pulianthope.

== History ==
The first standalone clock tower in the city was built at Doveton Junction at Purasawalkam in the early 1900s. Before the tower was built, until the end of the 19th century, officers at Fort St. George used to fire cannonballs at 8:00 p.m. every day. This practice, however, stopped after the construction of the first standalone clock tower. Following this, a similar tower was built at Mint Junction in George Town.

The clock at the tower was built by Gani and Sons, initially known as the South India Watch Company, which was started in 1909 by Haji Mirza Abdul Gani Namazi of Iranian descent. It is the company that also provided clocks for the independent clock towers at Royapettah, Choolai and Tiruvottiyur among others. The clock tower was inaugurated in 1948 by the then Mayor of Madras U. Krishna Rao.

== Location ==
The clock tower is located at the Mint Junction, where Basin Bridge Road, North Wall Road, Mint Street, and Old Jail Road meet.

== Features ==
The clock tower remains a classic example of art deco architecture in the city. The features of the clock tower include linear model, thin lines, high use of cement concrete, rich usage of colours and fewer floral engravings. The architectural style of the clock tower was influenced by the Industrial and the French revolutions, as were the other clock towers and cinema theatres built in the city in the 1900s.

The tower is 60 feet (18 m) high. Each of the dials on the clock is made of aluminium and measures 4 feet (1.2 m) in diameter. The clock has a pendulum, a swinging weight, as its time-keeping element and runs on weight-driven mechanism. The internal mechanism consists of six iron plates tied to a metal rope, which are connected to a chain of wheels. As the wheels rotate, they move the iron plates down, moving the brass pointer on the dial. The clock has to be manually wound using a spanner as key once every 30 hours. The clock stops working, however, once the plates hit the floor. The plates are lifted manually once a week by keying it.

== Renovation ==
The clock had been defunct for several decades. In 2013, following the construction of Mint flyover at the junction, the Corporation decided to revive the clock tower. In January 2014, the Chennai Corporation and P. Orr & Sons jointly completed renovating the tower. On 17 January 2014, the clock was run on a trial basis following repairs.

== See also ==
- Royapettah Clock Tower
- History of Chennai
- Heritage structures in Chennai

== Bibliography ==
- Muthiah, S. (1981). Madras Discovered. East West Books (Madras) Pvt Ltd.
