= Kosapet =

- Neighbourhood
- Kosapet Kosapet (Tamil Nadu) Kosapet (India)
- Coordinates: 13°05′32.0″N 80°15′18.6″E
- Country: India
- State: Tamil Nadu
- Metro: Chennai
- Elevation: 33 m (108 ft)

Languages
  - Official: Tamil
- Time zone: UTC+5:30 (IST)

Kosapet is a neighbourhood of Chennai. The name is a corruption of Kuyavar Pettai ("Potter's Locality"), and originated due to the concentration of potters and artisans in this area. The area is Ward 98 (Zone 7) of Chennai Corporation.

Kosapet is situated near Purasawalkam. Kuyavar Pettai is the original name. The locality is popular for many events and festival celebrations which is unique in every street. Kandasami temple which is one of the oldest temples in this area is famous for its festivals such as bramha utsav, kandasasti and other celebrations. There is a tank which belongs to the temple; it helps to keep the ground water level intact.

== Festivals ==
- Sri Aathi Mottai Amman Jathirai
- Arulmigu Kandhaswamy Kovil vaigasi bramorchavam
- Sri Sakthi Devi Vellathaman Jathirai
- Sri Vaembu Aathi Muthumari Amman Aadi Thiruvizha (Chinna Thambi St)
- Sri Aathi Padavattamman Vilaku Poojai (31 Dec)

== Neighbourhoods ==
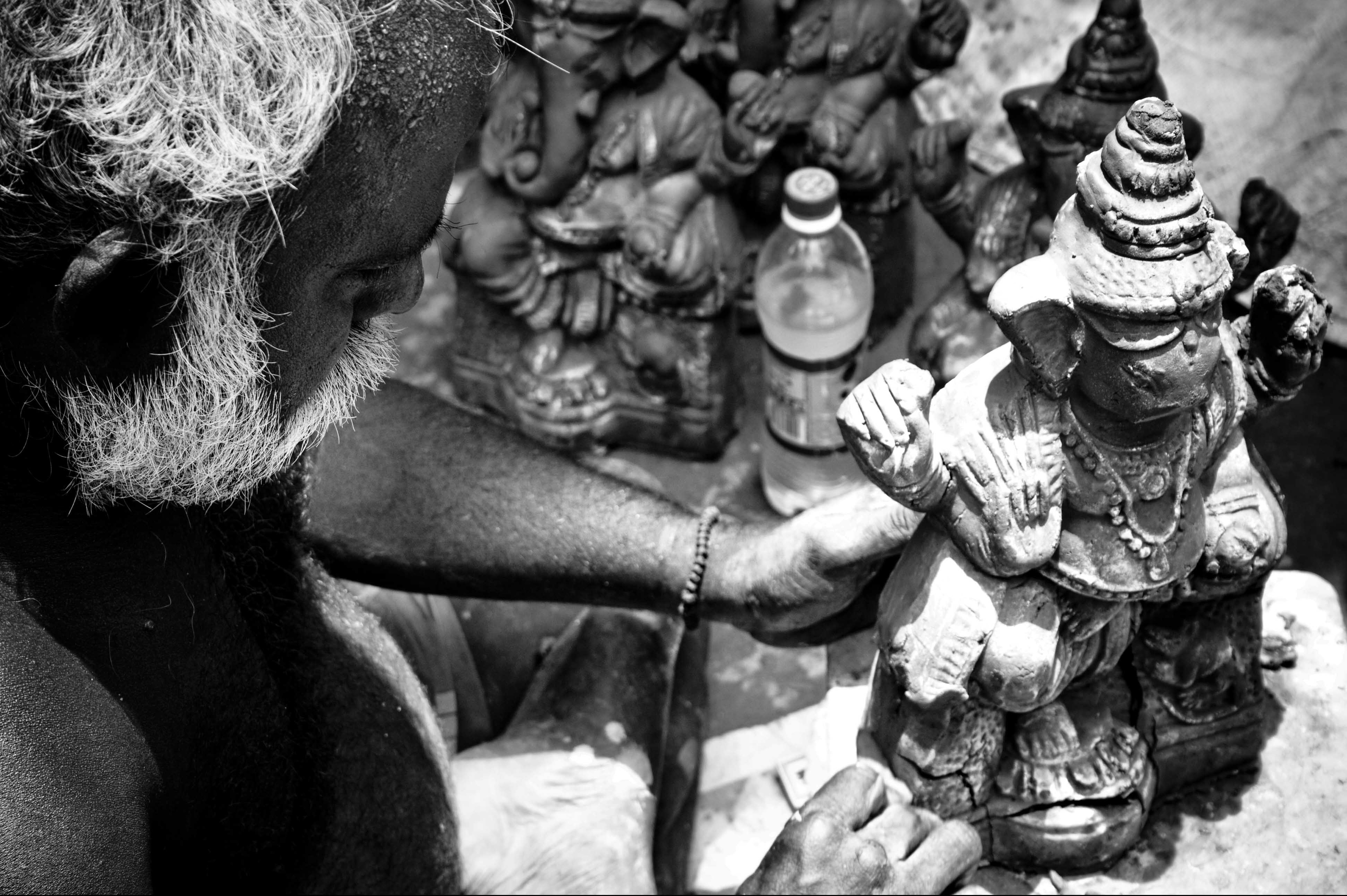
A potter making a Clay Pillayar idol in Kusapettai

- Purasawalkam
- Otteri
- Pattalam
- Perambur
- Choolai

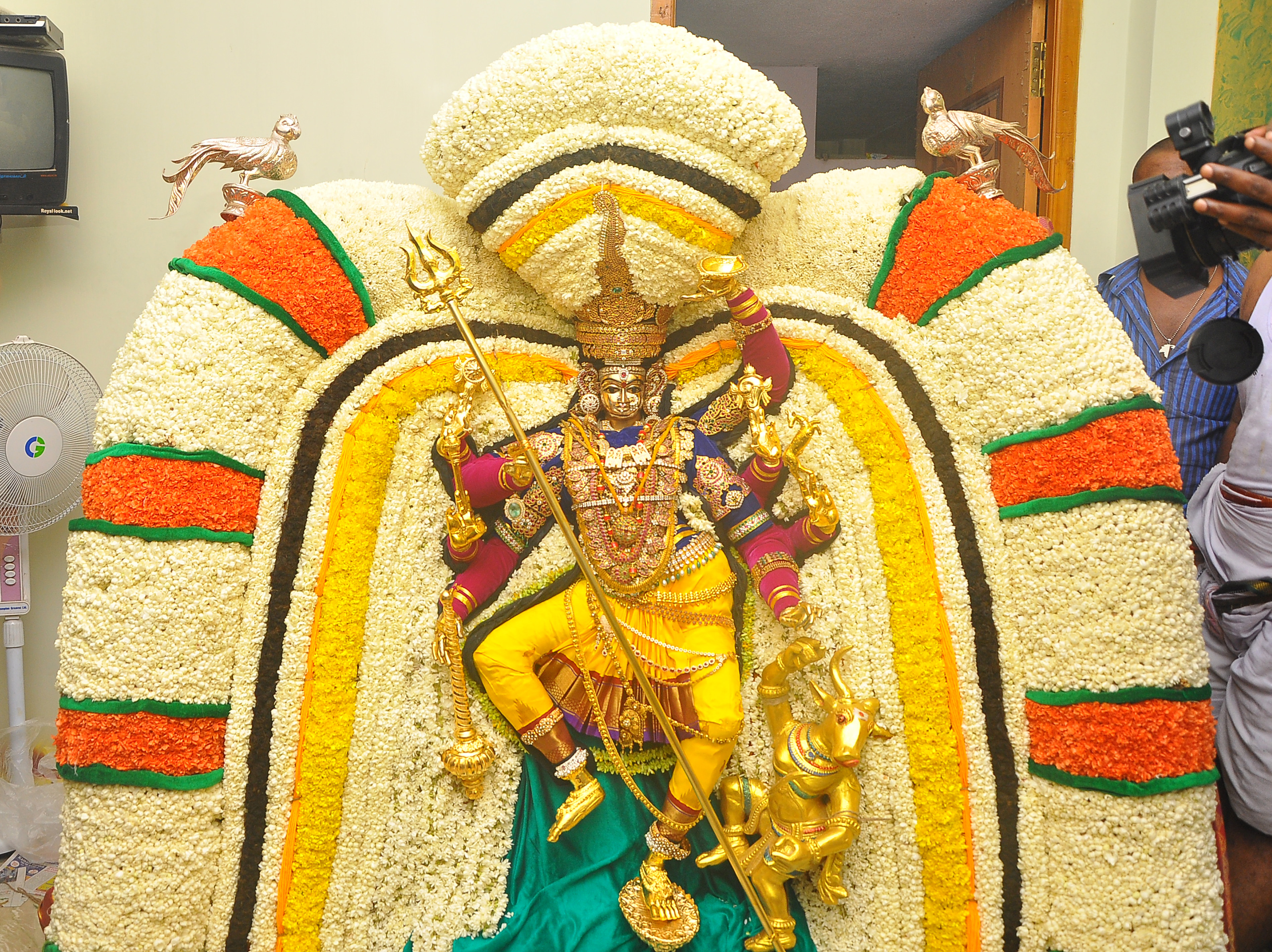
Sri Vaembu Aathi Muthumari Amman Temple
