= Otteri =

- Neighbourhood
- Location within Chennai Location within Tamil Nadu Location within India
- Coordinates: 13.098038°N 80.251197°E
- Country: India
- State: Tamil Nadu
- District: Chennai
- Metro: Chennai
- Elevation: 5 m (16 ft)

Languages
  - Official: Tamil
- Time zone: UTC+5:30 (IST)
- PIN: 600012
- Telephone code: 044
- Planning agency: CMDA
- City: Chennai
- Civic agency: Chennai Corporation

Otteri is a developed residential area in Central Chennai, a metropolitan city in Tamil Nadu, India. Otteri is a part of Purasaiwakkam but is too distinct to be called hence locals simply refer it as Otteri.

== Police station ==
- There is a police station on Cooks road in Otteri, viz., 'Otteri Police station'.

== Location ==
Otteri is located between Perambur and Ayanavaram and is a part of Purasaiwalkam.

== Roads ==
- Cooks road
- Ayanavaram road
- Strahans road
- Brick kiln road
- Perambur Barracks road
- Purasawalkam High road
- DeMellows road
- Perambur High road
- Pulianthope High road.

== Surroundings ==
- Purasawalkam
- Perambur
- Ayanavaram
- Kellys
- Kilpauk
- Egmore
- Vepery
- Doveton
- Pulianthope
- Pattalam, Chennai
- Basin Bridge
- Vyasarpadi
- Choolai
