= Doveton (disambiguation) =

Doveton is a suburb in Melbourne, Australia.

Doveton may also refer to:

== People ==
- Diana Doveton (1910–1987), English badminton player
- Dorothy Doveton (1913—1992), English-South African human geographer
- John Doveton (1768–1847), British military officer
- Doveton Sturdee (1859–1925), British naval officer

== Places ==
- Doveton, Chennai, a neighbourhood in Chennai, India
- Electoral district of Doveton, a former district of the Victorian Legislative Assembly
