= Purasawalkam Gangadeeswarar Temple =

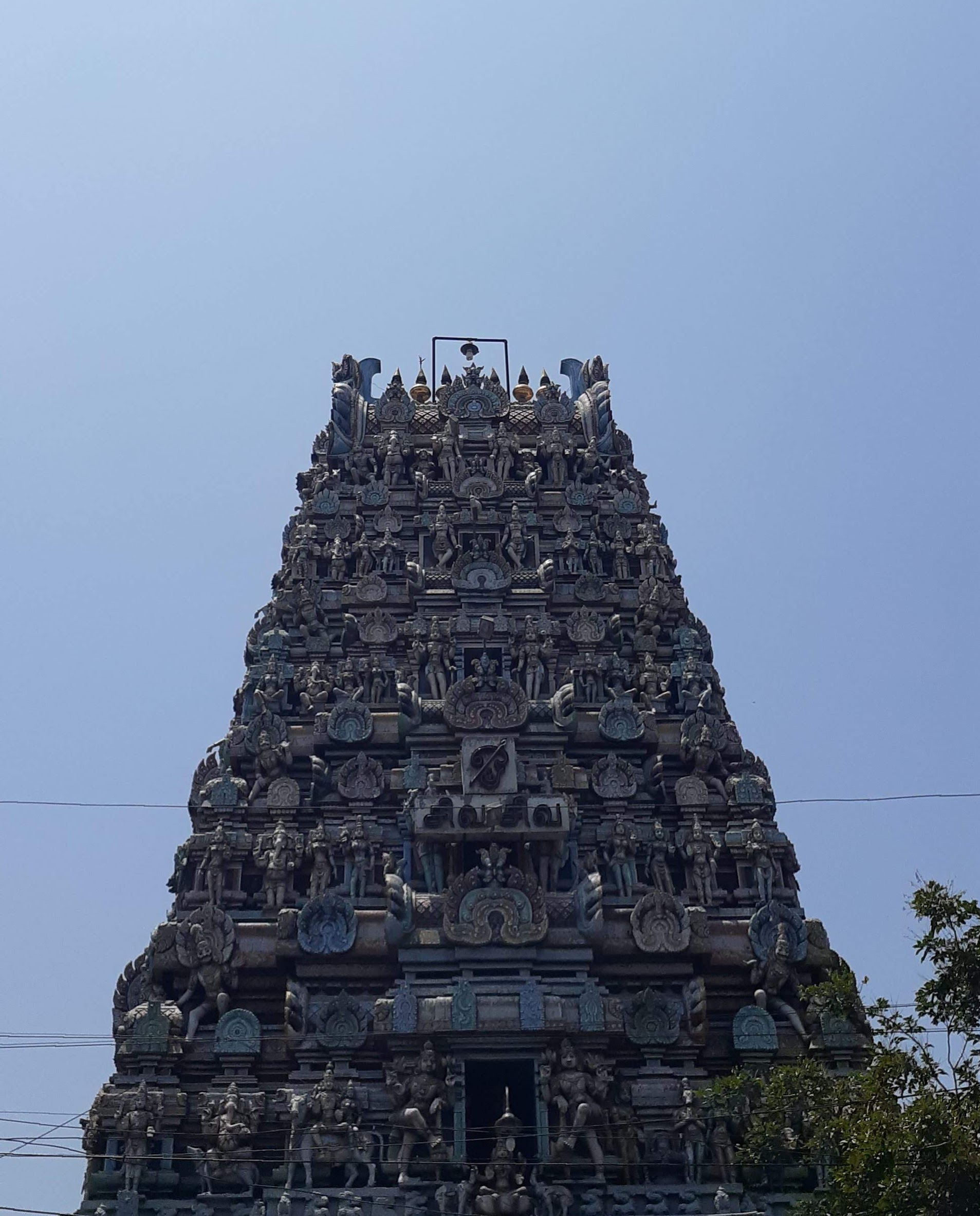
- Historical famous Shri Gangadeeshwarar temple, Purasawalkam, Chennai, Tamil Nadu, India.

Religion
- Affiliation: Hinduism
- District: Chennai district
- Festivals: Maha Shivaratri, Theppa Utsavam

Location
- Location: Gangadeeswarar Temple Street, Purasawalkam
- State: Tamil Nadu
- Country: India
- Interactive map of Purasawalkam Gangadeeswarar Temple
- Coordinates: 13.084645°N 80.254325°E

Architecture
- Elevation: 53 m (174 ft)

Website
- https://hrce.tn.gov.in/hrcehome/index_temple.php?tid=232

Purasawalkam Gangadeeswarar Temple is a Shiva Temple situated in Purasawalkam neighbourhood of Chennai district in Tamil Nadu state in the peninsular India. It is a five-tiered temple. The main deity of this temple is Gangadeeswarar and deity goddess is Pankajambal. This temple is maintained under the control of Hindu Religious and Charitable Endowments Department, Government of Tamil Nadu. This temple is considered to have the same glory as Kashi Vishwanath Temple. This is the shrine of the 108th Shiv Lingam consecrated by Bhagirathan, a descendant of Sagaran of the Raghu dynasty. The temple was built, renovated and repaired by Kulothunga Chola II.

Gangadeeswarar temple is located at an altitude of about 53 m above the mean sea level with the geographical coordinates of 13.084645°N 80.254325°E.

Theppa Utsavam is usually held for 3 days on the occasion of Thai Poosa festival every year in the Pond (Theppakulam) in this very ancient temple. A canal has also been constructed to bring water to this temple pond.

Rain water harvesting is done on the roads around the temple and to make rain water connections to store the rain water from them in the temple tank and to filter in them to store clean water. Under the 'Singhara Chennai 2.0' project, an action has been taken by the Chennai Metro Water, Sewage and Sewerage Works department.

Sathya Narayana Perumal, Brahma, Banalingam, Nandi, Dakshinamurthy, Oontreeswarar, Vaitheeswarar, Kurunthamalleeswarar, Kashi Vishwanath, Chandikeswarar, Somaskandar, Durga, Mahaganapathy, Uchchishta Ganapathy with consort Siddhi, Shanmugar, Subramaniar with consorts Valli and Deivana, Sun, Moon, Navagrahas, Thirunavukkarasar, Sambandar, Sundarar, Manikkavasakar, Nagar, Bhagirathan, Sekkillhar, Kulachirainayanar, 63 nayanmars and Bhairava are the other deities in this temple to bless the devotees.

== See also ==
- Heritage structures in Chennai
