= Villivakkam Lake =

Lake in Chennai, India

- Location within Chennai
- Location: Villivakkam, Chennai, India
- Coordinates: 13.106°N 80.197°E
- Type: Pond
- Primary outflows: Otteri Nullah
- Basin countries: India
- Surface area: 36.34 acres (14.71 ha)
- Settlements: Chennai

Villivakkam Lake (Villivakkam Aeri) is a lake spread over 36.34 acres in Villivakkam, Chennai, India. The lake is located to the south of the neighbourhood of Villivakkam, adjacent to the thickly populated Sidco Nagar, and drains into the Otteri Nullah. The lake belongs to the Chennai Metro Water Supply and Sewerage Board.

== Boundaries and drainage ==
The lake used to be much larger until some decades ago. A 1972 estimate says the lake was about 214 acres then. However, it has now shrunk to about 20 acres of water area. The boundaries of the lake include Jawaharlal Nehru Road (Inner ring road) and Padi railway station on the west, Chennai–Tiruvallur High Road on the south, SIDCO Nagar Industrial Estate on the east, and residential areas on the north. Excess water from the lake is currently being released through the southern portion to Otteri Nullah.

== Encroachments ==
The lake had an area of 214 acres in 1972. However, due to indiscriminate construction of buildings around the lake, eventually eating into the lake, about 83 percent of the lake had been encroached. By 2017, the area of the lake reduced to 36.34 acres. In addition to encroachments, the lake is dotted with dumped construction debris, illegal settlements, railway line, and high-tension power line. The western and southern sides remain the most encroached portions of the lake.

== Developments ==
In 2017, the Chennai Corporation developed an eco-restoration plan which included development of floating gardens in the lake. This involves development of a floating raft of phytoremediation plants in the lake to absorb pollutants from the lake. Of the 36.34 acres of the remaining lake, Chennai Metrowater is using 11.5 acres for operating its sewer network. Thus only 24.84 acres of the lake is available for eco-restoration. The work began in 2018 at a cost of ₹ 160 million. Of the 36.5 acres, the Metrowater will develop a sewage pumping station and augmentation of water supply facility in an area of 11.5 acres.

There are also plans to connect existing storm-water drains to the lake as the lake does not have inlets for the drains. Other infrastructural plans included solar-powered sensors to monitor pollution levels, an open-air theatre, play area for children, Aavin milk parlour, parking lot, basketball court, immersed aerator, and a new bitumen road parallel to the railway line.

As of March 2020, a water museum has been planned at the lake at a cost of ₹ 200 million.

== See also ==
- Water management in Chennai
