= Thillu Mullu =

1981 film by K. Balachander

- Theatrical release poster
- Directed by: K. Balachander
- Screenplay by: Visu
- Based on: Gol Maal
- Produced by: P. R. Govindarajan; J. Duraisamy
- Starring: Rajinikanth
- Cinematography: B. S. Lokanath
- Edited by: N. R. Kittu
- Music by: M. S. Viswanathan
- Production company: Kalakendra Movies
- Release date: 1 May 1981
- Running time: 136 minutes
- Country: India
- Language: Tamil

Thillu Mullu (transl. Hanky-panky) is a 1981 Indian Tamil-language comedy film directed by K. Balachander and written by Visu. A remake of the 1979 Hindi film Gol Maal, which itself is also a remake of the 1961 Bengali film Kanamachhi, it stars Rajinikanth, with Thengai Srinivasan, Nagesh, Poornam Viswanathan, Sowcar Janaki, Madhavi and Viji Chandrasekhar in supporting roles. The film is about Chandran, who lies to his boss to get a leave but gets caught. To save his job, he is forced to pretend to his boss that he has a twin brother.

Thillu Mullu was released on 1 May 1981. Critics particularly praised Rajinikanth's performance, as he was known for doing mainly action films until that point in his career. A remake of the same name, directed by Badri, was released in 2013.

== Plot ==
Aiyampettai Arivudainambi Kaliyaperumal Chandran is a graduate in search of his first job. He and his sister Uma have no relatives or acquaintances except their doctor/family friend. The doctor advises him to attend an interview for a job at his friend Sriramachandramurthy's import-export company. Sriramachandramurthy is a man of traditional values. He is a sports fan but thinks lowly of youngsters involved in sports. He believes that men without moustaches are characterless.

Chandran has a moustache; the doctor advises Chandran to take care of the other problems by acting in a manner Sriramachandramurthy appreciates: namely wearing a Nehru jacket for a usual dress given the poverty in the country, always telling his name in full, giving importance to his moustache, behaving decently, showing a lack of interest in sports and drama considering that they do not promote any wellbeing to the home or the country, respecting one's parents, and detesting the concept of having someone else recommend a person for jobs instead of recommending for oneself. He impresses Sriramachandramurthy who hires him immediately.

One day, Chandran and his friends decide to take leave by lying to their respective bosses and attend a football match. The next day, he gets a call in his office which Sriramachandramurthy picks up, wherein he is informed that Chandran's mother (who actually died many years ago) has fallen ill, instead of the lie that was planned originally. Despite realising that his friend messed up, he goes to watch the football match. Sriramachandramurthy, who attends the match as well, sees him there. The next day, Sriramachandramurthy queries Chandran about what he witnessed. To escape from the ire of his boss and being fired from his first job, he decides to lie. Remembering the plot of a film his friend, actor Nagesh is shooting, Chandran convinces Sriramachandramurthy that he had seen his moustache-less identical twin Indran at the stadium. Sriramachandramurthy buys his argument and feels bad about accusing him. He makes amends by hiring "Indran" to teach his daughter Sarojini music.

Chandran is forced to lead a dual life: as a sincere hardworking employee under his real name, and as Sarojini's music teacher Indran; subsequently, Sarojini and "Indran" fall in love. A boy named Kattabomman who works at Sriramachandramurthy's house knows about Chandran's secret and blackmails him regularly. Sriramachandramurthy later asks Chandran to meet his mother. Chandran, with Nagesh's help, requests a wealthy socialite, Meenakshi Duraiswamy, to pose as Chandran's widowed mother. Chandran ultimately tells Sarojini the truth. Sarojini's friend tells him to tell Sriramachandramurthy as well, but he is reluctant to do so. Chandran goes to Sriramachandramurthy with Sarojini, but when Chandran refuses to give Kattabomman ₹5,000 (equivalent to ₹110,000 or US$1,200 in 2026), Kattabomman tells Sriramachandramurthy about Chandran's false moustache, giving away the secret. Sriramachandramurthy however ends up thinking that Indran impersonated Chandran to marry Sarojini. He then chases Chandran, whom he thinks is Indran, across the city via car to kill him. Due to his rash driving, he seemingly cripples Uma during the chase.

Sriramachandramurthy is sued by lawyer Charuhasan on Chandran's behalf for injuring Uma. Sriramachandramurthy is, for the most part, scared during the lawyer's monologue, but eventually realises that he is being fooled again — this time by Charuhasan, who is actually an actor hired by Chandran, while Uma was not actually crippled in the chase. At this point, all the main characters approach Sriramachandramurthy and tell him the truth. A visibly confused and shaken Sriramachandramurthy locks himself in a room, and comes out with his moustache shaved off, feeling that he does not need something which caused so much trouble. Sriramachandramurthy then laments to a picture of Muruga about his foolishness. As he does so, the picture of Muruga changes into that of Ganesha; the voice of Ganesha apologises to him as he was also involved in fooling him.

== Cast ==
- Rajinikanth as Aiyampettai Arivudainambi Kaliyaperumal Chandran / Indran
- Thengai Srinivasan as Sriramachandramurthy
- Nagesh as himself
- Poornam Viswanathan as the doctor
- Sowcar Janaki as Meenakshi Duraiswamy
- Maadhavi as Sarojini
- Viji Chandrasekhar as Uma
- Gundu Kalyanam as one of Chandran's friends
- Master Chandrasekhar as Kattabomman
- Jhansi as Rajam, Sarojini's aunt
- Sethu Vinayagam as one of Chandran's friends

Uncredited

- Kamal Haasan as Charuhasan (cameo appearance)
- Visu (cameo appearance)
- Lakshmi (cameo appearance)
- Pratap Pothen (cameo appearance)

== Production ==
In 1979, K. Balachander began developing a Tamil remake of the Hindi film Gol Maal, released earlier the same year. By June 1980, Rajinikanth and Madhavi were confirmed to star in the still untitled remake. The film, which would later be titled Thillu Mullu, was Rajinikanth's first full-length comedy film. He initially doubted whether he would be able to pull off a comedy film, and instead suggested that Balachander consider an established comedian like Nagesh; Balachander refused since he wanted a hero, not a comedian, and Balachander assured that he would guide him through the process. Rajinikanth hoped that people, who considered him to be made for "rough roles", would change their perspective after seeing the film; he accepted the film due to Balachander's suggestion that he should do try to break the stereotyped action hero mould for which he was known at the time. Rajinikanth was initially reluctant to shave his moustache to portray his character, given the success he had with it but ultimately did so, making Thillu Mullu the first film which featured him without one. It was also Rajinikanth and Balachander's last film together.

Thengai Srinivasan was recruited to play Sriramachandramurthy. Balachander recalled, "Normally I try to get all actors to modulate the dialogue in a particular manner but for this character I wanted Thengai to do it in his style, so instead of teaching him, I asked him how he would like to do the scene and then developed on it. I wanted him to play it as a character and not as a comedian for I felt that the humour would come out on its own through his unique body language and dialogue delivery". Nagesh appeared as himself. Viji Chandrasekhar made her acting debut with this film, playing the sister of Chandran. The character is a skater, and Balachander cast her as such after noticing her carrying roller skates. At Balachander's insistence, Kamal Haasan made a cameo appearance as Charuhasan, an actor posing as a lawyer in the climax of the film. During the film's shooting, Rajinikanth met his future wife Latha, then a student of Ethiraj College for Women, who went to interview him for her college magazine. Some scenes were also shot at Janaki's house at Cenotaph Road.

The screenplay was written by Visu, with Ananthu assisting. B. S. Lokanath and N. R. Kittu served as cinematographer and editor respectively. The film was produced by P. R. Govindarajan and J. Duraisamy under Kalakendra Movies.

== Themes and influences ==
Film critic Naman Ramachandran identifies one scene where Chandran pulls a prank on the doctor who then remarks that whatever else he accomplishes in life he will always be a good actor, as a "meta" moment. He also identified the name of Haasan's character Charuhasan as a reference to Haasan's real-life brother, and the scene where Charuhasan incites several legal points actually incorporate the titles of many hit films of Haasan. R. Balu, teacher at Hindu Theological Higher Secondary School claimed the plot of Thillu Mullu and Gol Maal was taken from his stage play Casual Leave.

== Soundtrack ==
The music was composed by M. S. Viswanathan, with lyrics by Kannadasan. The song "Raagangal Pathinaaru" is set in the Carnatic raga known as Abheri.

Track listing
No.	Title	Singer(s)	Length
1.	"Raagangal Pathinaaru"	S. P. Balasubrahmanyam	4:27
2.	"Thillu Mullu"	S. P. Balasubrahmanyam	4:40
3.	"Thangangale Thambigale"	Malaysia Vasudevan	4:24
4.	"Andhi Neram"	Vani Jairam	4:27
Total length:			17:58

== Release and reception ==
Thillu Mullu was released on 1 May 1981. The review board of Ananda Vikatan, in a review dated 24 May 1981, gave the film a B rating, equal to 45 out of 100. Kutty Krishnan of Kalki praised Balachander for making a clean comedy film while also praising the performances of cast and technical crew and added that the film manages to sustain the interest of audiences. Tribune stated in 1982, "It is not often that Producer/Director K. Balachandar launches out on films in lighter vein, and this film is one such all revealing exception, of his deft touch in this field too." Naagai Dharuman of Anna praised the acting of the cast, cinematography, music, dialogues and direction and appreciated Balachander for making a comedy film with believable funny scenes without making it boring and for making Rajinikanth do a full-length comedy role.

== Legacy ==
On the centenary of Indian cinema in April 2013, Forbes India included the performances of Rajinikanth and Thengai Sreenivasan in the film on its list, "25 Greatest Acting Performances of Indian Cinema". On 1 July 2013, coinciding with International Joke Day, actors and writers of comedy were asked to name their favourite film. Comedian and film critic Bosskey named Thillu Mullu as his favourite comedy film, stating: "Thengaai Srinivasan is my all-time favourite. [..] and the interview scene in Thillu Mullu can enliven any boring day".

== Remake ==
Thillu Mullu was remade in 2013 with the same title, directed by Badri. It featured re-worked versions of the title song and "Raagangal Pathinaaru". In an interview with IndiaGlitz in 2016, Visu expressed dissatisfaction with the remake.

== Bibliography ==
- Ramachandran, Naman (2014) [2012]. Rajinikanth: The Definitive Biography. New Delhi: Penguin Books. ISBN 978-81-8475-796-5.
- Krissna, Suresh; Rangarajan, Malathi (2012). My Days with Baasha. Westland Ltd. ISBN 978-93-8162-629-0.
- Sundararaman (2007) [2005]. Raga Chintamani: A Guide to Carnatic Ragas Through Tamil Film Music (2nd ed.). Chennai: Pichhamal Chintamani. OCLC 295034757.
