= Kellys =

- Neighbourhood
- Location within Chennai Location within Tamil Nadu Location within India
- Coordinates: 13°05′08.8″N 80°14′39.7″E
- Country: India
- State: Tamil Nadu
- District: Chennai
- Metro: Chennai
- Elevation: 33 m (108 ft)

Languages
  - Official: Tamil
- Time zone: UTC+5:30 (IST)
- PIN: 600010
- Telephone code: 044
- Planning agency: CMDA
- City: Chennai
- Civic agency: Greater Chennai Corporation

Kellys (Tamil: கெல்லீஸ்), is a sub locality of Kilpauk, and it is an important road junction in Central Chennai. Its too distinct to be addressed as a part of Kilpauk by the locals and hence they simply refer to the area as Kellys. It is proposed to implement phase II of Metro railway projects from Madhavaram to SIPCOT in Siruseri, which is corridor number 3. The route includes the areas of Madhavaram Milk Colony, Thapal petti, Murari Hospital, Moolakadai, Sembiyam, Perambur Market, Perambur Metro, Ayanavaram, Otteri, Pattalam, Perambur Barracks Road, Doveton Junction, Purasawakkam High Road and Kellys. From Kellys to Siruseri via. Chetpet, the route continues. In this corridor, comes Kellys, through which tunnelling works are to be carried out. For this, Tunnel Boring Machines from China, are to be used. The Metro railway projects are undertaken by L & T limited and to be completed by 52 months.

== Neighborhoods ==
- Purasawalkam
- Kilpauk
- Ayanavaram
- Egmore
- Puratchi Thalaivar Dr.M.G.Ramachandran Central railway station
- Chennai Egmore railway station
- Periamet
- Doveton
- Otteri
- Chetput.

== Roads ==
- Purasawalkam High road
- Balfour Road
- Medavakkam Tank road
- BSNL office road
