= Old Jail Road, Chennai =

Street in Chennai, India

Old Jail Road
- Basin Bridge Road, Ibrahim Sahib Street, North Wall Road
- Interactive map of Old Jail Road
- Maintained by: Corporation of Chennai
- Length: 1.43 mi (2.30 km); The total length includes 700 m as Basin Bridge Road, 750 m as Old Jail Road and 850 m as Ibrahim Sahib Street.
- Coordinates: 13°6′18″N 80°17′4″E
- East end: Rajaji Salai, Chennai
- West end: GNT Road, Vallalar Nagar, Chennai

Old Jail Road is one of the peripheral roads that border the historical neighbourhood and commercial centre of George Town in Chennai, India. The road marks the northern boundary of the neighbourhood and is officially divided into three, namely, from west to east, the Basin Bridge Road, the Old Jail Road, and the Ibrahim Sahib Street. The road joins the Grand Northern Trunk (GNT) Road at the Wall Tax Road–GNT Road junction in the west and the Rajaji Salai in the east.

The road, serving as a reminder of the neighbourhood's historical past, is address to many historic places such as the Government Stanley Medical College, Monegar Choultry, and Seven Wells pumping station.

== History ==
The road got its name from the civil debtors' prison established by the British in 1692. The prison was initially housed under a section of a protective wall, known as the old town wall, constructed to the north of the road by Paul Benfield between 1769 and 1772, marking the northern end of Black Town (the present-day George Town). Similar to a previous protective stone wall built in the middle of the 17th century, enclosures in the wall served as cells for prisoners. The prison was established near the western end of the wall. The law of the then British Government mandated that the expenses of the prison's inmates, who were primarily money defaulters, be borne by their respective complainants. By 1793, Old Jail Road was much improved under Sheriff Edward Atkinson. By the early 1800s, the prison was moved to the location where Bharathi Women's College stands today, on the corner of Popham's Broadway. In 1804, the jail was named the Civil Jail. With the advent of the Central prison next to the Government General Hospital in the middle of the 19th century, the civil debtors' prison became known as the Old Jail and was put to civilian use. After Independence, the Old Jail was vacated and its inmates were moved to the Central Prison.

Since then, the facility housed various educational institutions. In 1916, the Madras Trades School was established, which used the buildings on the old jail campus. By 1938, it grew into the School of Technology and in 1946 as Central Polytechnic. Shortly after Independence, under the insistence of Kamaraj, a cottage industries training centre of the Congress Prachar Sabha was started on the campus, sharing the premises with the Polytechnic. In 1955, the printing section of the Polytechnic was converted into the country's first Regional School of Printing. In 1958, the Polytechnic moved to Adyar, and the Old Jail campus remained the Regional School of Printing, sharing the campus with the cottage industries training centre until the training centre was closed in 1964. Meanwhile, a new women's arts college was established, which too shared the campus with the School of Printing. When the School of Printing moved to Adyar in 1968, the women's college increased its enrolment and occupied the whole of the Old Jail campus. The college was named Bharati Women's College and remains to the present day.

Water to the Fort St. George and the expanding city surrounding the fort was supplied by the Seven Wells (known locally as 'Yezhu Kinaru') pumping station located on the road. On a night in 1767, when Nawab Hyder Ali of Mysore fought the British in Madras, his troops tried to poison the water source. However, the plan was averted by an Anglo-Indian named John Nicolas. In return of gratitude, Nicolas was made the Superintendent of Seven Wells Water Works by the British government when the pumping station started supplying water again from 1772. Thus the first organised water supply in Madras began with the Seven Wells Scheme. In addition to the authority to head the pumping station, Nicolas was given a house, horse and a palanquin. The descendants of the Nicolas family inherited the authority until the end of 1925.

In 1781, a great famine struck Madras, which lasted till 1784. The affected people sought asylum in a locality on the Old Jail Road to whom porridge was provided. In 1782, the spot was converted to a choultry for asylum-seekers, chiefly elderly people. The choultry was named the Monegar Choultry after Maniakkaran, a village headman. Later, the choultry was moved to another location giving way to an infirmary, named the Madras Native Infirmary, established in 1799. Known as the 'Kanji Thotti Hospital' (meaning 'porridge bowl hospital'), the hospital was named Stanley Hospital in 1933, after George Frederick Stanley, the then Governor of Madras. The choultry still functions as an asylum for elderly people.

== The present-day road ==
The long stretch of road that was the northern bounds of Black Town, which later came to be known as George Town, is today officially designated as, from west to east, Basin Bridge Road, Old Jail Road and Ebrahim Sahib Street. Although the actual road stretches to about 2.3 km from west to east, the name 'Old Jail Road', as identified today, covers only about 750 metres from the Mint Clock Tower to Bharati Women's College. The streets that radiate from Old Jail Road, including the Portuguese Church Street, Old Jail Lane, Anna Pillai Street, and Peddu Naicken Street, are now home to dense residential and commercial establishments.

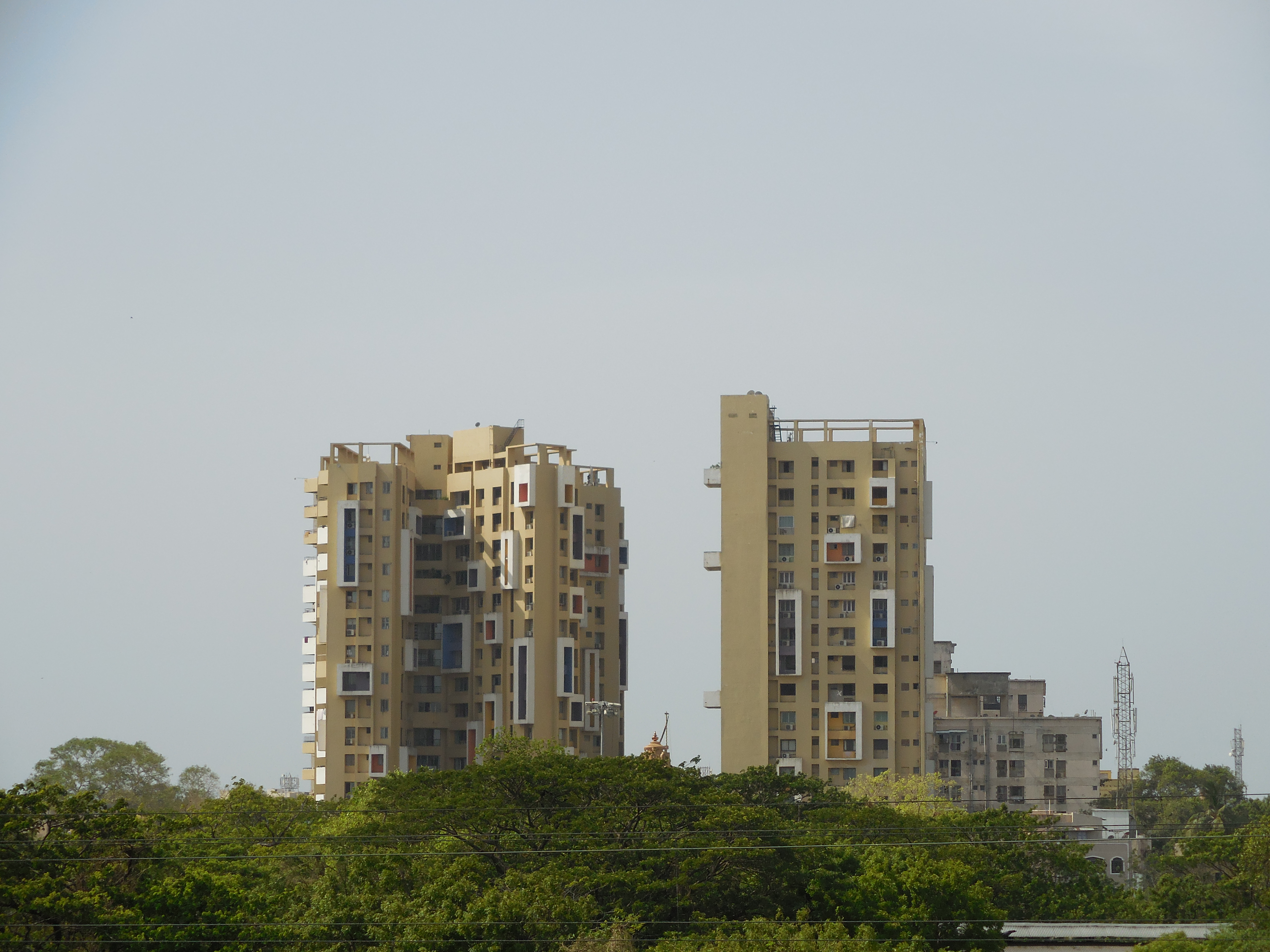
Osian Heights Towers, the tallest building in the neighbourhood, as seen from the Washermanpet railway lines

A half-a-century-old timber market functions along the North Wall Road near the Old Jail Road, where some shops deal with wood brought from the Andaman Islands. The government, however, is planning to shift the market to an alternative location due to road expansion projects. The Marakkadai area got its name from the timber market.

The place where the Seven Wells (known locally as 'Yezhu Kinaru') pumping station that supplied water to the city including Fort St. George was located now houses the workshop and stores of the Public Works Department. However, one of the old wells still supplies water to the Fort. The road also houses the Mint Clock Tower, one of the four freestanding clock towers in the city, which is located at the Mint Junction.

A flyover was inaugurated in 2014 at the Mint Junction on the Old Jail Road, connecting it with the Basin Bridge Road, where the Mint Street joins the road. The junction witnesses about 100,000 vehicles a day. This is the first intersection in George Town to get a flyover. The four-laned flyover measures 520 metres in length and 15 metres in width and is built at a cost of ₹ 230 million.

The western part of the stretch, the Basin Bridge Road, houses the 18-storied Osian Heights, the tallest residential building in George Town.

== See also ==
- George Town
- History of Chennai

== Bibliography ==
- Muthiah, S. (1981). Madras Discovered. Chennai: East West Books (Madras) Pvt Ltd.
