= Parasuramalingeswarar Temple =

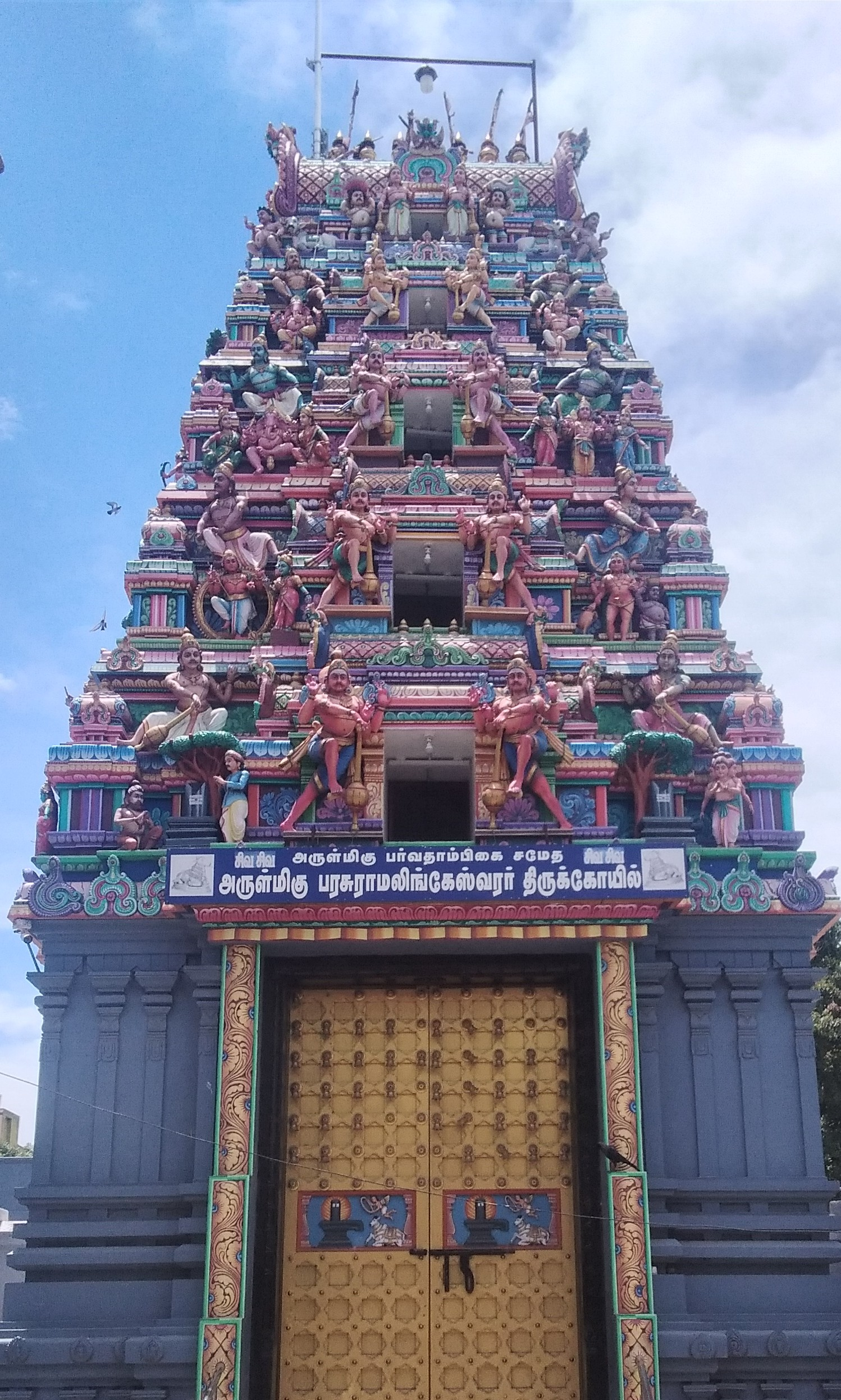
- Shri Parasuramalingeswarar Temple @ Ayanavaram

- Parasuramalingeswarar Temple (Chennai) Parasuramalingeswarar Temple (Tamil Nadu) Parasuramalingeswarar Temple (India)

Religion
- Affiliation: Hinduism
- District: Chennai
- Deity: Lord (Shiva)

Location
- Location: Chennai
- State: Tamil Nadu
- Country: India
- Interactive map of Parasuramalingeswarar Temple
- Coordinates: 13°05′51.5″N 80°13′32.3″E

Architecture
- Elevation: 35 m (115 ft)

Parasuramalingeswarar Temple is a Hindu temple situated in the neighbourhood of Ayanavaram in Chennai, India. The presiding deity is Shiva as Parasuramalingeswarar and the goddess is Parvathi as Parvathambigai. The main idol is in the form of a linga.

== Location ==
Located at an altitude of about 35 m above the mean sea level, the geographical coordinates of Parasuramalingeswarar temple are 13°05'51.5"N 80°13'32.3"E (i.e. 13.097630°N 80.225650°E).

== Gallery ==
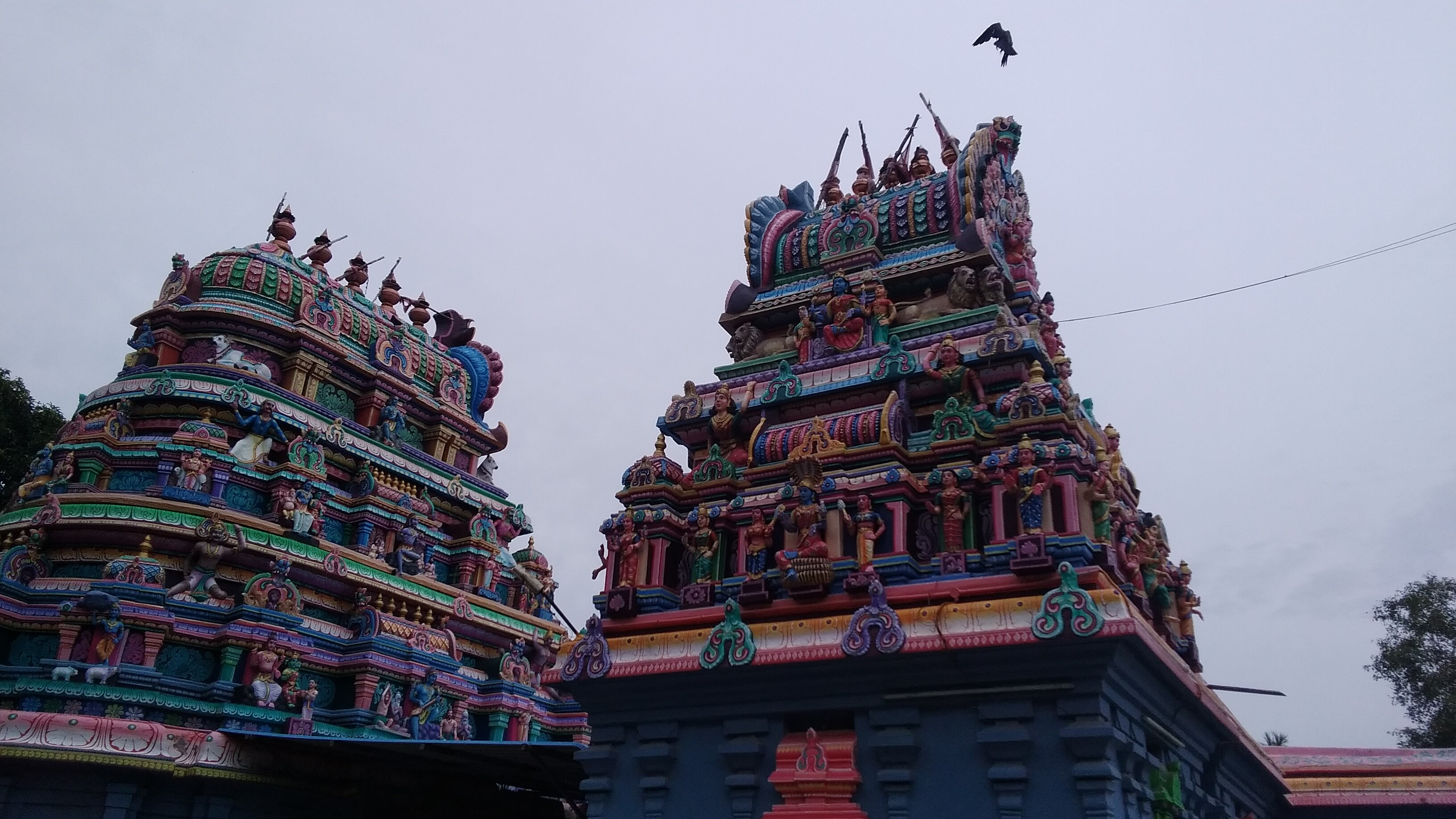
@ Parasuramalingeswarar Temple, Ayanavaram

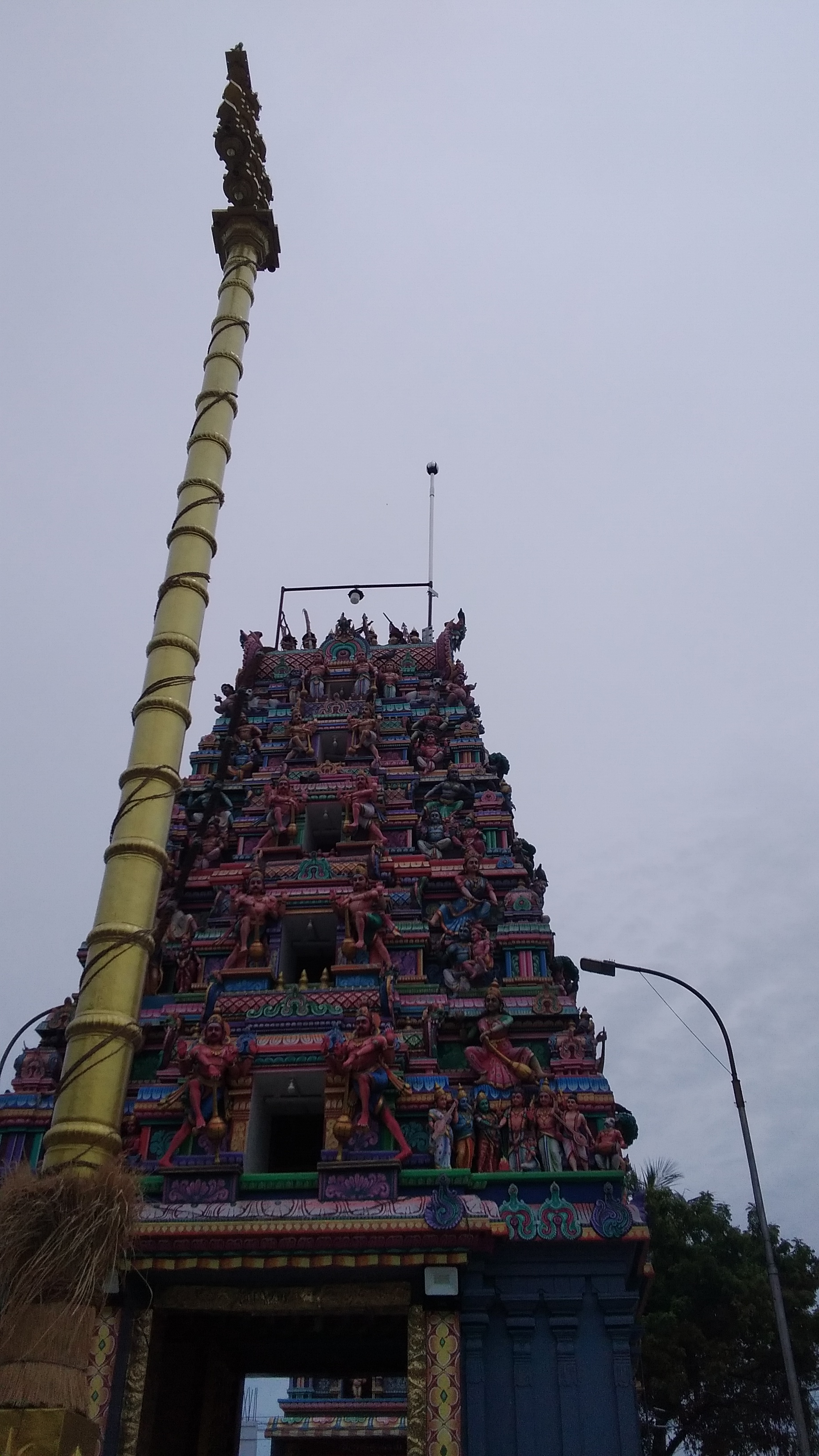
at Parasuramalingeswarar Temple, Ayanavaram

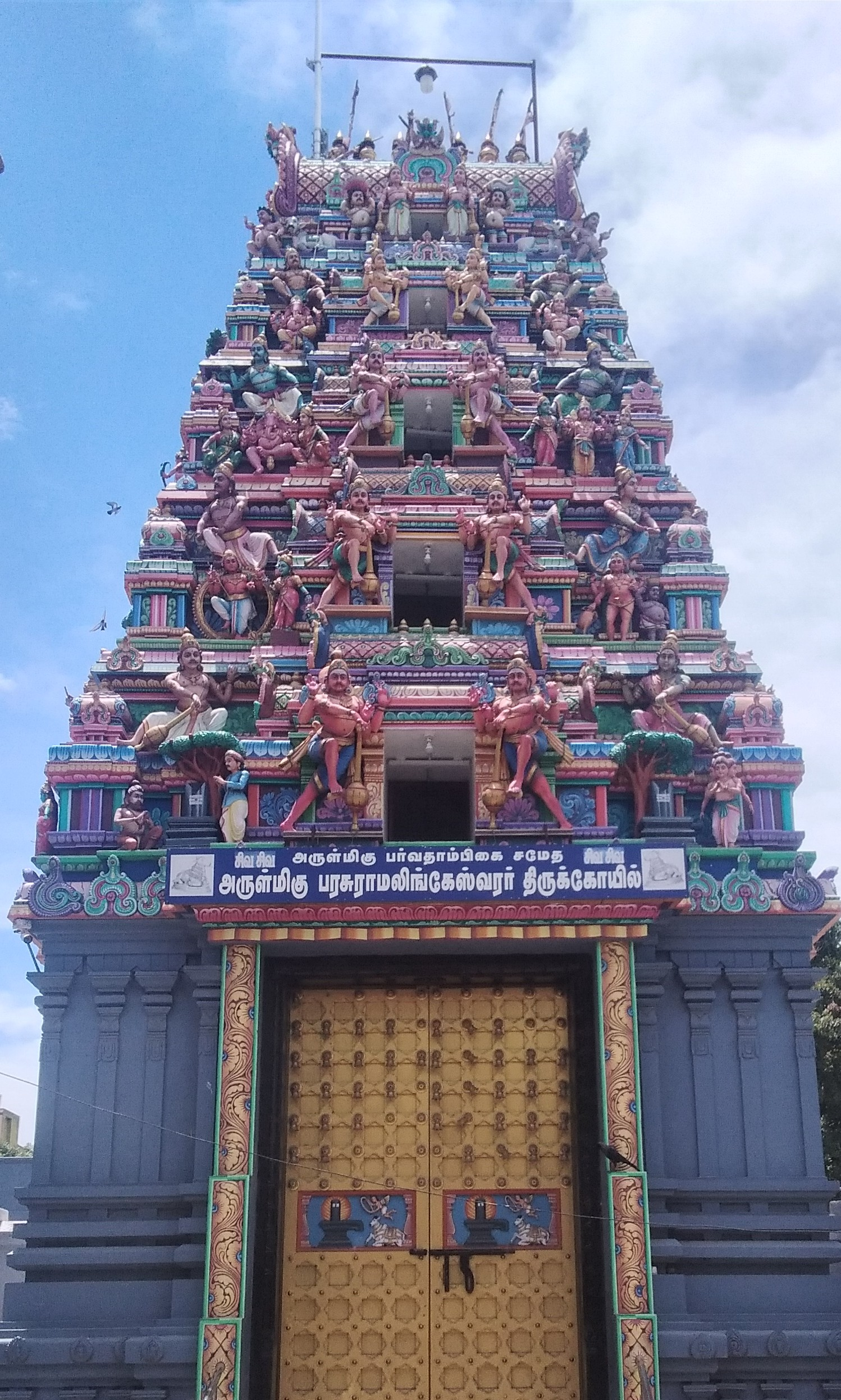
Shri Parasuramalingeswarar Temple @ Ayanavaram

== See also ==
- Religion in Chennai
