= Jagannath Temple, Chennai =

Jagannath Temple
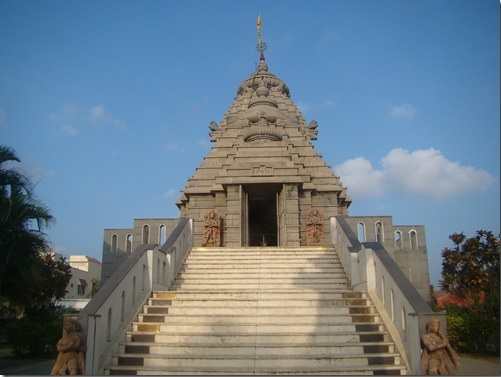

- Location in Chennai

Religion
- Affiliation: Hinduism
- District: Chennai
- Deity: Jagannath, Balabhadra and Subhadra
- Festival: Ratha Yatra

Location
- Location: Reddy Kuppam Road, Kannathur, off East Coast Road, Chennai
- State: Tamil Nadu
- Country: India
- Coordinates: 12.8502325°N 80.2435036°E

Architecture
- Type: Kalinga architecture
- Completed: 2001

Website
- jagannathshrinechennai.com

Jagannath Temple is a Hindu temple dedicated in Chennai, Tamil Nadu, India. The temple is dedicated to the divine trinity Jagannath, Baladeva and Subhadra. It is located in Kannathur off the East Coast Road on the Bay of Bengal coast. The temple is built in Kalinga architecture and the annual Rathyatra is the main festival celebrated in the temple.

== Architecture ==
The temple is built in Kalinga architecture similar to the Jagannath temple at Puri. There are 22 marble steps leading up to the main sanctum. The temple was consecrated on 26 January 2001. The temple is built of black granite sourced from Kancheepuram and marble from Rajasthan with landscaping around the temple complex. There is a large Dhvajastambha (flag pole) at the main entrance to the temple. The walls and ceilings are painted with frescoes including the depictions of the ten incarnations of Vishnu. Various flowers are grown in the garden which are used for the pooja, which is conducted by priests from Odisha.

== Deities ==
The temple is dedicated to the divine trinity Jagannath, Baladeva and Subhadra. The idols of the main deities are made of neem wood, similar to those at the Puri shrine. There are other smaller shrines dedicated to Hindu gods Yoganarasimha, Shiva, Ganesha, Gajalakshmi, Bimala, and Navagraha.

== Festivals ==
The most important festival at the shrine is the rath yatra, which is celebrated on the same day as in Puri. The primary deities are taken around the village during the occasion on a steel ratha, decorated with wood, cloth and flowers.

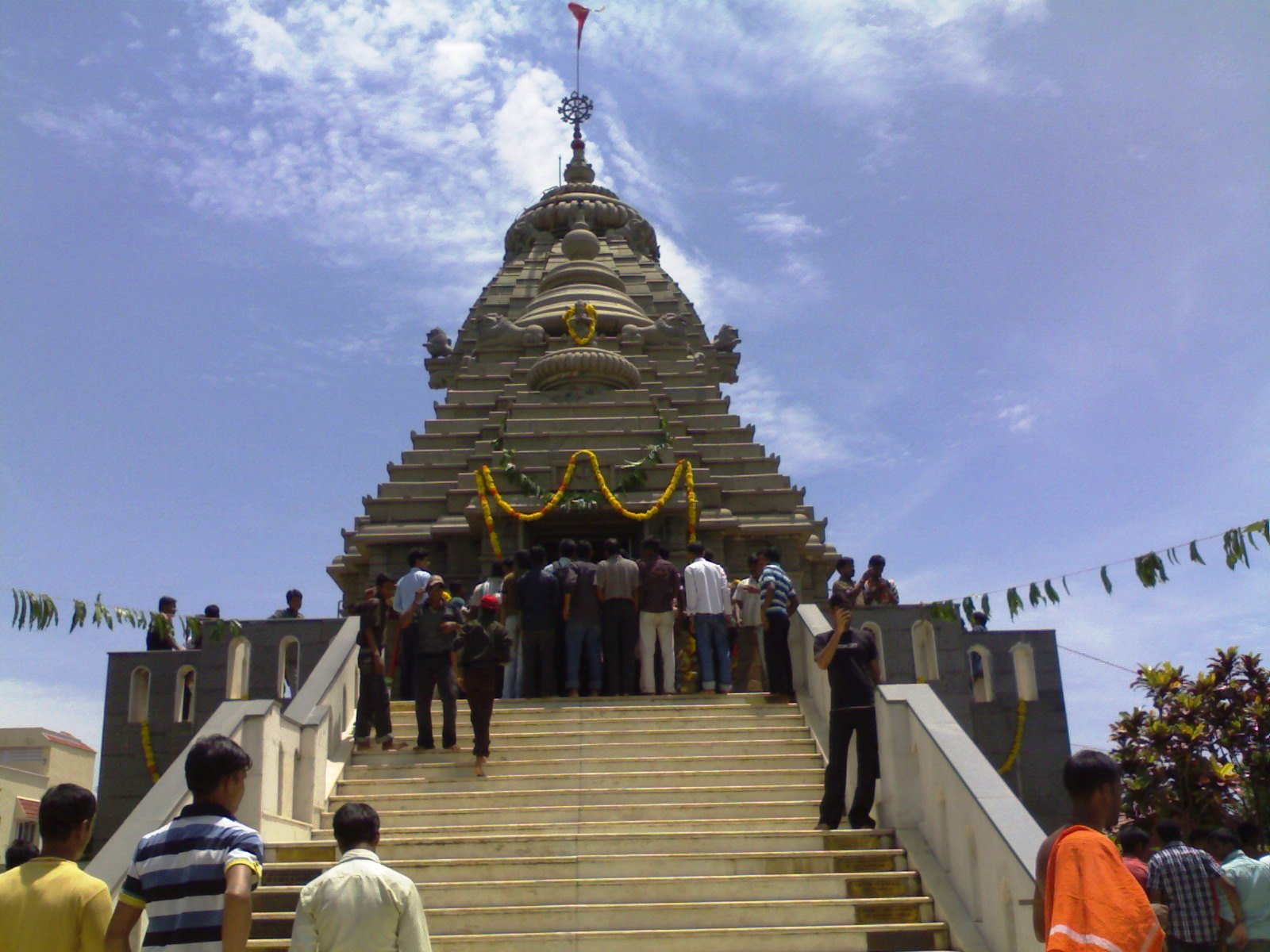
Sanctum sanctorum

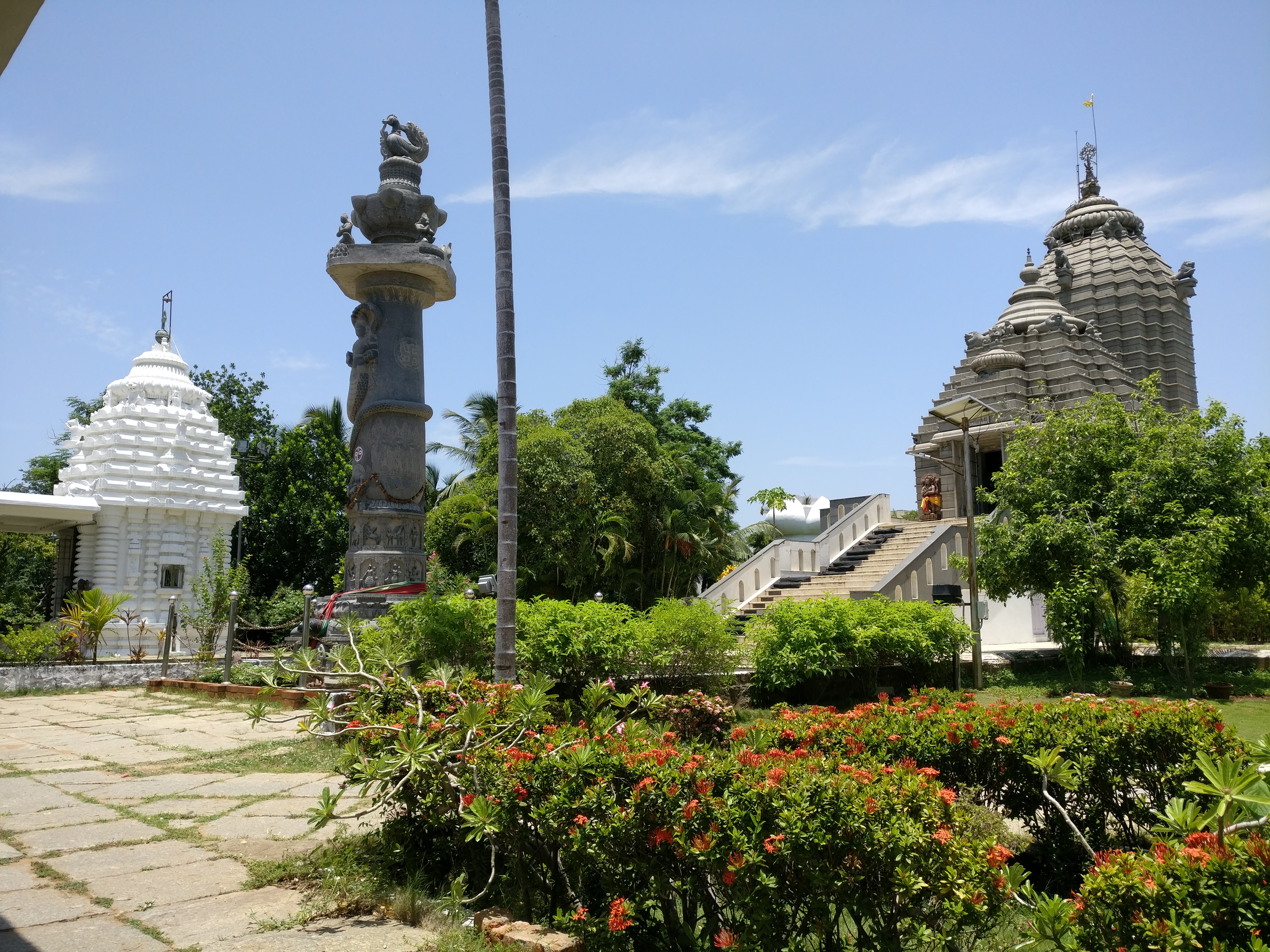
Side view

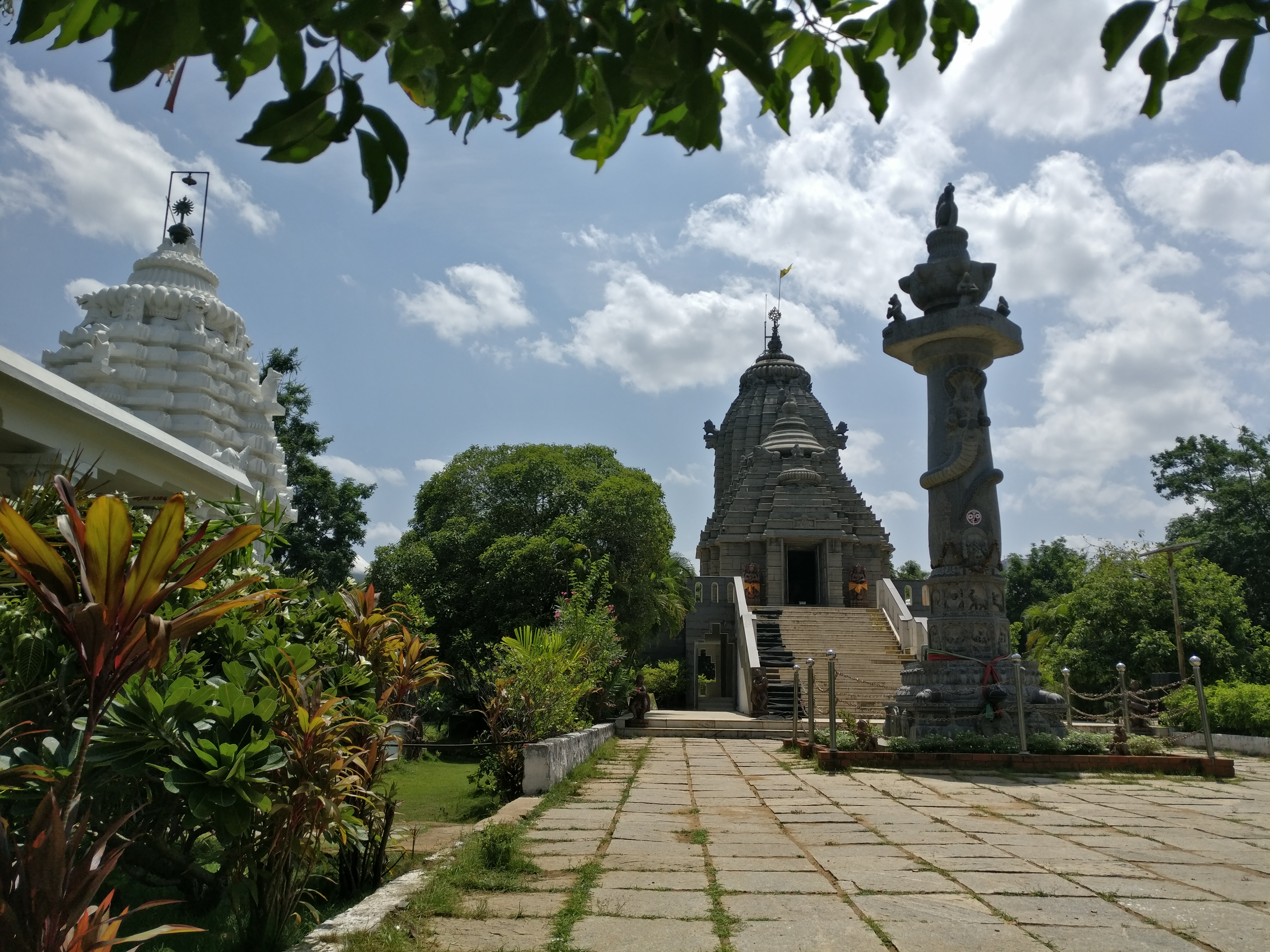
Front view

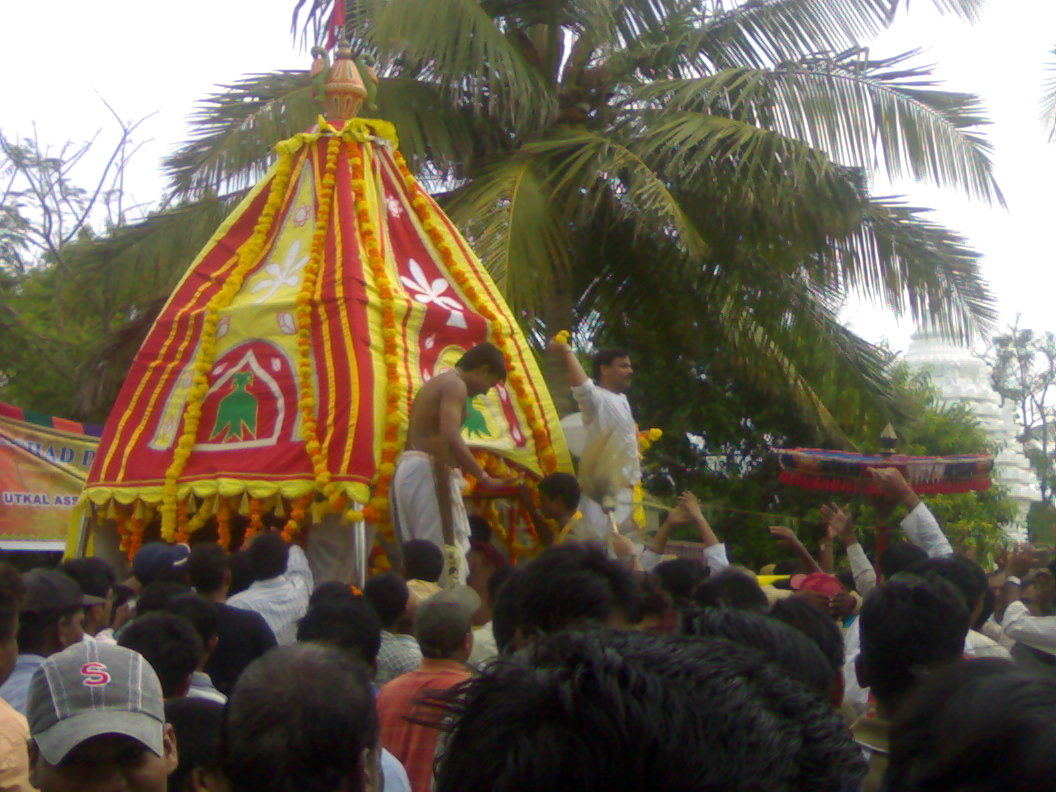
Rath Yatra

== See also ==
- Religion in Chennai
