= Kanathur (Chennai) =

Neighbourhood of Chennai, India

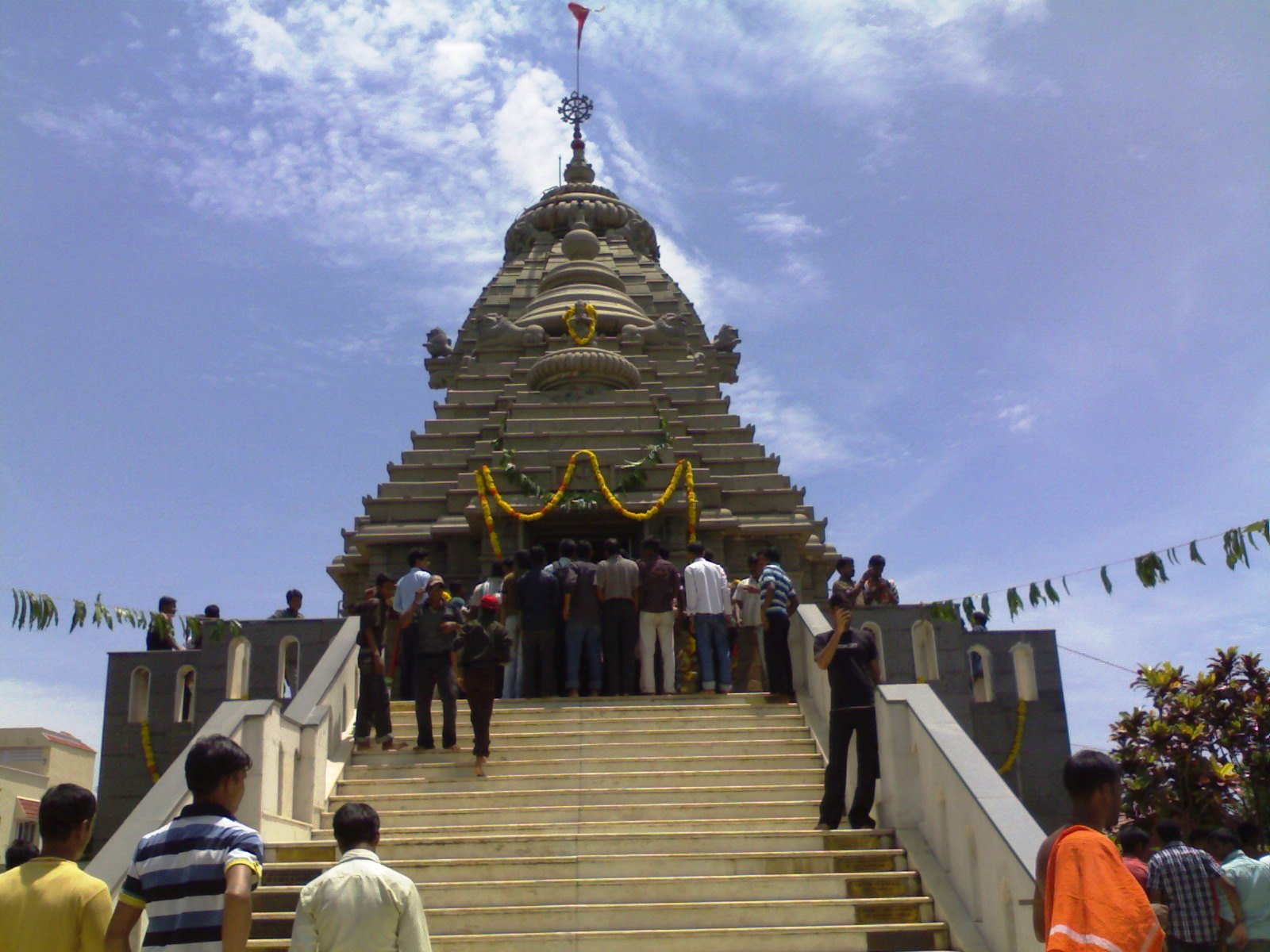
The neighbourhood is known for its Jagannath Temple

Kanathur, also spelled Kannathur, is a southern neighbourhood of Chennai, Tamil Nadu, India. It is located on the East Coast Road connecting Chennai and Pondicherry. The postal index code of the neighbourhood is 603112.

The neighbourhood is known for the Jagannath Temple built in 2001 and its annual ratha yathra (chariot procession).

== See also ==
- Neighbourhoods of Chennai
