= Smith Road, Chennai =

Road in Chennai, India

Smith Road in Chennai, Tamil Nadu, India branches off from Anna Salai, Chennai's arterial road near Spencer Plaza from the TVS Junction to join Whites Road near Hobart Muslim Girls Higher Secondary School.

Major companies and organizations located at this road includes

- TVS Motors
- Data Software Research Company
