= Vellala Street =

Vellala Street Vellalar Street
- Neighbourhood
- Location within Chennai
- Coordinates: 13.0835451°N 80.25144439°E
- Country: India
- State: Tamil Nadu
- District: Chennai
- Metro: Chennai
- Area: Purasawalkam

Government
  - Body: Chennai Corporation

Languages
  - Official: Tamil
- Time zone: UTC+5:30 (IST)
- Postal code: 600084
- Planning agency: CMDA
- Civic agency: Chennai Corporation
- Website: www.chennai.tn.nic.in

Vellala Street, also known as Vellalar Street, is a residential street in Purasawalkam in Chennai in the state of Tamil Nadu, India. Vellalar is supposedly a caste name crediting to the early residents who belonged to this caste. Later these distinctions vanished and led way to more diverse residents. One of the leading figures of early literature in English R. K. Narayan and his youngest brother R. K. Laxman, an Indian cartoonist, illustrator, and humorist were living at Number 1, Vellala Street.

== Landmarks ==
Vellala Street in Purasawalkam transitioned from a bylane to a one-way street. The Srinivasa Perumal Temple is a notable landmark in the area.

== Places of Worship ==
Two noticeable temple are located in this street. Karpaga Vinayagar Temple and Srinivasa Perumal Temple

== Educational institutions ==
Meena Typing Institute

== Schools ==
Corporation School

== Shopping ==
Regular department stores, Muthu Pharmacy
