= Monegar Choultry =

Monegar Choultry is a choultry in the city of Chennai, India. It is considered to be the first organised charity in Madras city.

== History ==
In the 18th century, there were constant wars between the British and the Nawabs of Mysore, resulting in destruction of property and lives and eventually a famine in Madras. In 1782, a village headman, locally known as a 'maniakarar', established a gruel centre in his garden in Royapuram off Broadway. Soon after the war, the centre became a choultry for the sick and poor people. During the 1782 Anglo-Mysore War, the government ordered that all buildings within a proximity of the Black Town Wall be destroyed. However, the choultry was exempted from this order. In 1807, the government made a substantial donation as more people started coming to the choultry. The Nawab of Arcot also donated a huge sum to the choultry.

A hospital was constructed within the premises of the choultry in 1799 by John Underwood, an assistant surgeon with the company. In 1801, the hospital was combined with the 'Native Hospital and Poor Fund' in the choultry. The building was rented by the Famine Relief Committee which conducted a charity for the 'sick and the poor' along with St. Mary's Church. The Government of Madras took over the affairs of the choultry from the Committee in 1808. The Native Hospital and the choultry's land were taken over by the government in 1910 and was renamed Royapuram Hospital, while the choultry was shifted to the premises of the nearby Rajah of Venkatagiri Choultry where additional rooms were built. The hospital later become the Stanley Hospital.

According to records published in the book The First Native Voice of Madras, released by author B. Jagannath, Sidloo Chetty and his son Gazulu Lakshminarasu Chetty were native board members along with Captain Christopher Biden, European member, in 1848.

== Etymology ==
Originally, the choultry did not have any name of its own. It was given the unofficial name "Monegar Choultry" the anglicised version of the term "Manyamkarar" (village headman) who ran a gruel centre nearby.

== The choultry today ==
The choultry functions today as an asylum for elderly people. The Collector of Madras remains the chairman of the choultry's managing committee. There is an ancient temple at the base of an old tree within the premises, dedicated to the Hindu deity Periya Palayathu Amman.

A rule still remains with the choultry that in case of the death of an inmate, the corpse will be sent to the Anatomy Department of the Stanley Medical College for study, rather than handing over to the relatives.
