= Otteri Nullah =

East–west waterway through north Chennai

Coordinates: 13.09398°N 80.21060°E

The Otteri Nullah is an east–west waterway which runs through north Chennai, starting in western Anna Nagar proceeding through Purasawalkam and then passing through Buckingham and Carnatic Mills before meeting the Buckingham Canal at Basin Bridge.

The waterway is around 10 km in length with a catchment area of 38.40 square kilometres. It is the major outlet for rainwater in North Chennai. Along with the other major waterways of Chennai, the water remains heavily polluted in spite of many government efforts to clean it up over the years, including the relocation of many thousands of people from its banks since the year 2000.

Heavy rains in late 2005 caused the stream to flood, leading to extensive inundation into the surrounding areas of polluted water and a subsequent outbreak of diarrhoea and vomiting. In the wake of the floods, the local administration began investigations into widening the stream to prevent recurrence of such problems in the future.

In 2010, it was announced that Hydrological digital instruments would be installed along the Otteri Nullah to monitor rainfall.

In 2011, the Public Works Department announced that it had started work on desilting the water body.
