= Kilpauk =

Neighborhood in Chennai, India

- Neighbourhood
- Location within Chennai Location within Tamil Nadu Location within India
- Coordinates: 13.0856°N 80.2379°E
- Country: India
- State: Tamil Nadu
- District: Chennai District
- Metro: Chennai

Government
  - Body: Chennai Corporation

Languages
  - Official: Tamil
- Time zone: UTC+5:30 (IST)
- PIN: 600010
- Vehicle registration: TN-01
- Planning agency: CMDA
- Civic agency: Chennai Corporation
- Website: www.chennai.tn.nic.in

Kilpauk is a semi residential area located in Chennai, Tamil Nadu, India. The distance from Chennai's city to Kilpauk is about 6 km. The region is situated off the Poonamallee High Road in the west. Adjacent areas of Kilpauk include Chetpet, Kellys, Egmore, Ayanavaram, Anna Nagar, Choolaimedu and Purasawalkam.

The nearest railway station for Kilpauk is the one at Chetpet. This railway station lies to the south of Kilpauk and not more than a kilometre away. There are two metro stations which connects to Kilpauk, they are Nehru Park and Kilpauk (entrance of the Kilpauk Medical College). The Chennai Airport is about 18 km from Kilpauk.

This place was a cantonment area for British troops before India's independence. Today this locality is known as "Little Korea" due to the Korean population residing in this area.

The neighbourhood has a historical water-treatment plant. On the other end, to the west, is the Institute of Mental Health, one of the oldest mental asyla in the continent, visited by Elizabeth II.

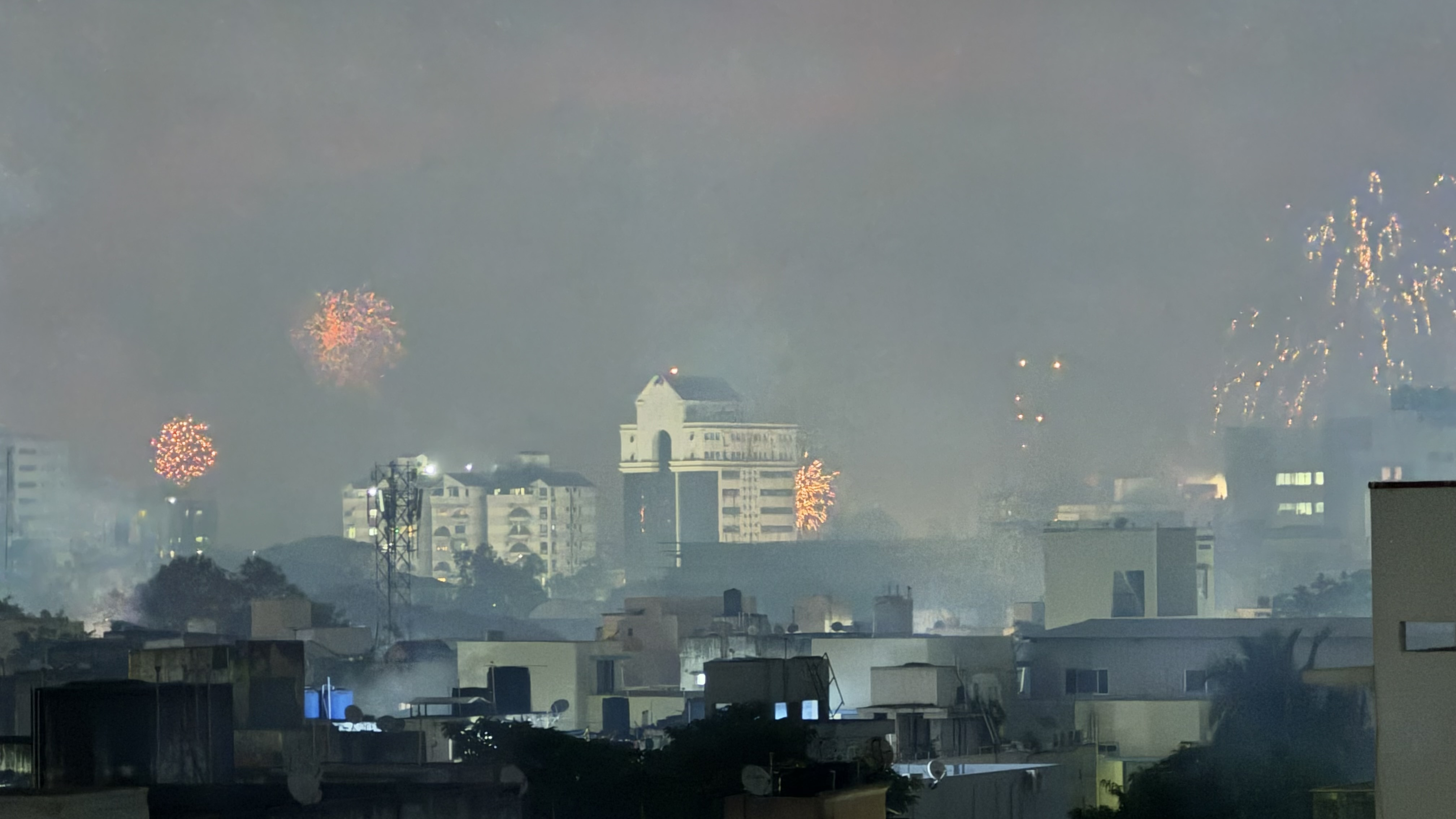
The Ega Tower on Diwali (October 31) 2024.

== Localities ==
- Kilpauk Garden
- Kelly's Corner
- Aspiran Garden
- Secretariat Colony

== Educational Institutions ==
- Seth P D Hinduja Sindhi Model Senior Secondary School
- C S I Bain school
- Bhavan's Rajaji Vidyashram
- Chinmaya Vidyalaya
- Kola Saraswati
- Hindustan Institute of Maritime Training
- MES Razeena Matriculation Higher Secondary School

Both the Directorate of Medical Education and Government Kilpauk Medical College are located on EVR Periyar Salai. Kilpauk is also well known for engineering college head offices, including Rajalakshmi Institutions and Sree Sastha Institute of Engineering and Technology.

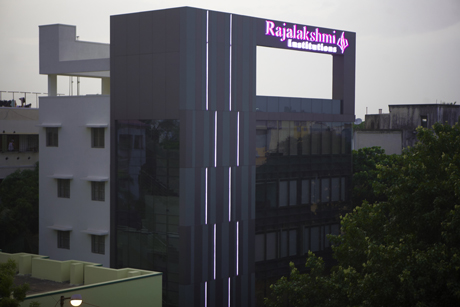
Rajalakshmi Institutions Main Office

== Religious Places ==
=== Temple ===
There is an Amman temple viz., Pathala Ponniamman Temple located at Kilpauk. This temple is maintained under the control of Hindu Religious and Charitable Endowments Department, Government of Tamil Nadu.

== See also ==
Kilpauk Medical College
