= Ayanavaram Kariyamanikka Perumal Temple =

- Kariyamanikka Perumal temple, Ayanavaram, Chennai, Tamil Nadu

Religion
- Affiliation: Hinduism
- District: Chennai district
- Deity: Kariyamanikka Perumal

Location
- Location: Ayanavaram
- State: Tamil Nadu
- Country: India
- Interactive map of Ayanavaram Kariyamanikka Perumal Temple
- Coordinates: 13.097330°N 80.225870°E

Architecture
- Elevation: 59 m (194 ft)

Kariyamanikka Perumal Temple is a Hindu temple located in Ayanavaram neighborhood in Chennai district of Tamil Nadu State in the peninsular India.

Kariyamanikka Perumal Temple is situated at an altitude of 59 m above the mean sea level with the geographical coordinates of 13.097330°N 80.225870°E.

Kariyamanikka Perumal temple is under the control of the Hindu Religious and Charitable Endowments Department, Government of Tamil Nadu.
