= Employees State Insurance Scheme Hospital, Ayanavaram =

- Location within Tamil Nadu

Geography
- Location: Ayanavaram, Chennai, Tamil Nadu, India
- Coordinates: 13.0949°N 80.2391°E

Organisation
- Care system: General
- Type: Full service medical center

Employees' State Insurance Scheme Hospital, Ayanavaram (ESIS Hospital) is a government-run hospital in Ayanavaram, a neighbourhood of Chennai, in the state of Tamil Nadu, India. Employees with a monthly salary less than ₹15,000 are eligible for treatments in ESIS Hospitals.

It is one of the two Employees' State Insurance Scheme hospitals in Chennai, the other being located at K. K. Nagar.

== Location ==
It is situated at an altitude of about 31.8 metres (104 ft) above the mean sea level with the geographic coordinates of (13.0949°N 80.2391°E) on Medavakkam Tank road in Ayanavaram.

== Details ==
Various treatments related to Cardiology, Nephrology, Gynaecology, Orthopaedics, ENT, Ophthalmology, Physiotherapy and Surgery are provided in this hospital. Separate blood bank facility adds the specialities. Medicine department occupies the ground floor. Out-patient department with specific timings is operated. Dental treatment facilities are also available here.
