= Selavayal =

- Neighbourhood
- Selavayal (Chennai) Selavayal (Tamil Nadu) Selavayal (India)
- Coordinates: 13.1442°N 80.2556°E
- Country: India
- State: Tamil Nadu
- District: Chennai
- Metro: Chennai
- Elevation: 25.98 m (85.2 ft)

Language
  - Official: Tamil
- Time zone: UTC+5:30 (IST)
- PIN: 600051
- Telephone code: +9144********
- Vehicle registration: TN 05 ** xxxx (RTO, Chennai North)
- Planning agency: CMDA
- City: Chennai
- Lok Sabha constituency: Chennai North
- Vidhan Sabha constituency: Perambur
- Civic agency: Chennai Corporation

Selavayal (Tamil: சேலைவாயல்) is a residential locality in the northern part of the metropolitan city of Chennai, Tamil Nadu state, India.

== Location ==
Selavayal is located near Madhavaram Milk Colony, Chennai Magic Nursery Garden Sri Durgai Avenue, KKD Nagar, Kodungaiyur, MKB Nagar, and Manali.

== Education ==
There is an educational institution viz., Thiruthangal Nadar College started as a self-financing college for Arts and Science College for Men and upgraded as a coeducational college in 2002, which is affiliated to madras University is situated in Selavayal area.
