= Kadaperi =

Neighborhood in Chennai, India

Kadaperi is a neighbourhood in Chennai, India next to Tambaram. With a population of around 2000 people, Kadaperi is close to the Madras Export Processing Zone, which is the first Special Economic Zone in Chennai. Pachai Malai grassland and lakes are present in the area.

The area is one of the 163 notified areas (megalithic sites) in the state of Tamil Nadu.

== Etymology ==
The name comes from Kada (in Tamil), meaning door or gateway and eri meaning lake. Thus, it comes to mean the "gateway lake" in Chennai.

== Transport links ==
Tambaram Sanatorium Railway station, a bus station and an Air Force station are close by. It is just 1 kilometre (0.62 mi) away from the Tambaram Bus Stand and Railway Station. Kadaperi is a junction for most of the buses from the city to the rest of Tamil Nadu.
