= Dorothy Doveton =

English-South African geographer (1913-1992)

Dorothy Mary Doveton MBE (1913–1992) was an English-South African geographer who published on the human geography of Eswatini (then called Swaziland). She was also recognised for her social welfare and cultural services in Zimbabwe.

Doveton was born in 1913 in South Africa to mining engineer Douglas Hodson Doveton. When her father died in 1920, her mother Agnes moved the family back to England and remarried. Doveton attended Godolphin School.

Doveton passed the preliminary examination in natural sciences at St Hugh's College, Oxford in 1932. She won the Hurry Prize from St Hugh's College in 1934 and was the president of its JCR. In 1934 she was the first person to gain a First Class pass from the Honour School of Geography.

She received the first Drapers' Company scholarship, which she used to study the human geography of Swaziland for her BLitt. She published several articles on aspects of Swaziland's human geography and a monograph published by the Institute of British Geographers in 1937.

In the 1940s, Doveton moved to Bulawayo, Zimbabwe. She married surveyor Cecil Dicey and, after his death, John Fleming. She served as a representative of the National Federation of Women's Institutes of Zimbabwe, an Executive Member of the National History Society, and a board member of the National Free Library of Bulawayo. In 1961 she received an MBE for 'social welfare and cultural services in the South Western part of Southern Rhodesia'. St Hugh's College had a society for geographers named after her until 2005.
