= Thamaaraipakkam =

Village in Tamil Nadu, India

Coordinates: 12°45′41.97″N 79°18′30.63″E

Thamaraipakkam is a village in Arcot Taluk of Ranipet district in the state of Tamil Nadu, India.
