= Broadway, Chennai =

Street in Chennai, India

Broadway
- Prakasam Road
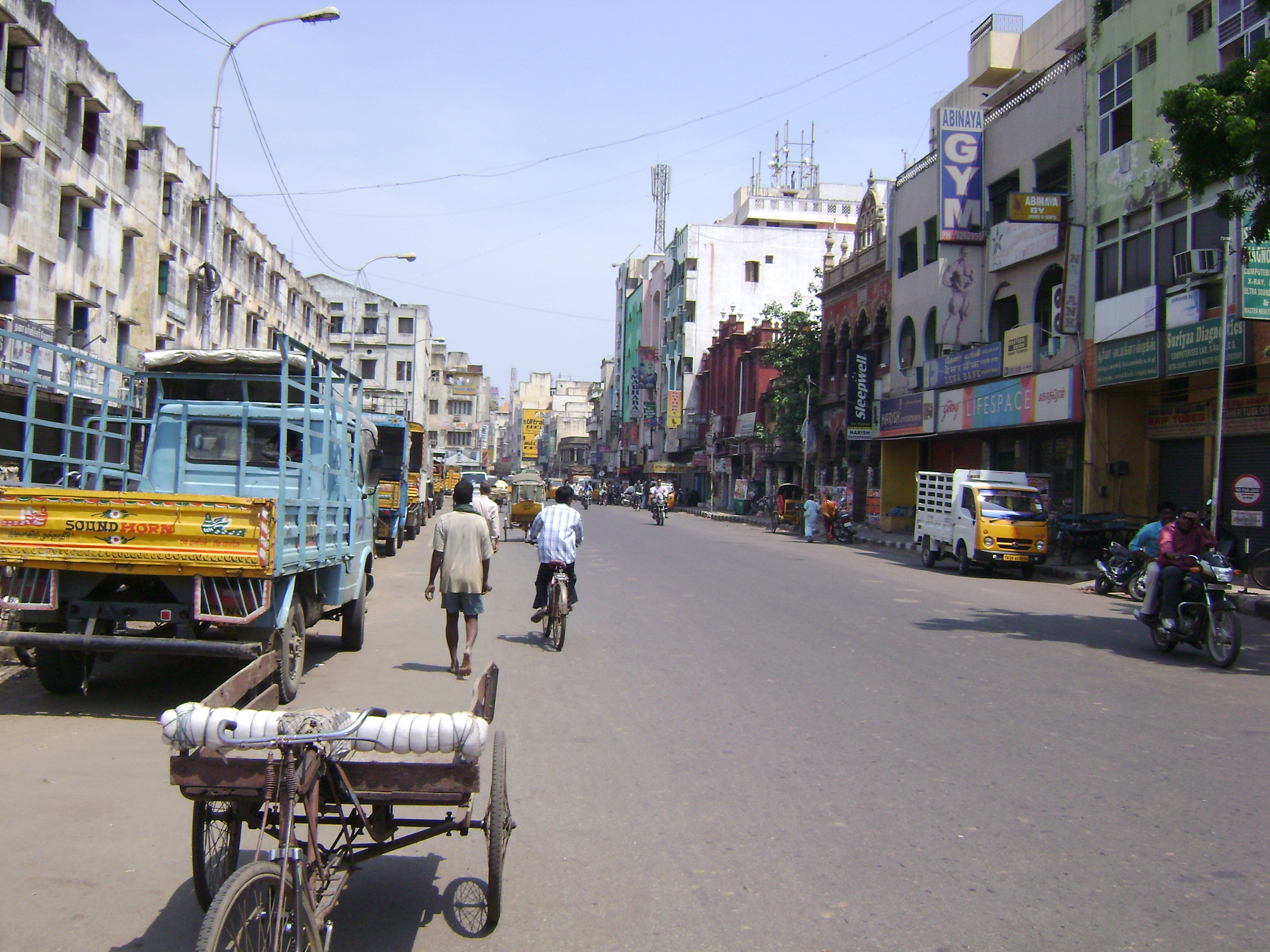
- A section of the street in 2007
- Interactive map of Broadway
- Maintained by: Corporation of Chennai
- Length: 1.05 mi (1.69 km)
- Coordinates: 13.09965°N 80.286613°E
- South end: China Bazaar Road, George Town, Chennai
- North end: Old Jail Road/Ibrahim Sahib Street, Chennai

Construction
- Inauguration: Late 18th century

Broadway (officially known as Prakasam Salai, after the freedom fighter T. Prakasam) is one of the historical thoroughfares of the commercial centre of George Town in Chennai, India. The road runs north–south connecting China Bazaar Road in the south with Ibrahim Sahib Street (Old Jail Road) in the north. The road divides George Town into Muthialpet and Peddanaickenpet.

== History ==
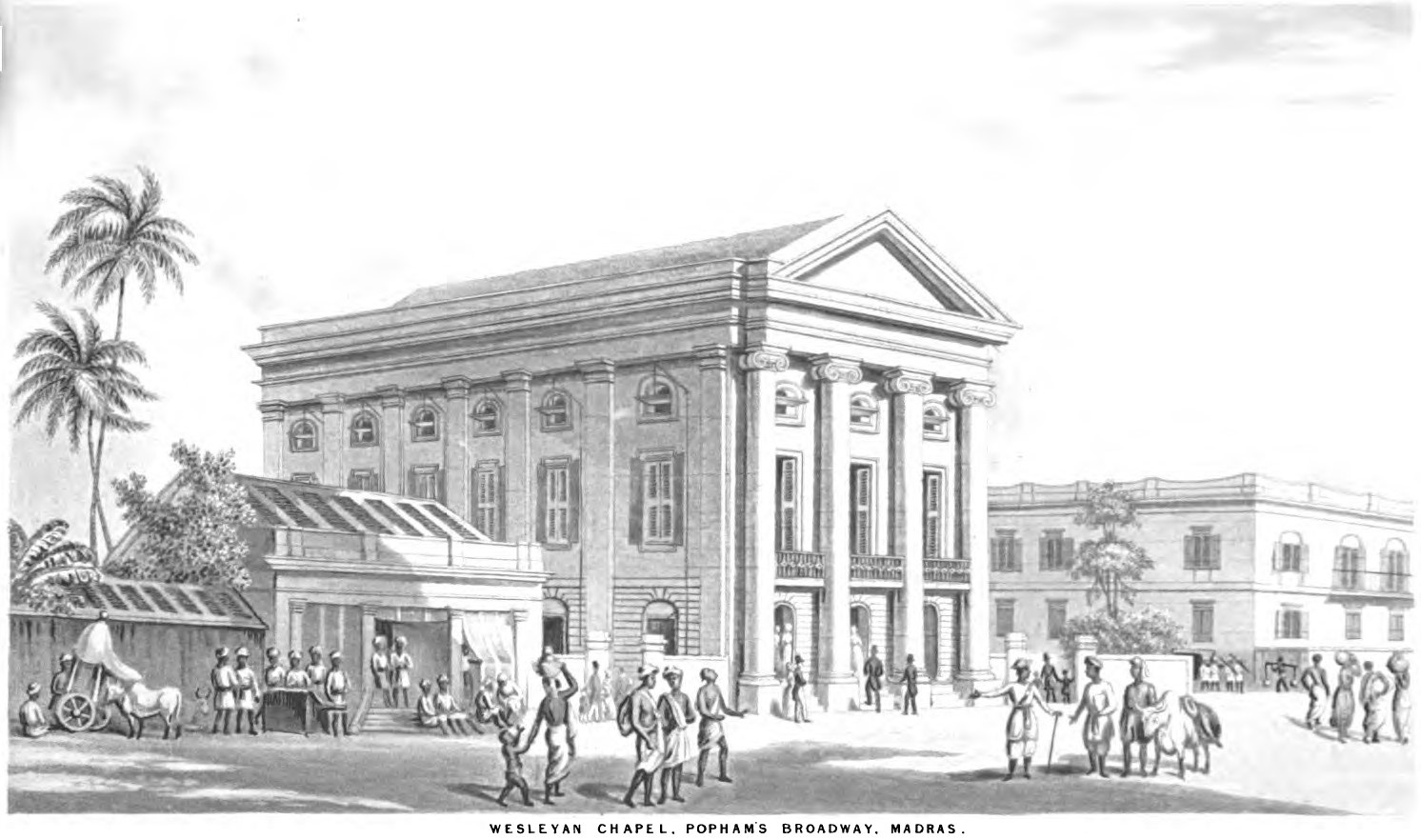
Wesleyan Chapel, Popham's Broadway, Madras (January 1848, p.1, V)

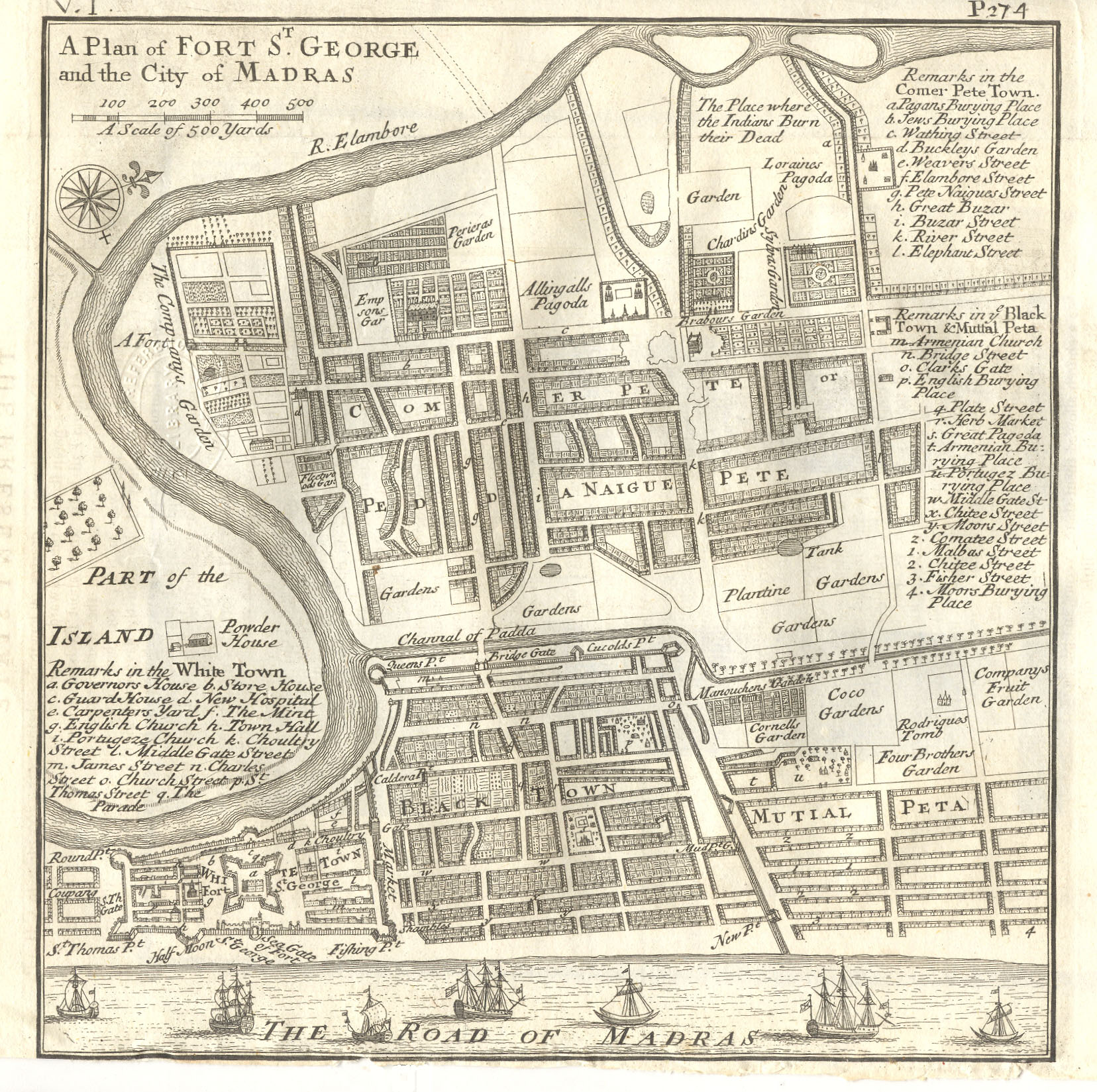
Plan of Fort St George and the city of Madras in 1726.

Up until the 16th century, the road and the surrounding region, being near the coast, had many sand ridges. As the sea level rose, it inundated these regions, where several lagoons and ridges were left behind when the sea withdrew. The sandy ridges remained places of safety, where settlements were established. Several valleys ran around the ridges, which rose up to about 12 feet in height. Some of these valleys served as drainage channels. Until the late 18th century, the area on which the present day's road lies remained one such unwanted drainage channel, known then as Atta Pallam. Much of the area was owned by Stephen Popham, a former British MP and later the advocate general in Calcutta, who moved to Madras in 1778. He is credited with establishing a modern police force in the city in 1782.

The area where the General Hospital, Madras United Club and the Park Town post office stand today was then a hill known locally as Narimedu (literally 'mound of foxes'), which was named 'Hoggs Hill' by the British. When the British considered it as a security threat to Fort St. George and decided to level the area, Popham negotiated with them to buy the earth removed from the hill to fill the ditch, and a road was laid on it in 1782. The thoroughfare thus created came to be known as 'Popham's Broadway'.

By the 1890s, the road became known for two food establishments, the first of which was that of P. Venkatachellum, whose condiments and chutneys were popular in England. He is credited with the creation of mulligatawny soup from the local recipe of milagu rasam (milagu thanni). The other restaurant was Harrison's, established in 1891, which today is a contemporary hotel in Nungambakkam.

The road was also home to the city's first private hospital run in the 1900s by physician T. A. Sankaranarayanan, decades before the advent of the Apollo Hospitals, the country's first modern corporate hospital, established in 1983.

== The present-day road ==
Today, the road has morphed into one of the most important commercial streets of George Town. Several commercial establishments, especially those of opticians, have their shops on this street. The Broadway bus terminus, the largest bus terminus of the Chennai Metropolitan Transport Corporation, is located on the southern end of the road.

The Mannadi Metro station serves the street and its surrounding areas.

== See also ==
- Parry's Corner
- George Town
- History of Chennai

== Bibliography ==
- Muthiah, S. (1981). Madras Discovered. East West Books (Madras) Pvt Ltd. p. 124.
