= Basin Bridge Junction railway station =

Railway station in Tamil Nadu, India

Basin Bridge Junction
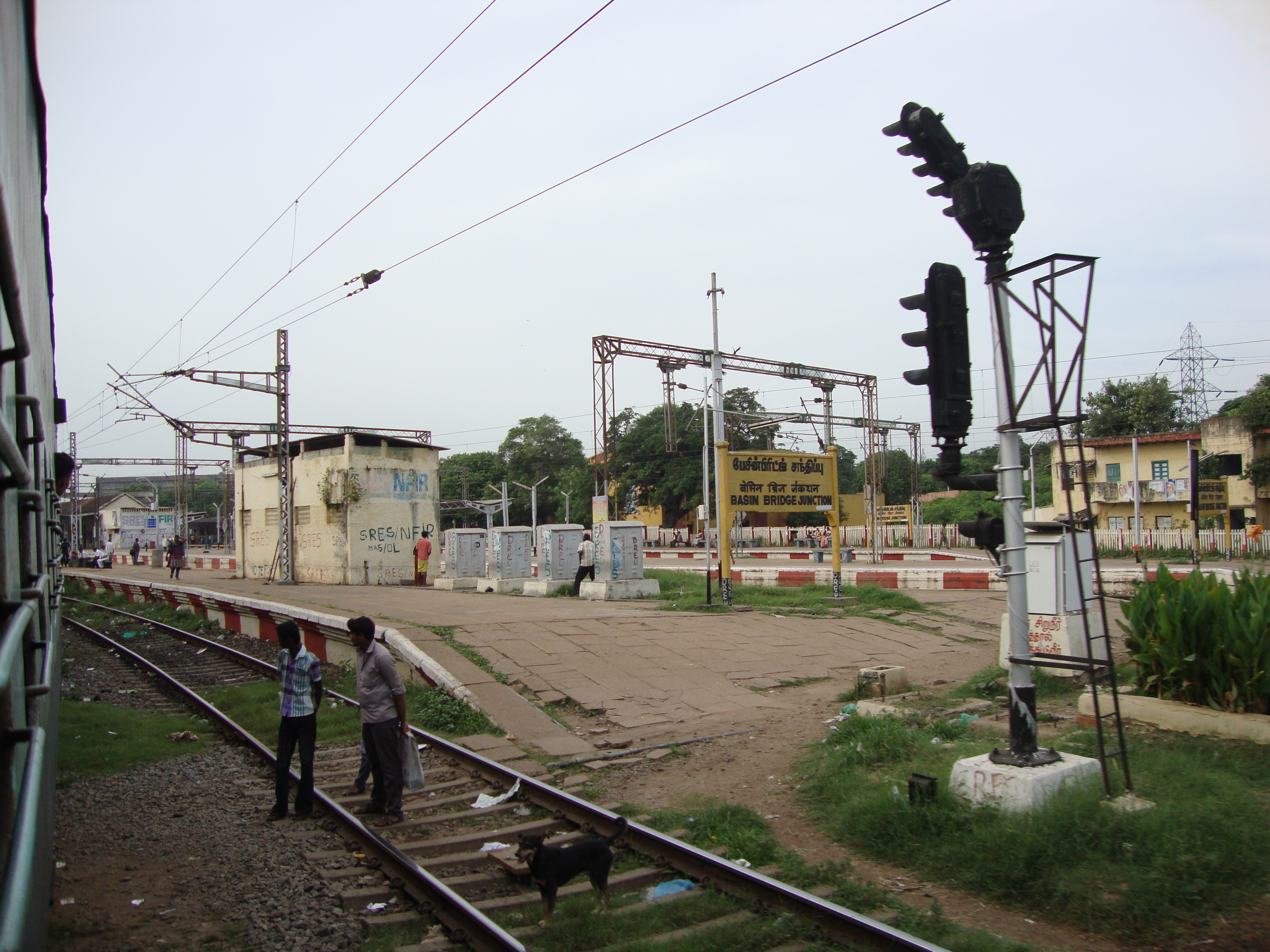
- View of Basin Bridge railway junction

General information
- Location: Pulianthope, Chennai, Tamil Nadu, India
- Coordinates: 13.10230°N 80.27143°E
- System: Indian Railways; Chennai Suburban Railway
- Owner: Ministry of Railways, Indian Railways
- Lines: Chennai–Bengaluru; Chennai–Howrah; Chennai–Mumbai; Chennai–New Delhi
- Platforms: 7
- Tracks: 8

Construction
- Structure type: Standard on-ground station
- Parking: Available

Other information
- Station code: BBQ
- Fare zone: Southern Railways

History
- Electrified: 13 April 1979
- Former names: South Indian Railway

Passengers
- 2013: 10,000/day
Location

Basin Bridge Junction is a railway station in Chennai, India. It comes under the purview of the Chennai railway division of the Southern Railway zone of the Indian Railways. It is the first station on the lines originating from Chennai Central, and as Central is a terminal station, the various lines branch out from the nearby Basin Bridge station. It is located at Pulianthope near the confluence on the Otteri Nullah and Buckingham Canal.

A coach maintenance depot and train care centre is located close to the station. It is the largest train care centre under the Southern Railway, and is equipped with 14 pit lines including two lines to accommodate 24-coach trains, and the rest designed to park 18-coach trains. It also has a trip shed for housing electric locomotives, located to the north of the train care centre.

The station is covered by an Integrated Security Surveillance System project implemented in 2012.
