= Whites Road, Chennai =

Road in Chennai, India

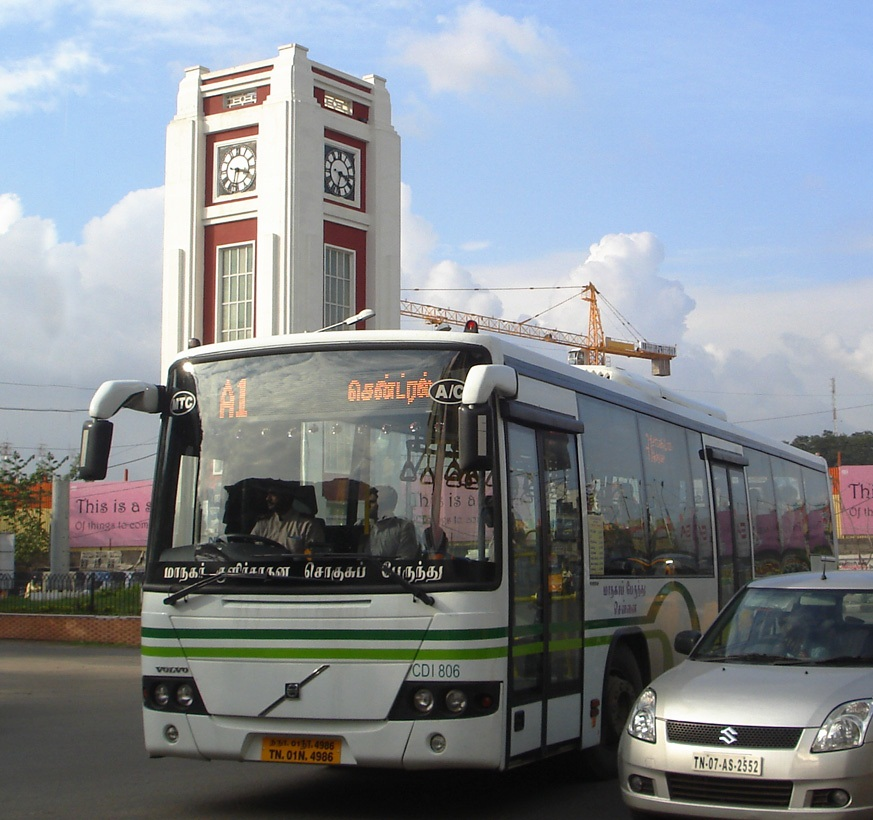
Royapettah Clock Tower

Whites Road in Chennai, Tamil Nadu, India branches off from Anna Salai, Chennai's arterial road near National Insurance Company after Thousand Lights Mosque and reaches up to Royapettah Clock Tower near Wesley Church. Chennai's famous Express Avenue shopping mall is located on this road.

Major institutions located at this road includes

- United India Insurance
- Corporation Bank
- Cognizant Technology Solutions
- Hobart Muslim Girls Higher Secondary School
- Wesley Higher Secondary School
