= Cenotaph Road =

Road in Teynampet in Chennai

Cenotaph Road is a famous road in Teynampet in Chennai, named for a cenotaph for Lord Cornwallis that was originally built on Mount Road, which was later moved.

Cenotaph Road is a key road in Chennai. Some important buildings and businesses include ICICI Bank, IMC Limited, port based storage and handling company and City Gas Distribution, TPL House (which houses Tamil Nadu Petroproducts Limited), Sasken Communication Technologies, Ernst & Young, etc.), the Russian Trade Embassy, and a Cafe Coffee Day. The corporate office of Arihant Foundations, a leading real estate company based in Chennai, is also located on Cenotaph Road.

Cenotaph road has a first and second street, first and second lanes, and another road named Chitharanajan road adjoining it. Kollywood actress Trisha Krishnan resides on 2nd lane while UB Group chairman Vijay Mallya has a house on 2nd lane. DMK party president and former chief minister of Tamil Nadu, M. K. Stalin, lives on Chitharanjan Road. In the first lane, Dr. K. P. Shamsuddeen, a leading cardiologist has a house. Sudha Ragunathan also resides at Cenetoph Road. Other famous people living in Cenatoph Road include dancer Anita Ratnam and pianist and musician Anil Srinivasan
