= Pulianthope =

- Neighbourhood
- Pulianthope (Chennai) Pulianthope (Tamil Nadu) Pulianthope (India)
- Coordinates: 13.098160°N 80.268320°E
- Country: India
- State: Tamil Nadu
- District: Chennai
- Metro: Chennai
- Elevation: 30 m (98 ft)

Languages
  - Official: Tamil
- Time zone: UTC+5:30 (IST)
- PIN: 600012
- Telephone code: +9144xxxxxxxx
- Planning agency: CMDA
- City: Chennai
- Civic agency: Greater Chennai Corporation
- Website: https://chennai.nic.in

Pulianthope is a neighbourhood in Chennai district of Indian state of Tamil Nadu. It was initially known as "Medicine Warehouse" for Englishmen, so it was called "Marunthukedangu" and now it has changed to Pulianthope. From the days of Englishmen this place was very developed area in North Chennai. Also, it was surrounded with "Binny Mills" which was the biggest garment export factory, Basin bridge railway station, Chennai's biggest cattle slaughter house and meat supplier hub called "Aadudhotti".

== Location ==
Pulianthope is located near Pattalam, Otteri and Choolai.
