= Pulianthoppu =

Neighbourhood in Thanjavur district, Tamil Nadu, India

- village
- Country: India
- State: Tamil Nadu
- District: Thanjavur
- Taluk: Thanjavur

Population (2001)
  - Total: 2,696

Languages
  - Official: Tamil
- Time zone: UTC+5:30 (IST)

Pulianthoppu is a village in the Thanjavur taluk of Thanjavur district, Tamil Nadu, India.

== Demographics ==
As per the 2001 census, Pulianthoppu had a total population of 2696 with 1373 males and 1323 females. The sex ratio was 964. The literacy rate was 86.43.
