= Pattalam, Chennai =

Pattalam
- Neighbourhood
- Pattalam (Chennai) Pattalam (Tamil Nadu) Pattalam (India)
- Coordinates: 13.100100°N 80.261500°E
- Country: India
- State: Tamil Nadu
- District: Chennai
- Metro: Chennai
- Elevation: 32 m (105 ft)

Languages
  - Official: Tamil
- Time zone: UTC+5:30 (IST)
- PIN: 600012
- Telephone code: 044xxxxxxxx
- Vehicle registration: TN 05 yy xxxx (RTO, Chennai North)
- Planning agency: CMDA
- City: Chennai
- Civic agency: Chennai Corporation
- Website: https://chennai.nic.in

Pattalam, is a developed residential area in Central Chennai, a metropolitan city in Tamil Nadu, India.

The area is famous for its Hanuman temple which occupies the center of the place; Ellaiamman Temple and Siddhi Buddhi Vinayagar cum Lakshmi Amman Temple, all the above mentioned three temples are under the control of Hindu Religious and Charitable Endowments Department, Government of Tamil Nadu.

It features the largest marketplace in North Chennai.

== Location ==
Pattalam is located near Purasawalkam, Pulianthope. A very close residence of Choolai getting connected along with the Perambur Barracks road. The landmark of this place is pattalam manikund ( clock tower), pensioners lane (old military quarters), old Indian army people's are lived there.
