= Ayanavaram =

Ayanavaram Ayanpuram
- Neighbourhood
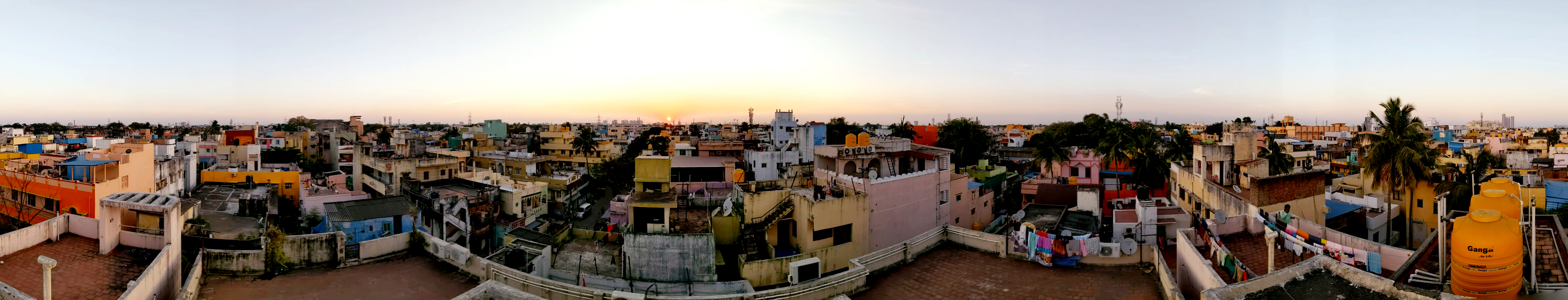
- Panorama of Ayanavaram near Vellala Street at Sunset

- Ayanavaram (Chennai) Ayanavaram (Tamil Nadu) Ayanavaram (India)
- Coordinates: 13°05′55.0″N 80°14′01.3″E
- Country: India
- State: Tamil Nadu
- District: Chennai
- Metro: Chennai

Government
  - Body: Greater Chennai Corporation
- Elevation: 55 m (180 ft)

Languages
  - Official: Tamil
- Time zone: UTC+5:30 (IST)
- PIN: 600023
- Vehicle registration: TN-01
- Planning agency: CMDA
- Civic agency: Greater Chennai Corporation
- Website: www.chennai.tn.nic.in

Ayanpuram or Ayanavaram is a neighbourhood in Chennai, India. Konnur High Road (Ayanavaram road), one of the important connecting roads in Chennai runs through Ayanavaram.

== Etymology ==
The neighbourhood was originally known as Ayanpuram, with Ayan meaning Brahma. When Lord Muruga admonished Brahma and took over creation, it is believed that Brahma prayed to Shiva here and got his action of creativity back. It is believed that Brahma worshipped Shiva at Parasurama Easwaran Koil. It is in recognition of that Ayanpuram is named. (It was also called Brahmapuri).

== Road transport ==
Main roads that pass through the neighbourhood include Konnur High Road, Pilkington Road, Constable Road, Anderson Road, Loco Works Road, Carriage Works Road, Ayanavaram Road, Medavakkam Tank Road, and Phipps Road. The neighbourhood is served by the Ayanavaram bus depot. It a terminus which is attached with a depot for maintenance of buses.

== Rail transport ==
The neighbourhood is served by Perambur, Perambur Carriage Works, Perambur Loco Works, and Villivakkam railway stations.

== Medical facility ==
There is a medical facility viz., ESIS Hospital in Ayanavaram.

== Jeeva Park ==
The Jeeva park in United India colony in Ayanvavaram is with the statue of Sarvajña who was a sixteenth-century poet in the Kannada language. statue has been unveiled by the then Karnataka Chief Minister B. S. Yediyurappa in a ceremony that was presided over by the then Tamil Nadu Chief Minister, M. Karunanidhi. The statue is installed in the park in reciprocation of installing statue of Tiruvalluvar in Karnataka.

== Worship ==
Parasuramalingeswarar Temple, Kasiviswanathar Temple and Kariyamanikka Perumal Temple are situated in Ayanavaram. These three temples are maintained under the control of the Hindu Religious and Charitable Endowments Department of Government of Tamil Nadu.
