= Choolai =

- Neighbourhood
- Location within Chennai Location within Tamil Nadu Location within India
- Coordinates: 13.089657°N 80.267998°E
- Country: India
- State: Tamil Nadu
- District: Chennai
- Metro: Chennai
- Elevation: 5 m (16 ft)

Languages
  - Official: Tamil
- Time zone: UTC+5:30 (IST)
- PIN: 600112
- Telephone code: 044
- Planning agency: CMDA
- City: Chennai
- Lok Sabha constituency: Central Chennai
- Civic agency: Chennai Corporation

Choolai is a developed residential area in Central Chennai, a metropolitan city in Tamil Nadu.

== Location ==
Choolai is located near Chennai Central, 1 km from Chennai central railway station

Choolai has got its name because of the Brick kilns present in that area. There is still a road by the name "Brick Kiln Road" (Sengal choolai road) in Choolai, which proved its name reason. It was previously called as "Lakshmi Narasimhapuram".

Lord Natarajar temple in Choolai was built some 150 years back and is believed to be one of the very few temples built for lord Nataraja and only one in the city.

As like every other place in Chennai, Choolai has also got its heritage value and carries some history from the past. With contributions of Subbiah Muthiah from the book “Madras Miscellany” by which he has shown the 18th & 19th century and about the history and heritage of Madras. Here is the information gathered from his book regarding Choolai.

Choolai is known for its "Madras United Spinning & Weaving Mills (Choolai Mills)". In the late 19th and early 20th centuries, there were two composite textile mills in Madras – B&C in Perambur, owned by a British Company and Madras United Spinning & Weaving Mills in Choolai, fully owned and managed by an Indian. But due to the strikes and losses this was sold to Sardar Inderjit Singh & Sons of Delhi and later they sold it to Edward Textiles of Bombay. But due to the non-payment of tax arrears, government seized the mills and converted the buildings into godowns for the Food Corporation of India, which is still there in Choolai.

== Surroundings ==
Choolai is located in the midst of two major areas in North-Chennai, namely, Vepery, Periamet. Nehru Stadium is in the neighborhoods of Choolai.

== Transportation ==
Many number of busses ply through Choolai, And Central And Egmore is very near to Choolai
