= Purasawalkam =

Purasawalkam Purasai, Purasawakkam, purasaiwakkam
- Neighbourhood
- Nickname: Purasai
- Purasawalkam (Chennai) Purasawalkam (Tamil Nadu) Purasawalkam (India)
- Coordinates: 13.0902°N 80.2543°E
- Country: India
- State: Tamil Nadu
- District: Chennai
- Metro: Chennai

Government
  - Body: Greater Chennai Corporation
- Elevation: 53 m (174 ft)

Languages
  - Official: Tamil
- Time zone: UTC+5:30 (IST)
- PIN: 600084
- Vehicle registration: TN-01
- Planning agency: CMDA
- Civic agency: Greater Chennai Corporation
- Website: www.chennai.tn.nic.in

Purasawalkam, also known as Purasaiwakkam or Purasai / Purasawakkam, is a residential shopping area in the district of Chennai in the Indian state of Tamil Nadu.

== Politics ==
The defunct Purasawalkam legislative assembly constituency was a part of Chennai Central (Lok Sabha constituency).

== Colleges ==
- Madras Veterinary College
- Government College of Fine Arts, Chennai
