= Dharma Kidangu Mosque =

Mosque in Chennai, Tamil Nadu, India

- Location of the mosque in Chennai

Religion
- Affiliation: Islam
- Ecclesiastical or organizational status: Mosque
- Status: Active

Location
- Location: Angappa Street, Georgetown, Chennai, Tamil Nadu
- Country: India
- Interactive map of Dharma Kidangu Mosque
- Coordinates: 13°05′45″N 80°17′26″E

Architecture
- Type: Mosque architecture

The Dharma Kidangu Mosque is a mosque located in Angappa Naicken Street in the Georgetown neighbourhood of Chennai, in the state of Tamil Nadu, India. It is considered to be the oldest mosque in Muthialpet. The original mosque built of stone was demolished in 2008 and a new mosque built.

== See also ==
- Islam in India
- List of mosques in India
