= Dare House =

Art deco building in Chennai, India

- Interactive map of the Dare House area

General information
- Location: NSC Bose road, George Town, Chennai, Tamil Nadu, India
- Coordinates: 13.0891°N 80.2902°E

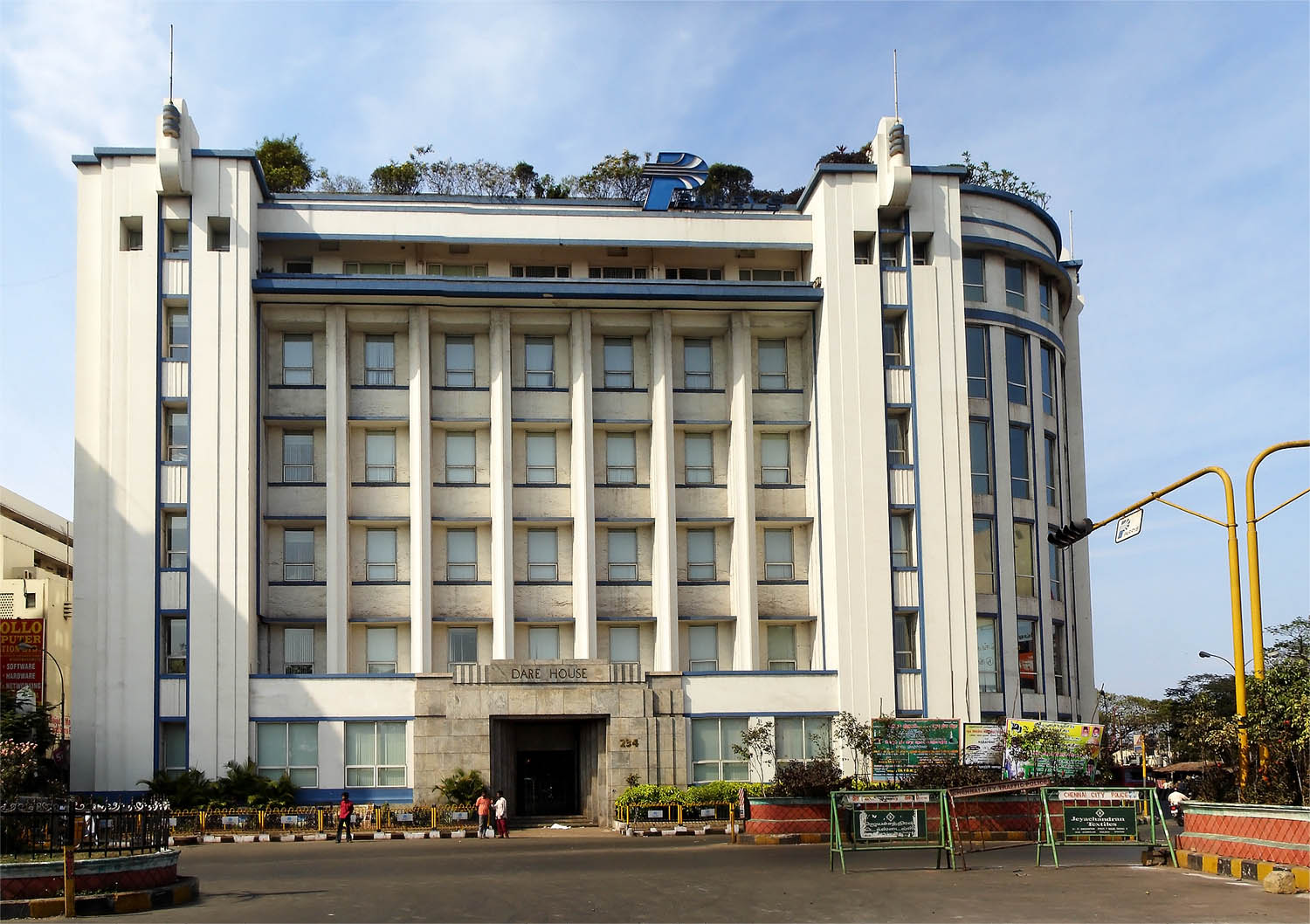
Dare House

Dare House is an iconic art deco building in Chennai, India which houses the offices of the Murugappa Group. Constructed between 1938 and 1940, it is named after William Dare, a partner of Parry & Co. from 1819 to 1838. Situated at the corner of Nethaji Subhash Chandra Bose Road where it forms a junction with Rajaji Salai overlooking Burma Bazaar and Chennai Harbour, the building is a prominent landmark and gives its name to the surrounding neighbourhood of Georgetown which is popularly known as Parry's Corner.

== History ==
The site where the building now stands was part of Muthialpet where Comte de Lally positioned his cannons during his siege of Fort St. George in 1758-59. When the Carnatic Wars ended, Black Town which stood to the south of Muthialpet was levelled and a new esplanade or open space created to provide a clear field of view for the artillery in case of an attack. The frontiers of the esplanade were marked with six boundary markers, five of which have disappeared. The only one that has survived is now located within the precincts of Dare House.

John Call, chief engineer of the East India Company constructed a garden house, one of the earliest buildings at the spot. He later sold it to Muhammad Ali Khan Wallajah, the Nawab of the Carnatic.

== Design ==
Dare House sports an emphasis on vertical lines and a distinct design of a 'sunburst jaali' for ventilation.

== See also ==
- Parry’s Corner
- Murugappa Group
- George Town
- Heritage structures in Chennai
