= Kondithope =

Village in Tamil Nadu, India

- Locality
- Location within Chennai Location within Tamil Nadu Location within India
- Coordinates: 13°06′11″N 80°16′38″E
- Country: India
- State: Tamil Nadu
- District: Chennai
- Elevation: 9 m (30 ft)
- Time zone: UTC+5:30 (IST)
- PIN: 60001
- STD code: 044

Kondithope is a locality in George Town, Chennai, Tamil Nadu, India. It has an average elevation of nine metres above the sea level.
