= Bairagimadam Temple =

Bairagimadam Prasanna Venkatesa Perumal Temple Sowcarpet

Religion
- Affiliation: Hinduism
- District: Chennai
- Deity: Lord Venkateswara

Location
- Location: Chennai
- State: Tamil Nadu
- Country: India

Architecture
- Type: Dravidian Architecture
- Creator: Laldas
- Completed: 19th century

Bairagimadam Temple is a Hindu temple located in Muthialpet, Parry's corner (Old: George Town) neighbourhood, in the city of Chennai, India. The temple was constructed in the 19th century by saint Laldas, and dedicated to Venkateswarawhich is similar to the Tirumala Sri Venkateshwara Swamy temple. All the festivals which are conducted on the hill shrine is being performed in a grand manner.The temple also has Padmavathi Thayar Shrine, Andal, Lakshmi Narasimhar Shrine, Rama with Sitaamma, Lakshmana swamy and Hanuman, Ranganatha Swamy shrine, Varadharaja Perumal Shrine, Bho Varaha Swamy shrine, Krishna shrine, Pundarikaksha Shrine and Lord Puri Jagannatha shrine. The temple also have sub-shrines of all the alwars and Acharyars totalling 27 of them in number. The temple also has varaha pushkarini where chakra snanam, the final day of the brahmotsavam is being performed there for both Perumal and Thayar and on the day of Radhasapthami.

The grand festivals celebrated in this temple are

1. Puratasi Brahmotsavam
2. Pavithrotsavam
3. Pallava Utsavam
4. Panguni Uttaram Kalyanotsavam
5. Andal Bhogi Kalyanotsavam
6. Radhasapthami Utsavam
7. Anna Koti Utsavam
8. Adyayana Utsavam
9. Thayar Navarathri Brahmotsavam
10. Andal Adipooram Utsavam

All Alwar acharyas varusha thirunakshatrams are also being performed and Eka dina Lakshaarchanai for Perumal, Thayar, Andal, Narasimhar and Hanuman is being performed yearly.
