= China Bazaar Road, Chennai =

Major road in Chennai, India

NSC Bose Road
- China Bazaar Road
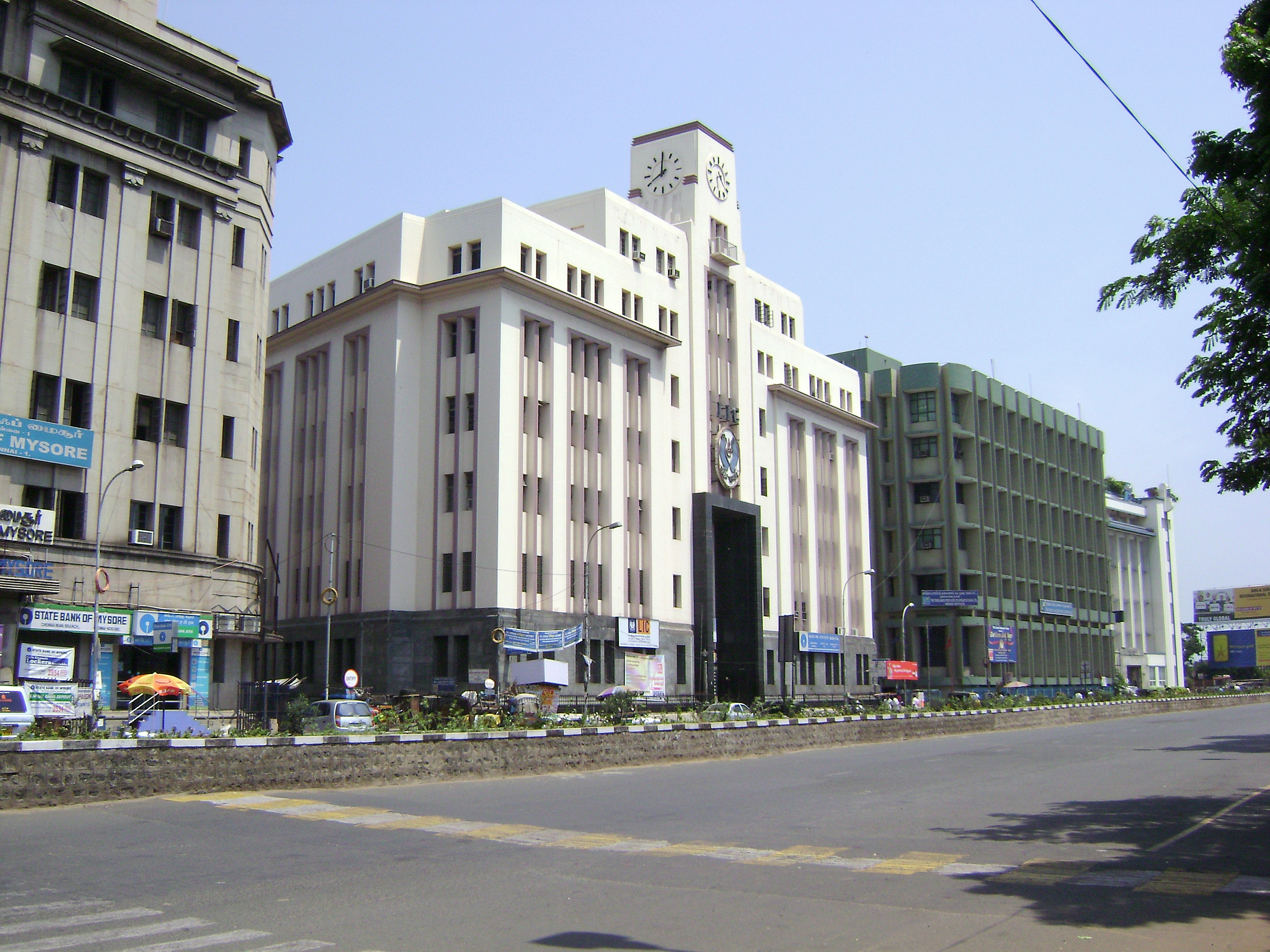
- Parry's Corner marks the eastern end of China Bazaar Road
- Interactive map of NSC Bose Road
- Maintained by: Corporation of Chennai
- Length: 0.93 mi (1.50 km)
- Coordinates: 13.02211°N 80.224618°E
- East end: Parry's Corner, George Town, Chennai
- West end: Wall Tax Road, Park Town, Chennai

China Bazaar Road, officially Netaji Subash Chandra Bose Road (or NSC Bose Road), is one of the main thoroughfares of the commercial centre of George Town in Chennai, India. The road connects Rajaji Salai in the east and Wall Tax Road in the west. Passing through thickly populated residential areas of the historical neighbourhood, the road has several streets, lanes, and by lanes joining it, housing several commercial establishments of the city.

== History ==
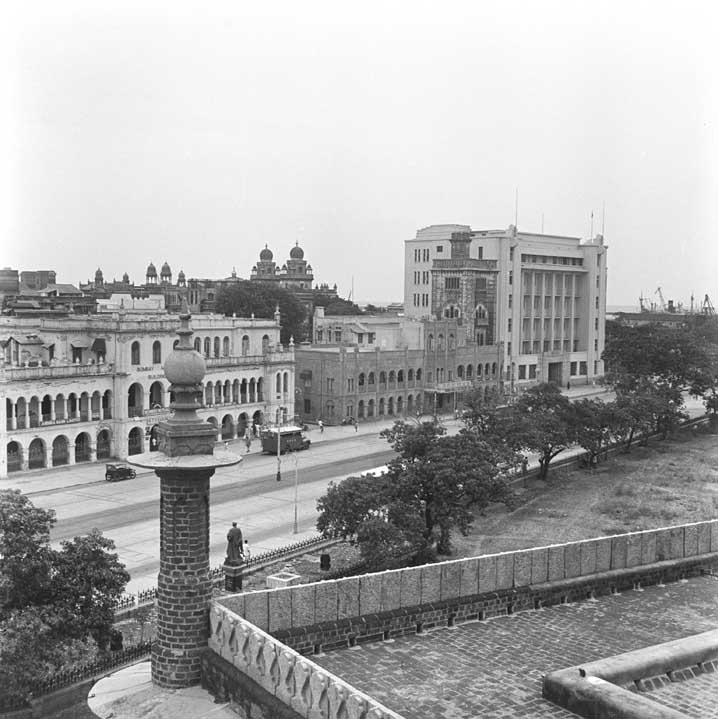
An aerial view of NSC Bose Road

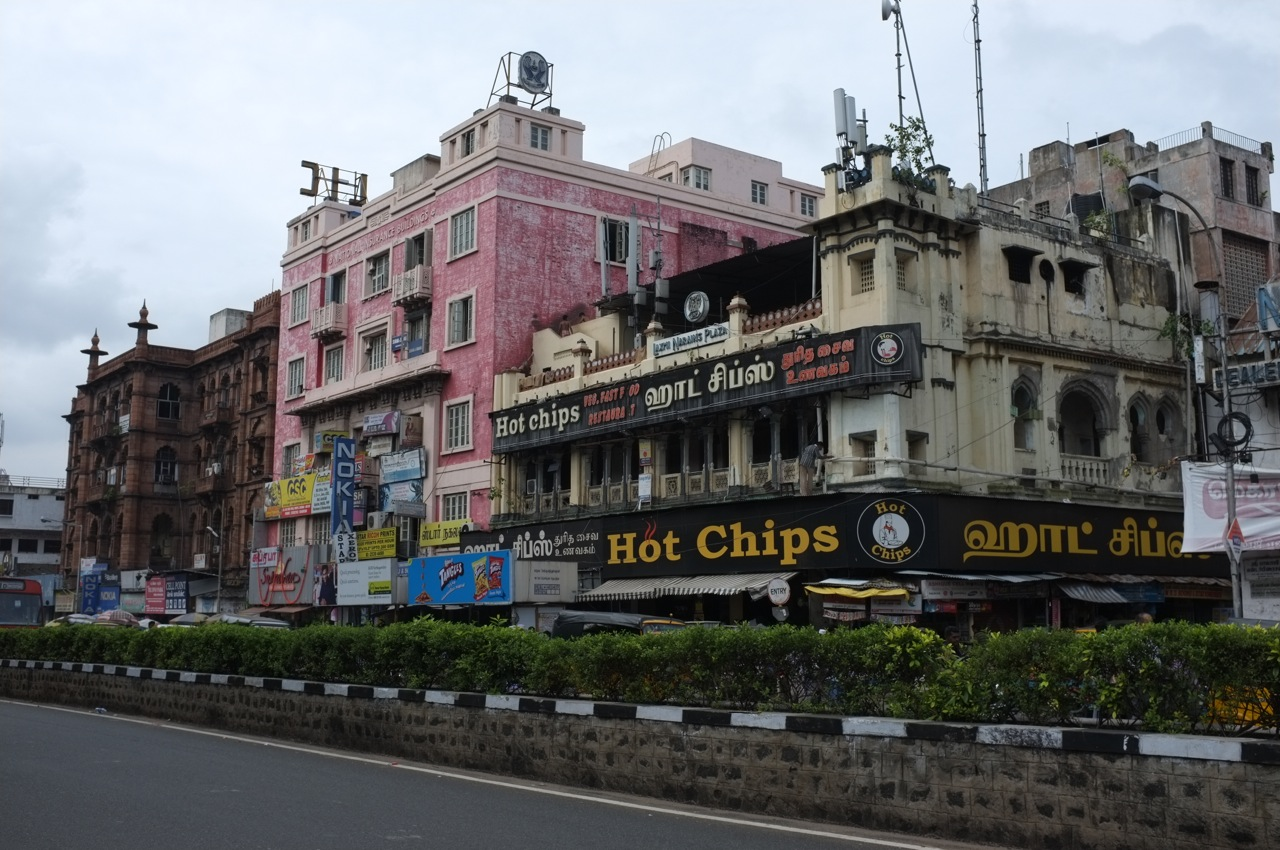
NSC Bose Road

After Fort St. George was built in 1640, a new township for the servants of the inmates of the fort, known as the Black Town, came up outside the fort to the northern side. In 1746, the French captured the town of Madras and, following the Treaty of Aix-la-Chapelle, returned the town to the English in 1749 in exchange for Quebec. Soon after this, the English flattened a part of the Black Town in order to have a clear field for fire in the event of an attack. In 1773, the English erected 13 pillars along the flattened area of the Black Town, banning all construction activities between the pillars and the fort as it might block the view of possible invaders. Soon a new Black Town was formed beyond these pillars, with the old Black Town giving way to the Madras High Court. A thoroughfare was formed along the stretch between the pillars and the high court, which eventually became known as China Bazaar Road. Of the 13 original pillars, only one survives today, which is being maintained in the compound of the Parry's building.

Till the 19th century, the road was occupied by a large number of tiled houses. In 1787, Thomas Parry, a Welsh businessman, bought the land with a garden house lying across the High Court buildings at the junction of NSC Bose Road and Rajaji Salai and developed it as a commercial complex housing the offices of Parry and Lane. The junction eventually became known as Parry's Corner.

In 1850, Pachaiyappa's Hall, another landmark on the road, was built and named after the philanthropist Pachaiyappa Mudaliar. The building remains today with the ground floor being occupied by several shops.

The road was one of the major junctions in the city when tram transportation began in 1895. The road also housed the Kothawal Chavadi market to where vegetables from various places around the city were brought. The market was considered the largest in Asia. The intense business in the market resulted in wholesale vegetable vendors renting the shops in the market on an hourly basis. The market remained in the area till 1996, when it was shifted to Koyambedu.

The road is also considered the origin of the jewellery market in the city. The road housed several gold and diamond merchants. The Madras Jewellers & Diamond Merchants' Association, which was established in 1938, was initially headquartered at China Bazaar Road. Later it was shifted to Car Street in Sowcarpet, but it again moved to its own premises on Badria Garden Lane, one of the several lanes of the road.

The office of the Consulate General of the United States was located on this road from 1908 till the 1950s before moving to the current location at the Gemini Circle.

== Landmarks ==
From the eastern side, the roads begins at the Parry's Corner and the eastern entrance of the Madras High Court, with the Beach railway station and Chennai Port lying further to the east marking the land's end. Famous landmarks of the road include Kuralagam, Broadway bus terminus, St. Mary's Anglo-Indian Higher Secondary School, Kothawal Chavadi vegetable market, and flower market, in addition to several places of worship. The twin temples of Sri Chenna Mallikeshwarar and Sri Chennakesava Perumal are located on the road.

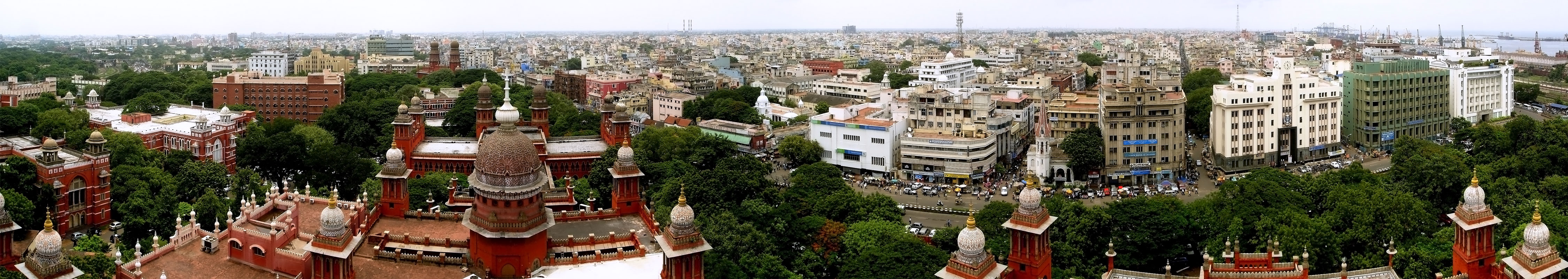
Panoramic view of NSC Bose Road from the Madras High Court buildings

== The present-day road ==
NSC Bose Road runs from Parry's Corner on the east to Wall Tax Road on the west for a length of 1.5 km. The width of the road ranges from 50 m near Parry's Corner to 10 m near Wall Tax Road junction. However, owing to congestion, less than one-third of the road remains motorable in many parts, chiefly between Wall Tax Road and Flower Bazaar.

Despite the central business district of the city having moved gradually towards the south side, the road still remains an important commercial hub of the city. The thoroughfare is the second biggest bullion market in the country. For a long time, it remained the nerve centre of the city till the principal bus terminus was shifted to Koyambedu in 2002. Wholesale businesses based in this area includes drugs, cosmetics, hardware, stationery, and grocery. Every street radiating from the road is known for its own distinct business. For instance, Badrian Street located opposite the Flower Bazaar houses the city's retail flower trade. Although, the wholesale trade has been shifted to Koyambedu with the shifting of the Kothawal Chavadi market, there are still several shops on Badrian Street dealing with varieties of flowers. Devaraja Mudali Street, which lies closer to the Chenna Kesavaperumal temple, is famous for turmeric and kumkum powder meant for Hindu ritual purposes, with several shopkeepers having it as their family business.

The tiled houses of the 18th and 19th centuries, many with a verandah on the top, have been gradually replaced with modern commercial complexes. However, there are few buildings that still remain on the western side of the NSC Bose Road and Govindappa Naicken Street.

In January 2013, further to the public interest litigation petition filed in the court, the Corporation decided to improve the 1.5-acre Broadway bus terminus at an estimated cost of ₹ 33.6 million.

== See also ==
- Parry's Corner
- George Town
- History of Chennai

== Bibliography ==
- Muthiah, S. (1981). Madras Discovered. East West Books (Madras) Pvt Ltd. p. 124.
