= The Rising Sun (magazine) =

Indian fortnightly magazine

The Rising Sun is an Indian fortnightly magazine published by Dravida Munnetra Kazhagam (DMK), one of the major political parties in southern India.

== History ==
It was started at Kalaivanar Arangam in 1971 for carrying messages of Dravida Munnetra Kazhagam to other places. At that time, the editor of The Rising Sun was Murasoli Maran. After that it discontinued. In 2005, M. Karunanidhi restarted this magazine at Anna Institute but later it stopped for one more time. On 26 September 2021, M. K. Stalin re-released the magazine at the same institute.
