= Wallajah Road, Chennai =

Road in Chennai

Wallajah Road in Chennai, Tamil Nadu, India branches off from Anna Salai. It is one of the major link roads in Chennai, connecting Anna Salai and Rajaji Salai, Chennai. It starts from the Arignar Anna Statue (Wallajah Road Junction) and reaches Marina Beach at Rajaji Salai. The new State guest house being constructed in Omandurar Government Estate is nearing completion in February 2016.

== Major companies and organizations located at this road includes ==
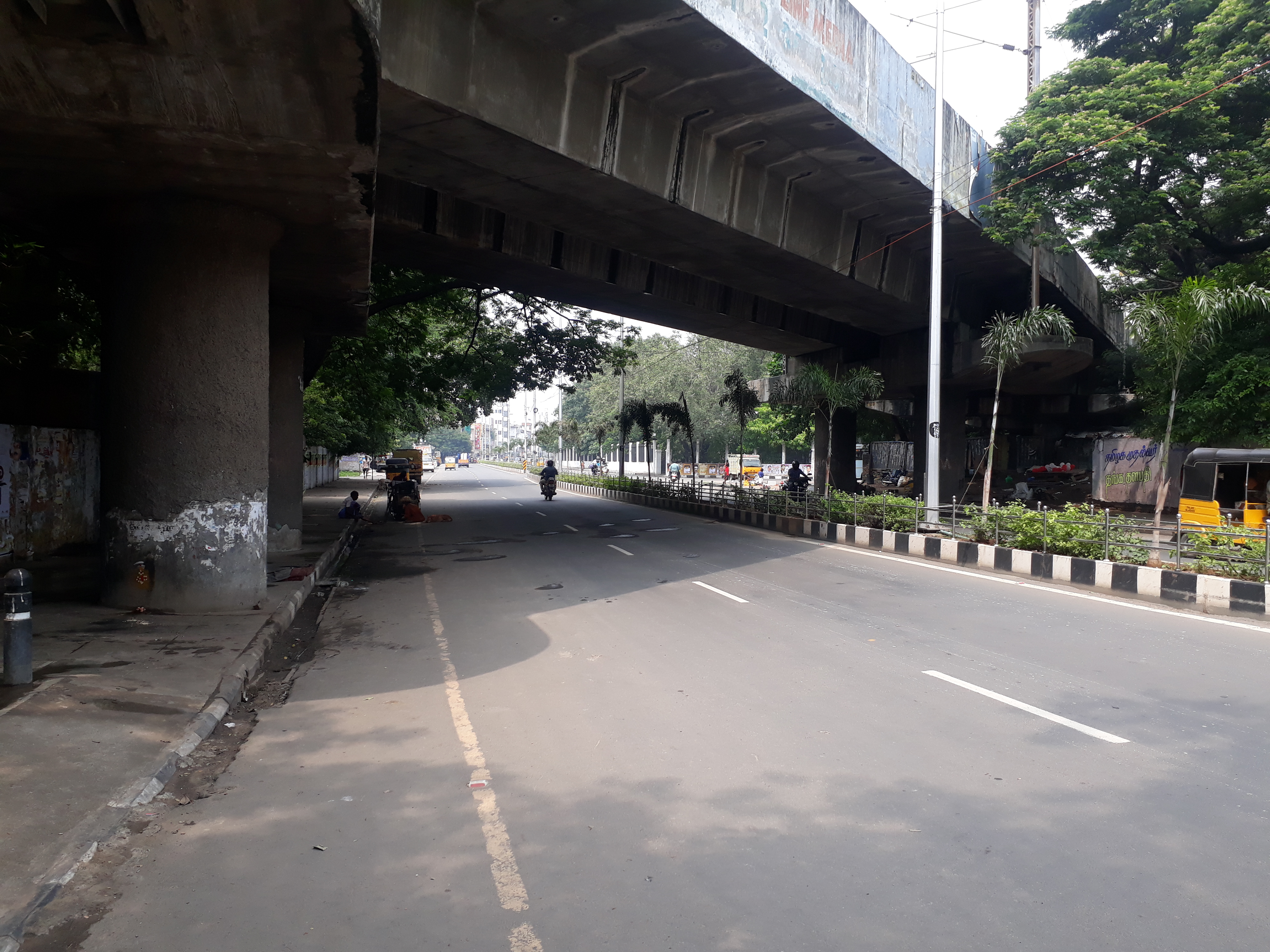
Wallajah Road, in Chennai

- Tamil Nadu Government Multi Super Speciality Hospital
- Government Medical College at 'B' Block
- Tamil Nadu Tourism Development Corporation Headquarters
- Narayanas Arihant Ocean Tower
- Channel UFX
- Kalaivanar Arangam
- State Guest House
- M. A. Chidambaram Stadium
- Chepauk railway station
- University of Madras
