= Narayanas Arihant Ocean Tower =

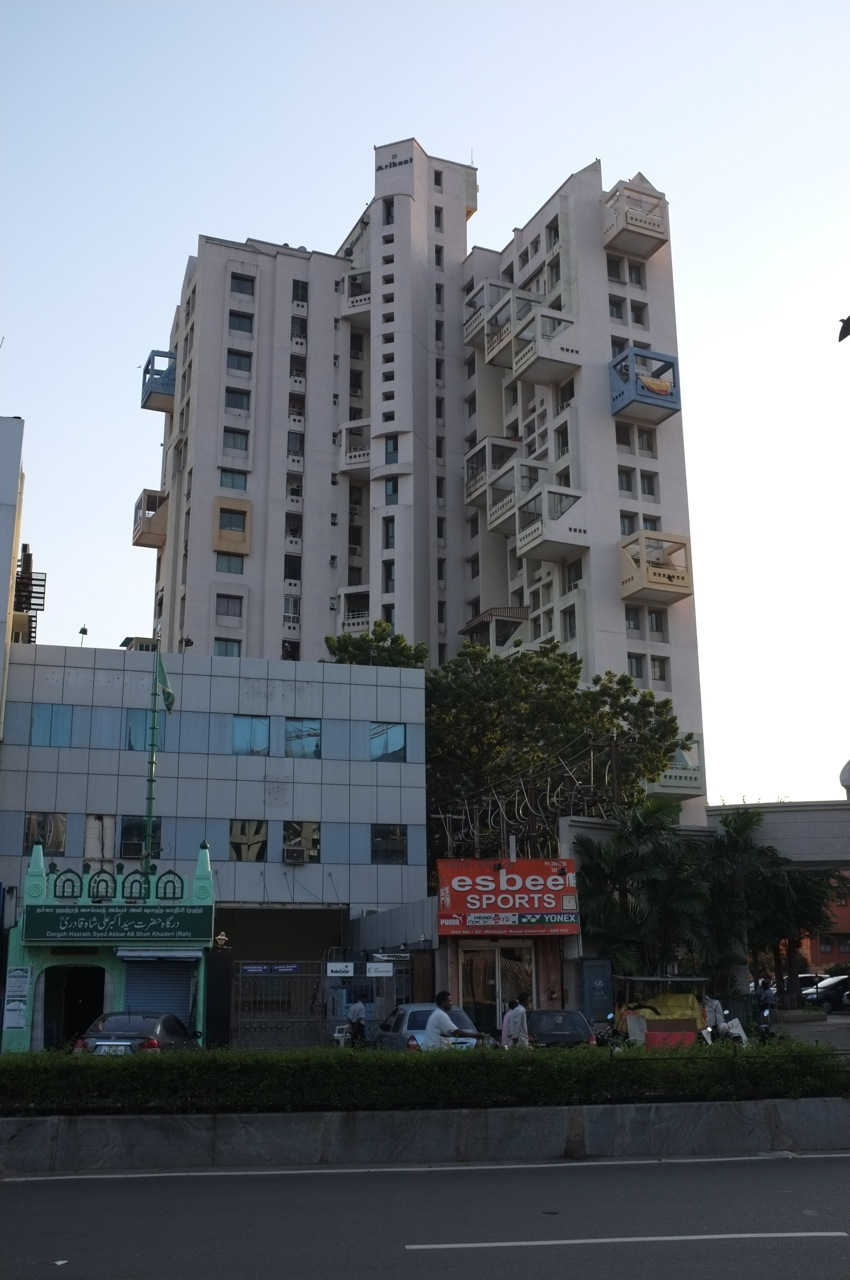
- Arihant Ocean Tower
- Interactive map of the Narayanas Arihant Ocean Tower area

General information
- Type: Residential
- Architectural style: Modernism
- Location: Wallajah Road, Triplicane, Chennai, India, 77 Wallajah Road, Triplicane, Chennai, Tamil Nadu 600 005, India
- Coordinates: 13.065521°N 80.275101°E
- Completed: December 2001
- Cost: ₹ 114.4 million

Height
- Roof: 63.24 m (207.5 ft)

Technical details
- Floor count: 18
- Floor area: 140,000 sq ft (13,000 m^{2})

Design and construction
- Developer: Arihant Foundations & Housing Limited

Narayanas Arihant Ocean Tower is an 18-storied residential building in Chennai, India. Located on Wallajah Road, off the arterial Anna Salai, the building has 80 housing units with a total built-up area of 140,000 sq ft. It is the tallest residential building located in downtown Chennai.

== History ==
The building was constructed on the land where Paragon Talkies, one of the oldest cinema theatres in the city, formerly stood. This theatre was owned by Presidency Talkies Private Limited.

== See also ==
- List of tallest buildings in Chennai
