= Peddanaickenpettah =

Coordinates: 13.098748°N 80.277443°E

Peddanaickenpettah is a locality in the city of Chennai, India. It forms a part of the neighbourhood of Georgetown.

== History ==
In 1750, after the French had evacuated Madras, the native inhabitants of "Black Town" were moved to the suburbs of Muthialpet and Peddanaickenpettah which were jointly called "New Black Town". The new suburbs were separated from "Old Black Town" by massive fortifications. Peddanaickenpettah was unsuccessfully besieged for 69 days by the French general Comte de Lally in 1759.

The Chennakesava Perumal Temple in "Old Black Town" which was demolished to make way for fortifications was subsequently reconstructed in Peddanaickenpettah on land granted by the government in 1766.
