= Saint Damien School =

Location
- 1401 Houghtailing Street; Honolulu, Hawaii 96817; United States; 21.33124°N 157.86781°W

Information
- Type: Private
- Motto: Latin: Viriliter age ("Act courageously")
- Religious affiliations: Roman Catholic; Congregation of Christian Brothers
- Patron saint: Saint Damien De Veuster of Moloka‘i
- Established: 1962
- Sister school: Damien High School
- President: Wally Marciel
- Principal: Dr. Pua Higa
- Grades: 6–12
- Gender: Co-educational
- Enrollment: 480 (2025-2026)
- Colors: Mauve and gold
- Mascot: Lion
- Team name: Monarchs
- Accreditation: Western Association of Schools and Colleges
- Newspaper: Ke Ali'i
- Website: www.damien.edu

Saint Damien School is a private Roman Catholic preparatory school for boys and girls in grades 6–12 in Kalihi, Honolulu, Hawaii, United States. Located in the Roman Catholic Diocese of Honolulu, the school is sponsored by the Congregation of Christian Brothers and is accredited by the Western Association of Schools and Colleges.

== History and origins ==
At the end of World War II, the Catholic Diocese of Honolulu saw the need for a second Catholic school on Oahu. The new school was named after Saint Damien de Veuster, who devoted his life to caring for Hansen's Disease patients on Molokai during the 19th century. The Congregation of Christian Brothers, parents and students volunteered to turn the land - which included 4 acres (16,000 m^{2}) of taro patches and a good deal of uneven swampland - into a school campus because the company that started construction on Damien went bankrupt. Damien became coeducational beginning from the 2012–13 school year.

On April 13, 2023, Damien Memorial School joined with their sister school, Damien High School of La Verne, California, for the first time and planned events to hold between the two schools. In the beginning week of September 2023, Damien High School visited Damien Memorial for the second time, joining together for their first joined liturgy and football match held in the nearby Farrington High School.

On September 24, 2026, Damien Memorial School was renamed to Saint Damien School.

== Athletics ==
Damien, in its 60 years of athletic competition, has primarily played within Division II. As recently as the 2021–2022 season, Damien's Varsity Boys Baseball Team had emerged as Division II State Champions, representing the Interscholastic League of Honolulu and winning the ILH their third consecutive state championship.

== Notable alumni ==
- Frank De Lima, comedian
- Joe DeSa, MLB first baseman
- Kealoha Pilares, NFL player
- Chris Truby, MLB third baseman
- Inoke Breckterfield, University of Wisconsin defensive line coach
- Jacob Batalon, actor L.A
