= Viriliter age =

Latin phrase

Viriliter age is a Latin phrase often used as a motto; lit. Act Manfully, but often given the new age translation Act Courageously. The origins of the phrase and the context for its use are from Psalm 27. It is or has been the official motto of the following institutions:

- Cardinal Newman College Alumni Association, Buenos Aires, Argentina
- Christian Brothers College, Bulawayo, Zimbabwe
- Christian Brothers' College, Mount Edmund, Pretoria, South Africa
- Damien Memorial School, Honolulu, Hawaii
- Kilgraston School, Bridge of Earn, Scotland
- Marist College Ashgrove adopted the motto in 1957
- PAREF Southridge School, Muntinlupa, Metro Manila, Philippines
- Presentation Brothers College, Cork, Ireland
- St Chad's College, Wolverhampton
- St Columbas High School, Athlone, Cape Town, South Africa
- St. Edward's College (former motto)
- St. John The Baptist High School Thane, Maharashtra, India
- St Joseph's College, Kolkata, India
- St. Mary's Anglo-Indian Higher Secondary School, Armenian Street, Chennai (Madras), India.
- St. Muredach's College, Ballina, Co. Mayo. Ireland
- St-Paul College, Godinne, Belgium
- St. Paul's RC High School, Coleshill, United Kingdom (Closed 1971)
- Synge Street CBS, Dublin, Ireland
- The Sacred Heart School of Montreal, Quebec, Canada
- Trinity College, Perth, Western Australia
- Trinity Grammar School, Kew, Melbourne, Australia
- St. Sebastian's College, Moratuwa, Moratuwa, Sri Lanka
- Cantwell High School, Montebello, California. (Cantwell-Sacred Heart of Mary since 1991).
