= Inoke Breckterfield =

American football player and coach (born 1977)

Current position
- Title: Defensive ends coach
- Team: Utah
- Conference: Big 12

Biographical details
- Born: April 25, 1977 (age 49); Honolulu, Hawaii, U.S.

Playing career
- 1995–1998: Oregon State
- 1999: Edmonton Eskimos*
- 1999: Toronto Argonauts
- 2001–2003: Winnipeg Blue Bombers
- Position: Defensive end

Coaching career (HC unless noted)
- 2006: Oregon State (volunteer)
- 2007–2008: Oregon State (GA)
- 2009: Weber State (DL)
- 2010: Montana (DL)
- 2011: UCLA (DL)
- 2012–2014: Pittsburgh (DT)
- 2015–2020: Wisconsin (DL)
- 2021: Vanderbilt (DT)
- 2022–2023: Washington (DL)
- 2024–2025: Baylor (DL)
- 2026–present: Utah (DE)

Accomplishments and honors

Awards
- First-team All-Pac-10 (1998); Second-team All-Pac-10 (1997)

Inoke Breckterfield [ee-NO-kay] (born April 25, 1977) is an American football coach who is currently the defensive ends coach for the Utah Utes. He played in the Canadian Football League (CFL) for the Toronto Argonauts (1999) and Winnipeg Blue Bombers (2001–2003). He was an All-American defensive end at Oregon State University in 1998.

== Early life and family ==
Breckterfield attended Damien Memorial High School in Honolulu where he was a standout football player and track performer in the shot put. He graduated from Damien High in 1995. He is of Fijian, I-Kiribati, German, Samoan and Rotuman descent. His parents are both from Fiji. He is Paul Manueli's grand-nephew, Breckterfield's grandfather is Paul Manueli's older sibling. He and his wife, Carol, have three sons. Kalevi, is the oldest, and he played football at Cardinal Wuerl North Catholic and now plays for the Madison Edgewood Crusaders. And twin boys, Rocky and Riley. Carol played soccer for University of Southern California (USC) from 1996 to 1998, where she also was an all-conference selection.

== Playing career ==
=== College ===
Breckterfield played for Oregon State in the fall of 1995. In his time at Oregon State, he made a name for himself as a dominant defensive end in the Pac-10. Breckterfield was named a third-team All-American in 1998 after being named first team All-Pac-10 Conference. He was also the recipient of the prestigious Morris Trophy, awarded annually to the conference's top defensive lineman. He was selected to play in the Hula Bowl his senior season as well. Breckterfield finished his OSU career as the leader for tackles-for-loss (55.5) and sacks (19.5). He currently ranks second in both.

=== Professional ===
After his time with the Beavers, Breckterfield played in the Canadian Football League with the Toronto Argonauts (1999) and Winnipeg Blue Bombers (2001–03).

== Coaching career ==
Breckterfield was the defensive line coach at the University of Wisconsin–Madison and was previously a defensive line coach at the University of Pittsburgh. He was also an assistant coach at the University of California, Los Angeles (UCLA) and before that at University of Montana. Before moving to Montana he was an assistant coach at Weber State University and a graduate assistant coach for Oregon State University with his former coach, Mike Riley during the 2007 and 2008 seasons.

=== Vanderbilt ===
Brechterfield joined Clark Lea's inaugural staff at Vanderbilt for the 2021 season.

=== Washington ===
In December 2021, it was announced that Breckterfield would be leaving Vanderbilt after one season to take the same role at the University of Washington.
