= Mamoor Mosque =

Mosque in Chennai, Tamil Nadu, India

- Location of the mosque in Chennai

Religion
- Affiliation: Islam
- Ecclesiastical or organizational status: Mosque
- Status: Active

Location
- Location: George Town, Chennai, Tamil Nadu
- Country: India
- Interactive map of Mamoor Mosque
- Coordinates: 13°05′40″N 80°17′24″E

Architecture
- Type: Mosque architecture
- Established: 18th century

Specifications
- Minaret: One
- Materials: Granite

The Mamoor Mosque, also known as the Masjid-e-Mamoor and sometimes referred to as the Big Mosque, is a mosque located in Chennai, Tamil Nadu, India. The mosque is situated on Angappan Street in George Town, also called Muthialpet, and is the oldest surviving mosque in George Town.

The mosque was built in the 18th century on the same design as Wallajah Mosque, and was rebuilt in granite by the Nawab of Carnatic, Muhammad Ali Khan Wallajah, in the late 19th century. Since then, the mosque has been frequently renovated.

== See also ==
- Islam in India
- List of mosques in India
