= Kalaivanar Arangam =

Auditorium in Chennai, Tamil Nadu, India

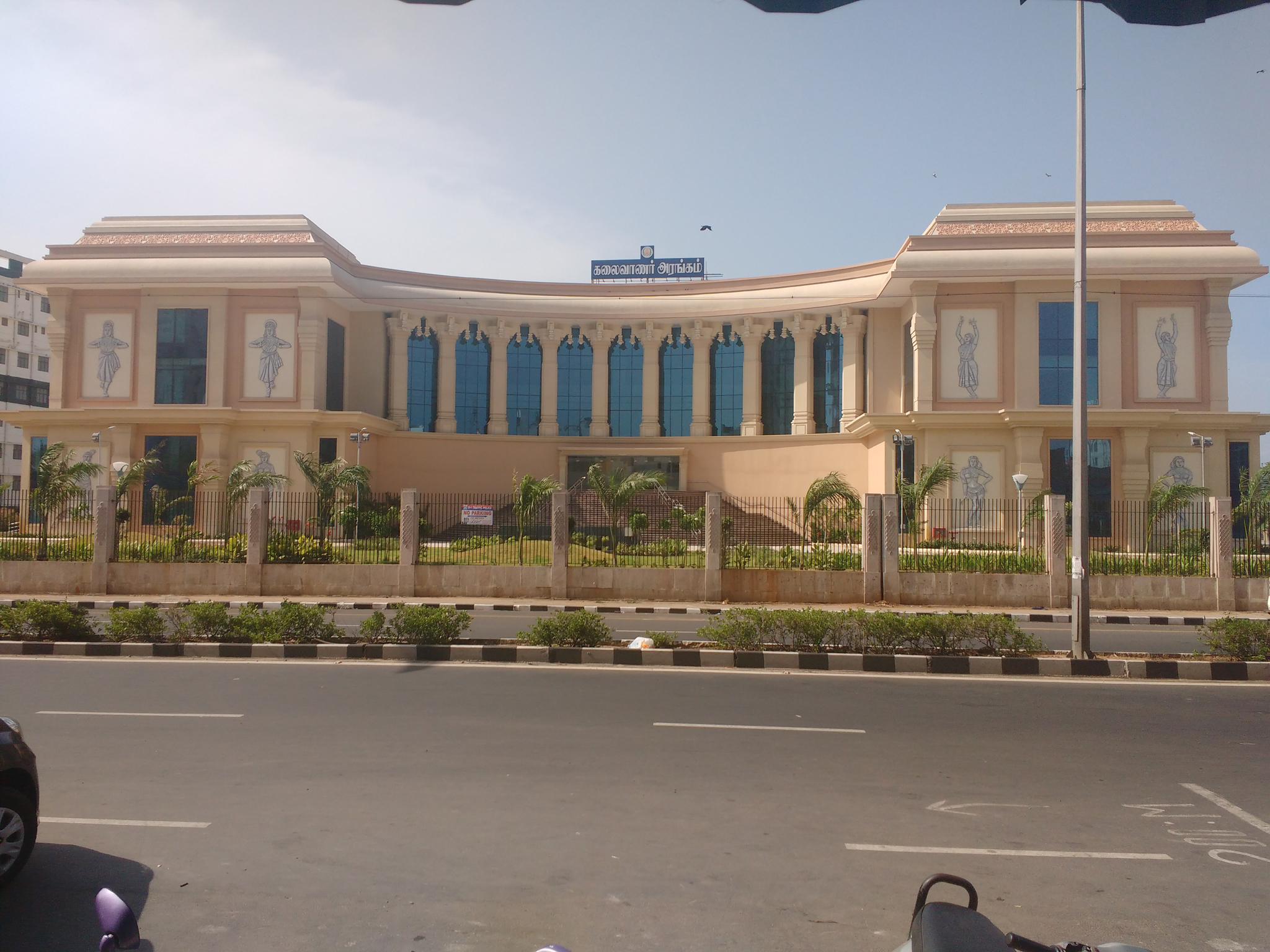
Kalaivanar Arangam - an auditorium in Chennai India. Historically this building is one of the leading landmarks in the city of Chennai.

Kalaivanar Arangam is an auditorium situated at Wallajah Road in Chennai, Tamil Nadu, India. Named after N. S. Krishnan, The completely air-conditioned auditorium has seats for 1,100 persons on the first and second floors and about 1,300 persons on the third floor.

== History ==
Originally built as an assembly building in 1952, the legislature functioned from here. In 1974, the then Chief Minister M. Karunanidhi inaugurated the renovated auditorium. The auditorium was later demolished and built again with state-of-the-art facilities. Chief Minister Jayalalithaa inaugurated the present auditorium in February 2016.
