= Muthialpet =

Town in Puducherry, India

- town
- Location in Puducherry, India
- Coordinates: 11.955071°N 79.834492°E
- Country: India
- State: Puducherry
- District: Pondicherry
- Elevation: 0 m (0 ft)

Languages
  - Official: Tamil
  - Additional: English, French
- Time zone: UTC+5:30 (IST)
- PIN: 605 003
- Telephone code: 0413

Muthialpet is an Assembly constituency in the union territory of Puducherry in India.

== Important Places/Monuments ==
- MR Beach SolaiNagar
- Clock Tower
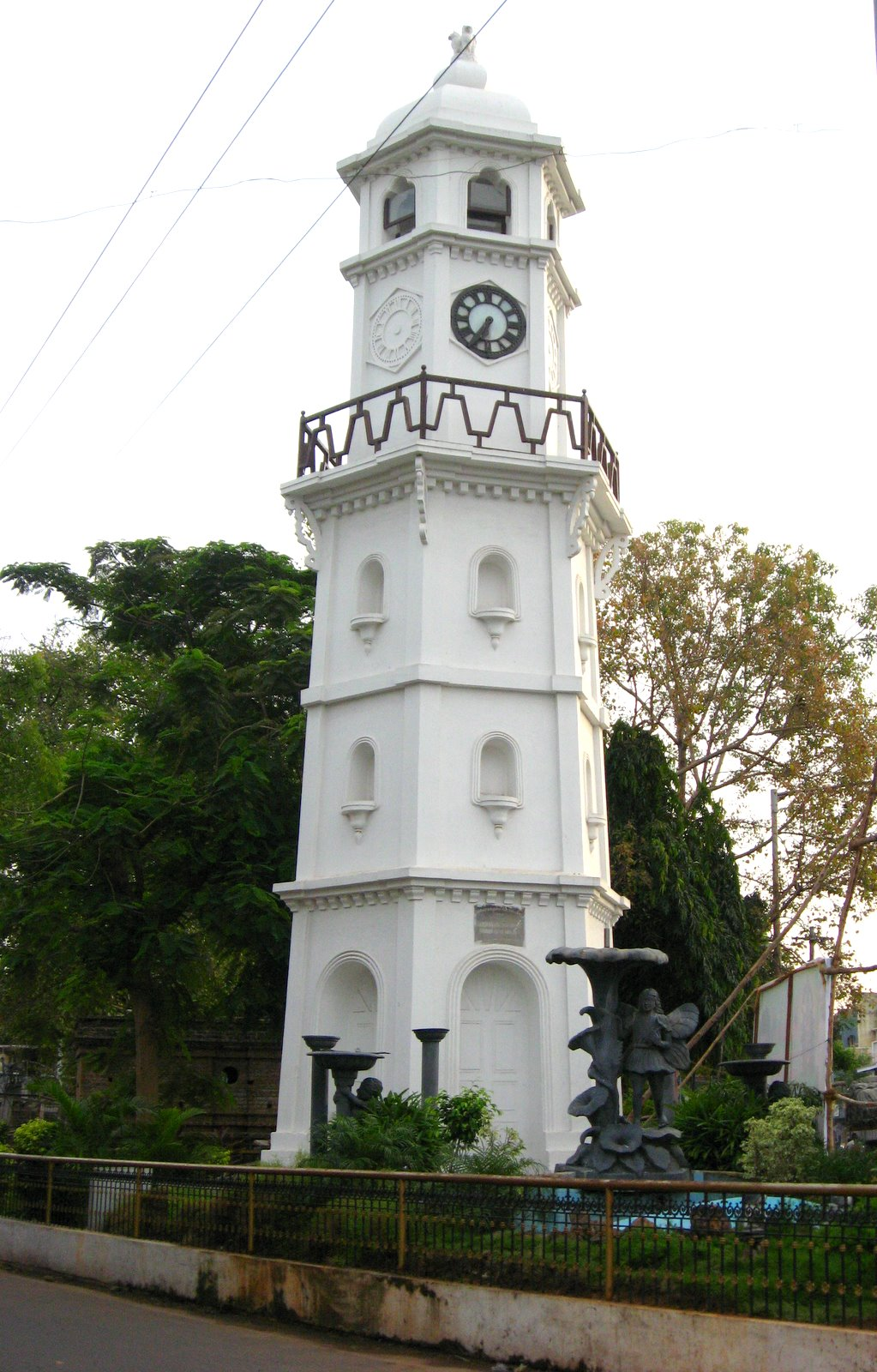
  Muthialpet Clock Tower
- Market A 100-year-old market complex in Muthialpet
- Ashram Play-ground A common playground for the members of the Aurobindo Ashram

== Important Events ==
=== Masi Maham Festival ===
Masi Makam or Masi Magam is an important festival in the Tamil speaking world. The festival falls in the Tamil month of Masi (mid-February to mid-March). Maham or Makam is one among the twenty-seven stars in the astrological system. The makam star in the Masi month usually falls on the full moon day and is considered highly auspicious in many temples across southern India, especially in Tamil Nadu, Puducherry and Kerala. One of the important rituals on this day is the taking of idols to the seashore or ponds. Therefore, the festival is also referred to as a holy bath ceremony. Long processions from different temples arrive at the shore with idols of Vishnu and Shiva. Idols from Shakti temples are also brought to the shore. Pujas and other rituals are held and thousands of devotees throng the shore to offer prayer. It is celebrated in Muthialpet, on the shore at the fishing hamlet of Vaithikuppam.

=== Sedal Festival of Senkazhuneer Amman Temple ===
The famous sedal is understood to mean self-imposed physical torture undertaken by devotees who pierce small silver hooks and spears in their body or tongues in fulfillment of some vow. It is said that as many as 100 needles are pierced over their bodies. They then go in a procession after a bath clad in turmeric strained clothes.

=== Soorasamhaaram of Sri Sundara Vinayakar Subramanya Swamy Siddhivinayaka Temple ===
Muthialpet murugan temple

For, the people of Muthialpet, living around the Sri Sundara Vinayakar Subramanya Swamy Siddhivinayaka Temple, reserve the celebrations for the final day of the annual Skanda Sashti. This festival has been celebrated since 1861. They wear new clothes and burst crackers at the time of the Soorasamharam when Lord Muruga waged a battle with Soorapadman. The Skanda Sashti festival celebrated annually for more than a century, is unique to Muthialpet. Those living around the Murugan Temple, especially the Sengunthar Mudaliars consider it more important than Deepavali. According to mythology, Skanda Sashti is a six-day battle between the evil demon – Soorapadman and Lord Muruga, who finally kills the asura with the Vel (lance). The story of the Lord defeating Soorapadman and his cronies – Singa Mugan and Yaanai Mugan – is enacted through traditional theatre form by groups of men in Muthialpet. The rituals will usually begin by 9.30 p.m. Rockets zoomed from one end of the rope to another to depict the powerful arrows of Lord Muruga. Soorapadman used to torment the devas. Lord Muruga came to their rescue. He threw his vel at the demon, which tore him into two halves – one became a peacock, which is the Lord's vahana (vehicle), and the other a cock that was placed on His flag. It is a time when divine intervention brings good to the people. The killing of the asura reminds us to stick to the path of righteousness. Though it seems just like any other play with men dressed up like asuras and devas, there is an element of divinity in the performance. People fast during the six days and those taking part in the play are more austere. That day whoever visits Muthialpet is welcomed into homes and offered something to eat.

ஆவியுடன் உடலுமற்றைப் பொருள் முழுதும் உனக்கேயென்றளித்த பின்னும் பாவிகள்போல மிடியாலும் பிணியாலும் துயரமுறப் பண்ணலாமோ காவியங்கைக் குஞ்சரியாள் மணவாளா கருங்குறப்பெண் கணைக்கண்மோகா மூவிரண்டு முகத்தெந்தாய்! முத்தியால்பேட்டை வளர் முருகவேளே!

வண்ணச்சரபம் தண்டபாணி சுவாமிகள்.

18th century Temple.

=== St. Rozario Festival ===
This festival is celebrated during the month of October. People who live in that street are mainly Christians who consider that festival more important. This festival is celebrated for 10 days. The first 9 days car procession takes place around the church. The 10th-day car procession goes to the entire street. During the procession both Hindus and Christians in that street welcome Mary with flowers and candles. This is the most important festival for Christians living in Muthialpet.

=== Vellavari Fire-Walk Festival ===
In the name of goddess Sri Panchali/Dhowpathy, people who vow to take part in the fire walking ordeal observe 40 days fast and wear saffron-coloured clothes and after a purificatory bath, walk through the fire stretch to the astonishment of the spectators.

=== St. Antony's church feast ===
This festival takes place in the month of June. All Christians in Muthialpet celebrate this festival greatly. This festival is celebrated for 10 days.

== See also ==
- Peddanaickenpettah
