= St. Mary's Anglo-Indian Higher Secondary School =

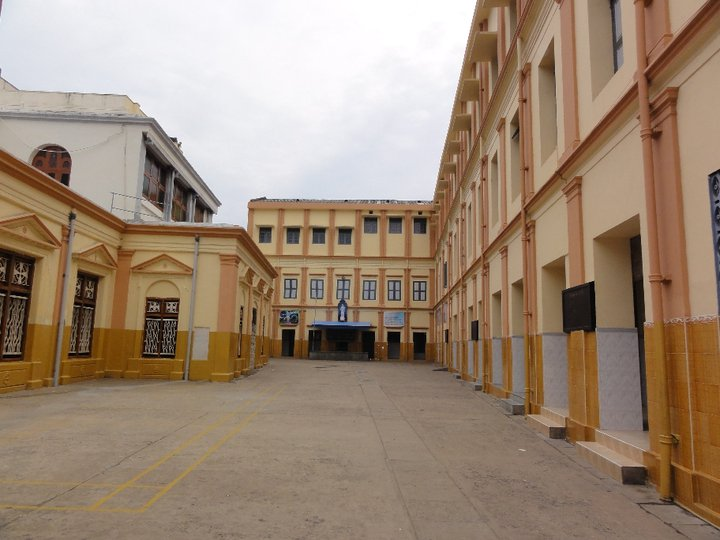
- Chennai, Tamil Nadu; India

Information
- Type: Private secondary school
- Motto: in pursuit of excellence
- Established: 1839; 187 years ago
- Faculty: 40
- Grades: 1 - 12
- Enrollment: 1800
- Houses: Anthony (amber), Bosco (blue), Gabriel (green) and Rua (red)
- Colours: Green, red, blue and yellow
- Former pupils: St. Marians/Marians

St. Mary's Anglo-Indian Higher Secondary School is a Catholic higher secondary school for boys in Chennai, Tamil Nadu, India, operated by the Salesians of Don Bosco. It is located on Armenian Street, Broadway opposite the High Court and adjacent to St Mary's Co-Cathedral.

St. Mary's is one of the oldest schools in India, and one of the first five schools to be set up during the British period. It stands out today among the city schools for having often secured centum results in the Board Exams.

== History ==
Saint Mary's Anglo Indian Higher Secondary School was founded in 1839 by Joseph Carew for the purpose of affording the Catholic youth of Madras an education. It was known for nearly 44 years as St. Mary's Seminary and Day School. The first principal was William Kelly of Maynooth. The school celebrated its 175th year celebrations recently.

== Motto ==
The school's motto is "Viriliter Age" - Latin for "Act Like A Man".

== Gallery ==
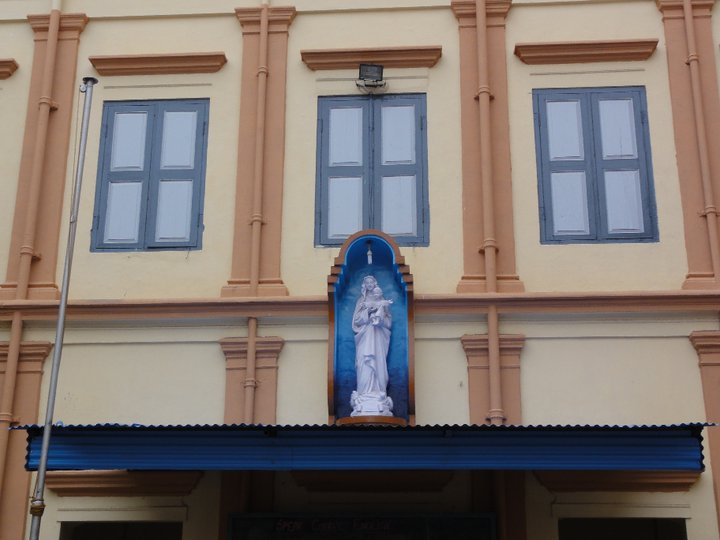
School's Patron Saint - Virgin Mother Mary

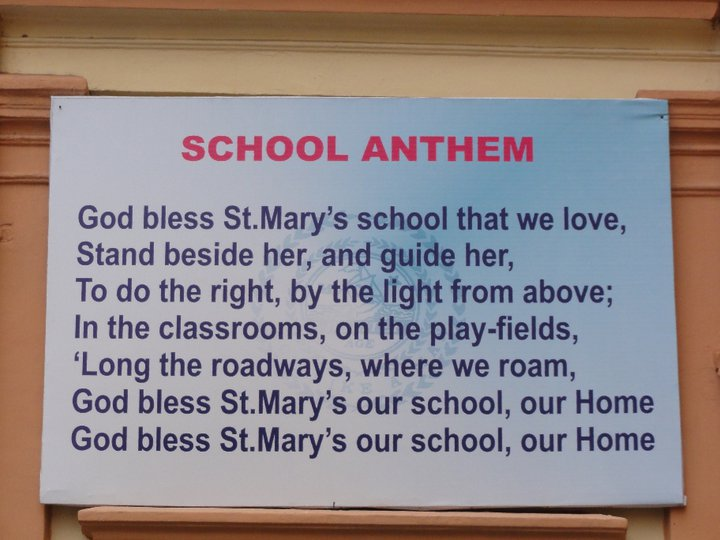
School Anthem

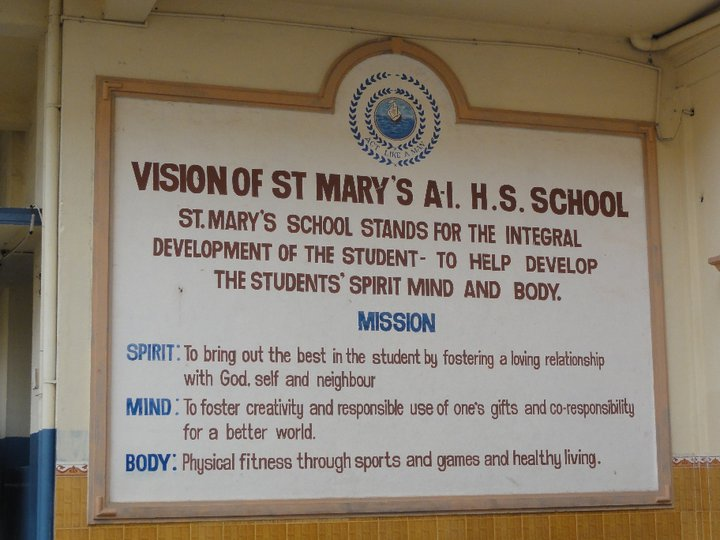
School's Vision and Mission
