= George Town, Chennai =

George Town Muthialpet, Parry's Corner, Broadway
- Neighbourhood
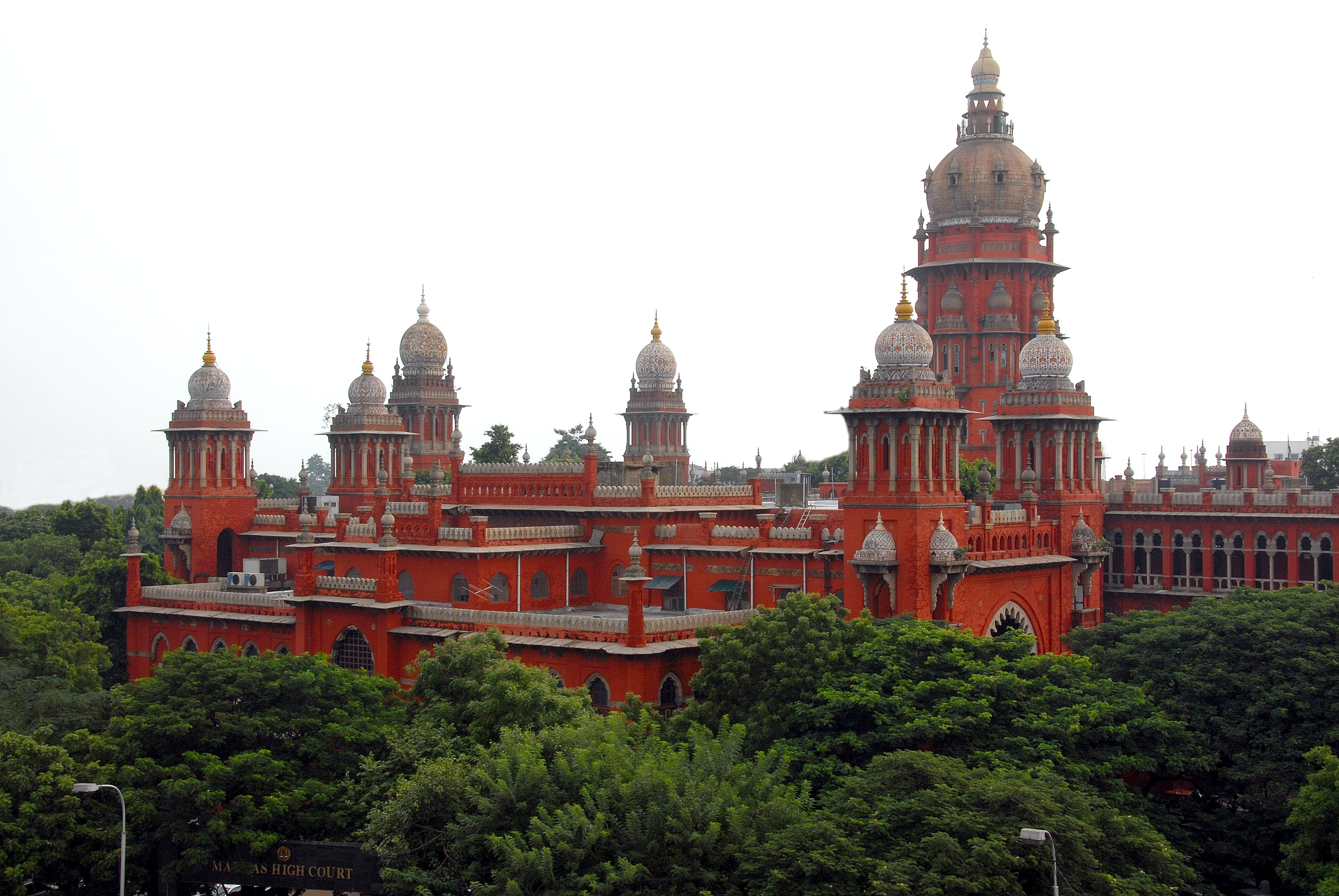
- High Court of Madras at Chennai.

- Location within Chennai
- Coordinates: 13.0939°N 80.2839°E
- Country: India
- State: Tamil Nadu
- District: Chennai District
- Metro: Chennai
- Ward: Muthialpet
- Established: 1640
- Founder: British East India Company
- Named for: King George V

Government
  - Body: Chennai Corporation

Area
  - Total: 4 km^{2} (1.5 sq mi)

Languages
  - Official: Tamil
- Time zone: UTC+5:30 (IST)
- PIN: 600001
- Lok Sabha constituency: Chennai Central
- Planning agency: CMDA
- Civic agency: Chennai Corporation
- Website: www.chennai.tn.nic.in

George Town, also known as Muthialpet, Parry's Corner and Broadway, is a neighbourhood in Chennai, Tamil Nadu, India. It is near the Fort St. George and is a historical area of Madras city from where its expansion began in the 1640s. It extends from the Bay of Bengal in the east to Park town on the west, The Fort St. George on the south to Royapuram in the north. The Fort St. George houses the Tamil Nadu Legislative Assembly and the Secretariat. The High court of Tamil Nadu at Chennai, Dr. Ambedkar Law College, Stanley Medical College and Hospital are located here.

== History ==
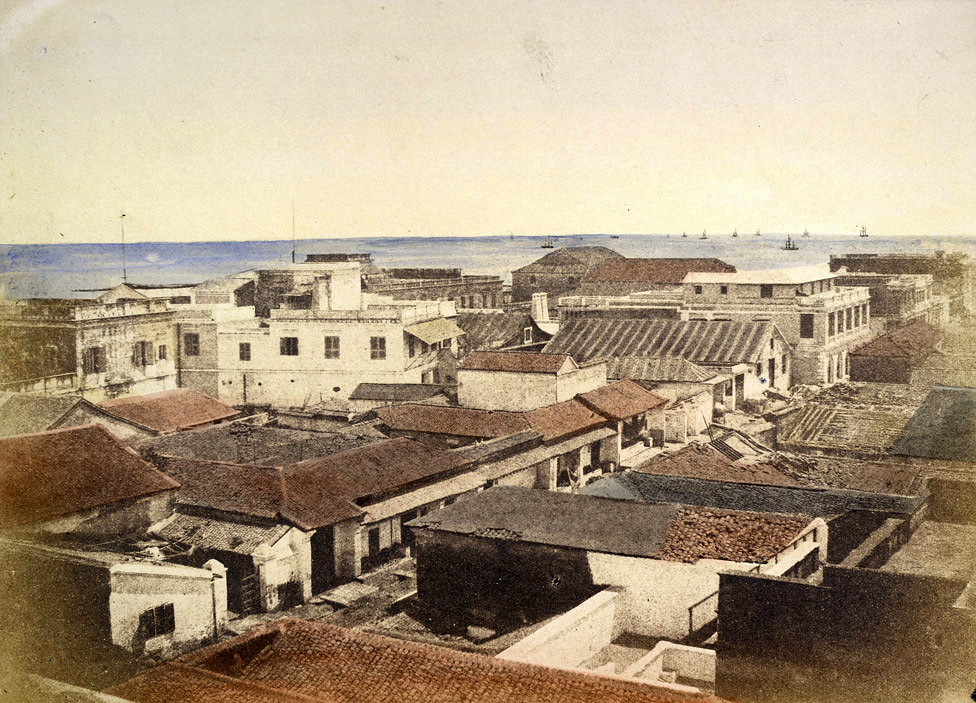
Black Town around 1851

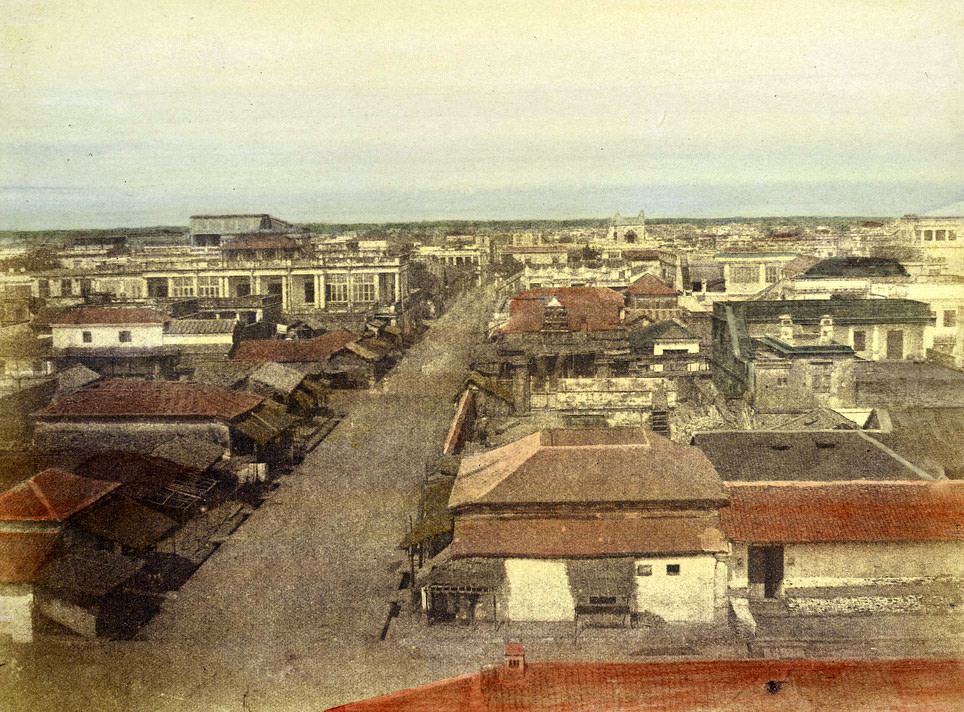
Black Town around 1851

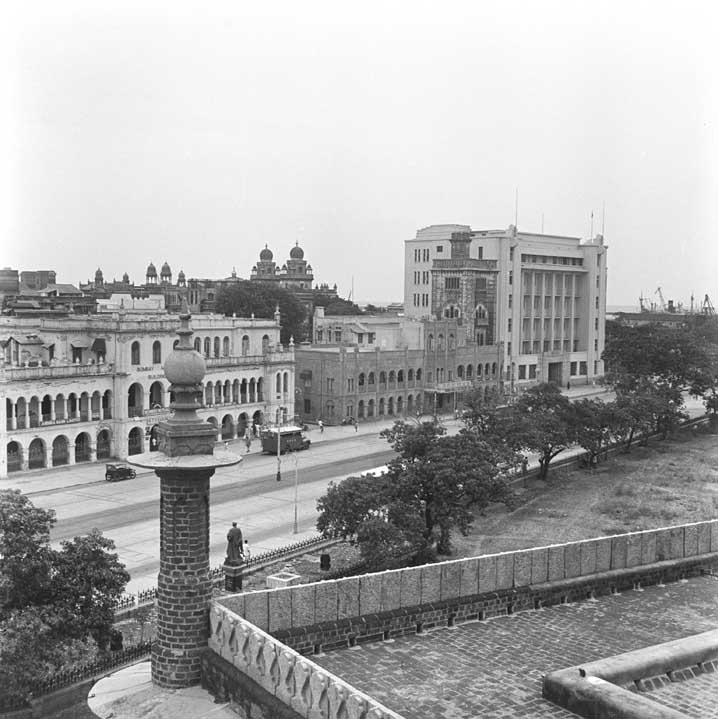
An aerial view of N.S.C. Bose road, leading to 'Parry' Corner

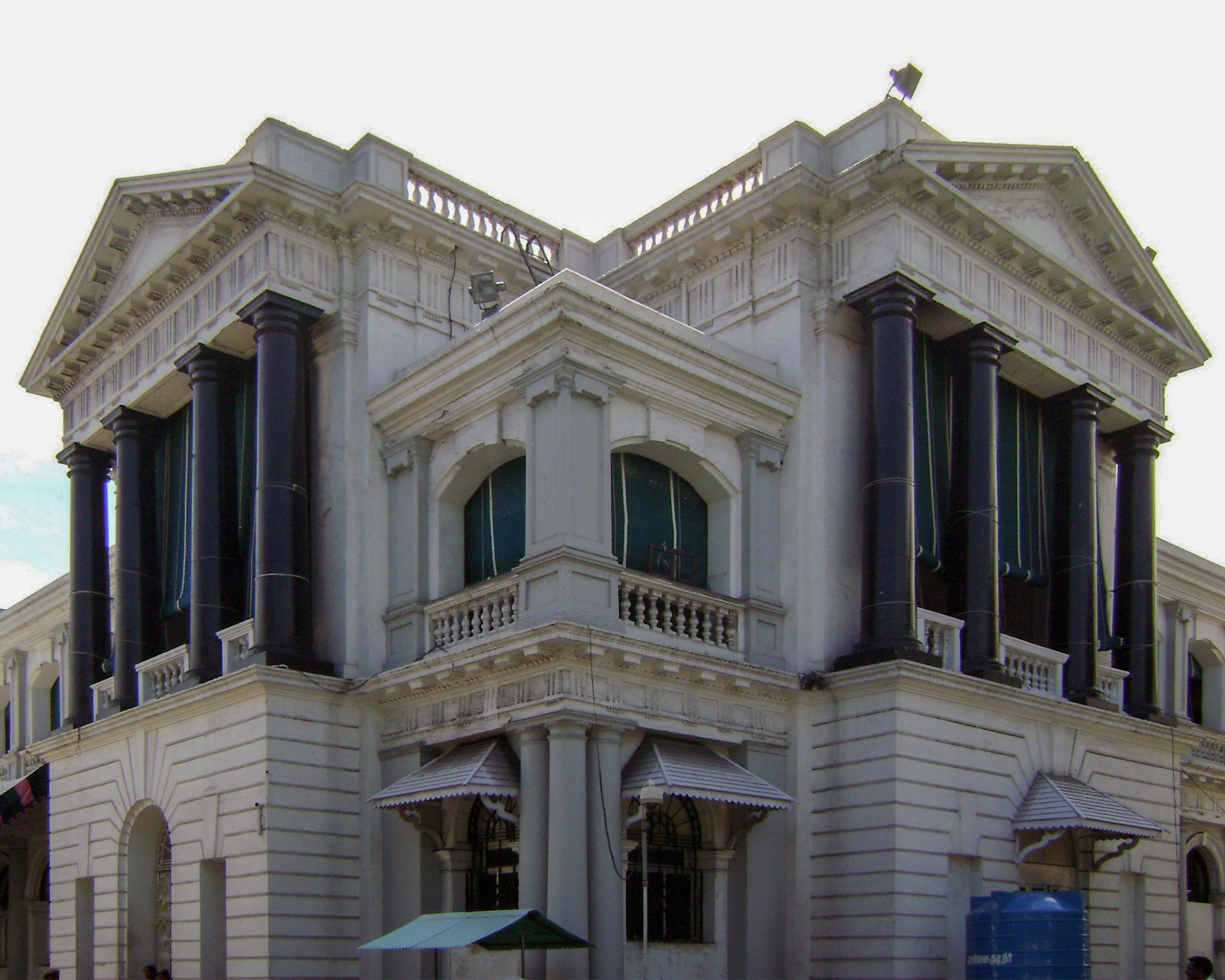
Fort St. George, Tamil Nadu's Legislative Assembly and the Secretariat.

During the colonial period, the area in and around Muthialpet was renamed as "George Town" by the British in 1911, in honour of King George V when he was crowned as the Emperor of India. George Town is one of the names used for Muthialpet. It has the landmark 'Parry building', after which the locality is called 'Parry's Corner'. The area is also called Broadway, named after a main thoroughfare in Muthialpet.

The first settlement of the city of Madras began here, near the fort. Fort St George began in 1640 as a fortified warehouse for the English East India Company. It was built by Francis Day. The township of native people that began to grow up around it was called the Black Town by the British. As the city grew, this area became the base for development and construction activities, meeting the needs of people for their livelihood and rulers' administrative comforts. With the construction of one of India's major ports in the area, Madras became an important naval base for the British.

By the early 18th century, growing population and commercial activities resulted in expansion to neighbouring areas. In 1733, the weaving community started to settle down in Chintadripet and Collepetta near Tiruvottiyur, since abundant open space was available for weaving. The community of washermen in the Mint area then moved towards the west, forming the present Washermanpet. Potters from this area moved outside the Fort on the north side and formed a new colony named Kosapet. With the construction of a bridge in 1710 to connect Egmore, people started moving towards the present Moore Market area.

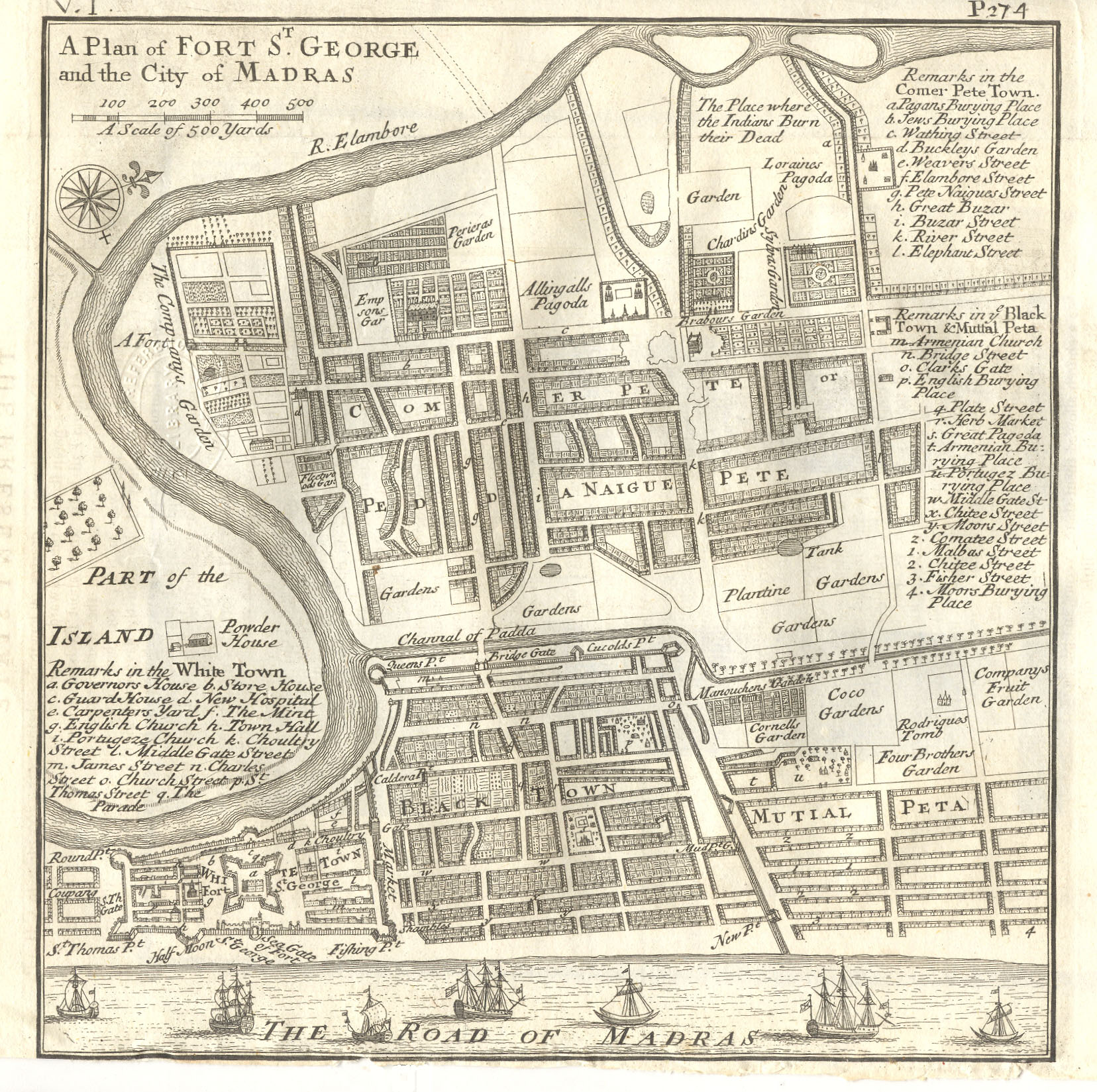
Plan of Fort St George and the city of Madras in 1726.

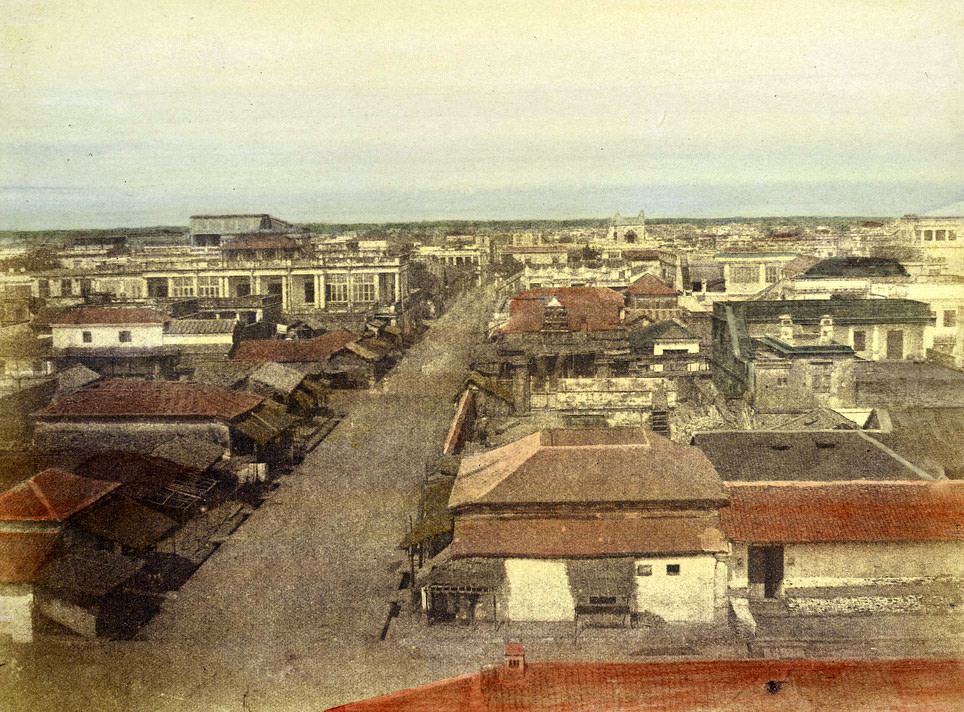
Hand-coloured photograph of Black Town taken in c.1851 by Frederick Fiebig.

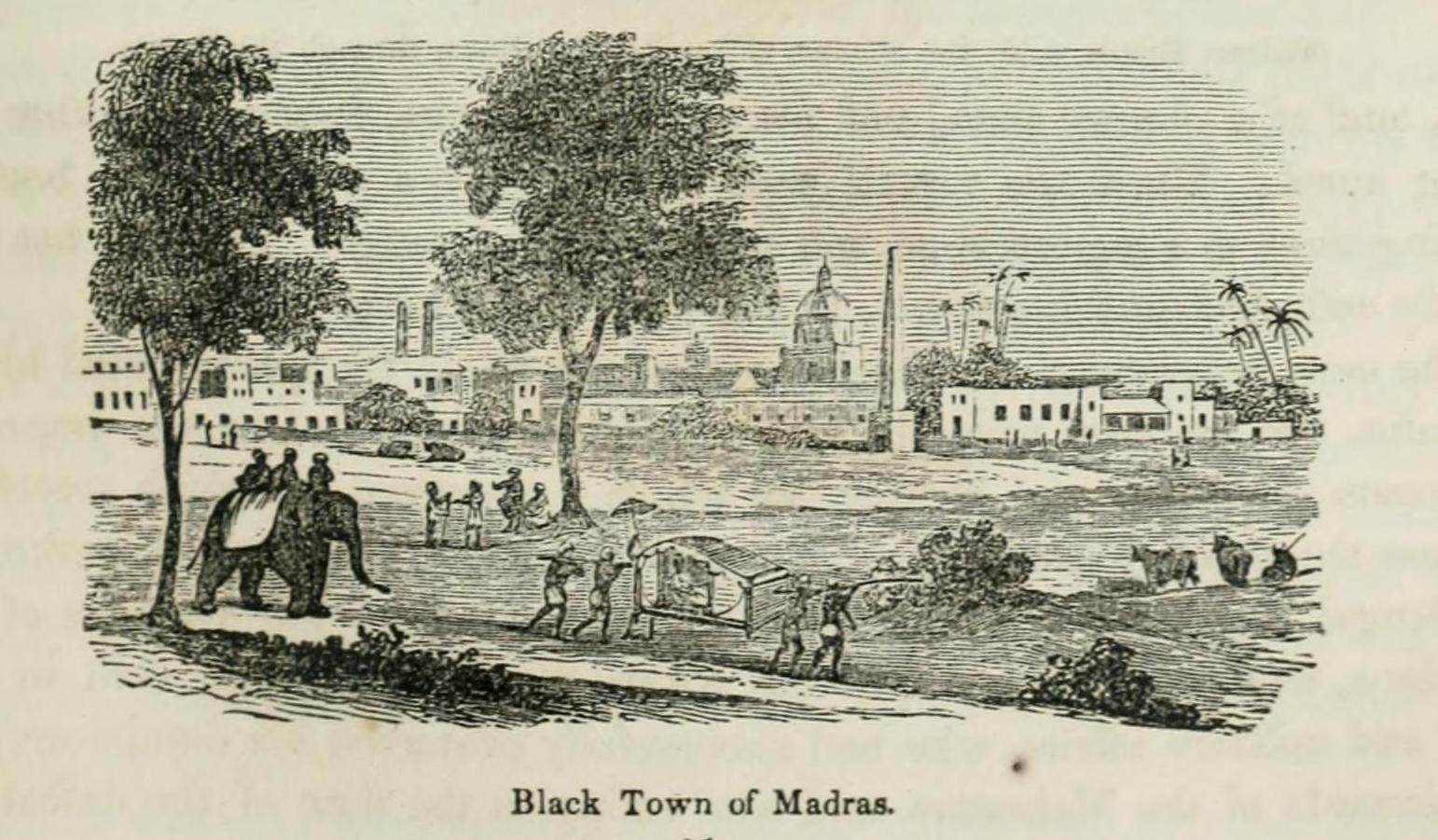
Painting titled 'Black town of Madras' by Sears, Robert (1810-1892).

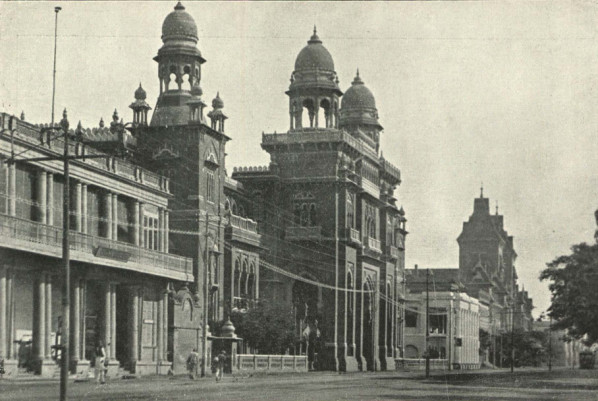
The Bank of Madras, c. 1900.

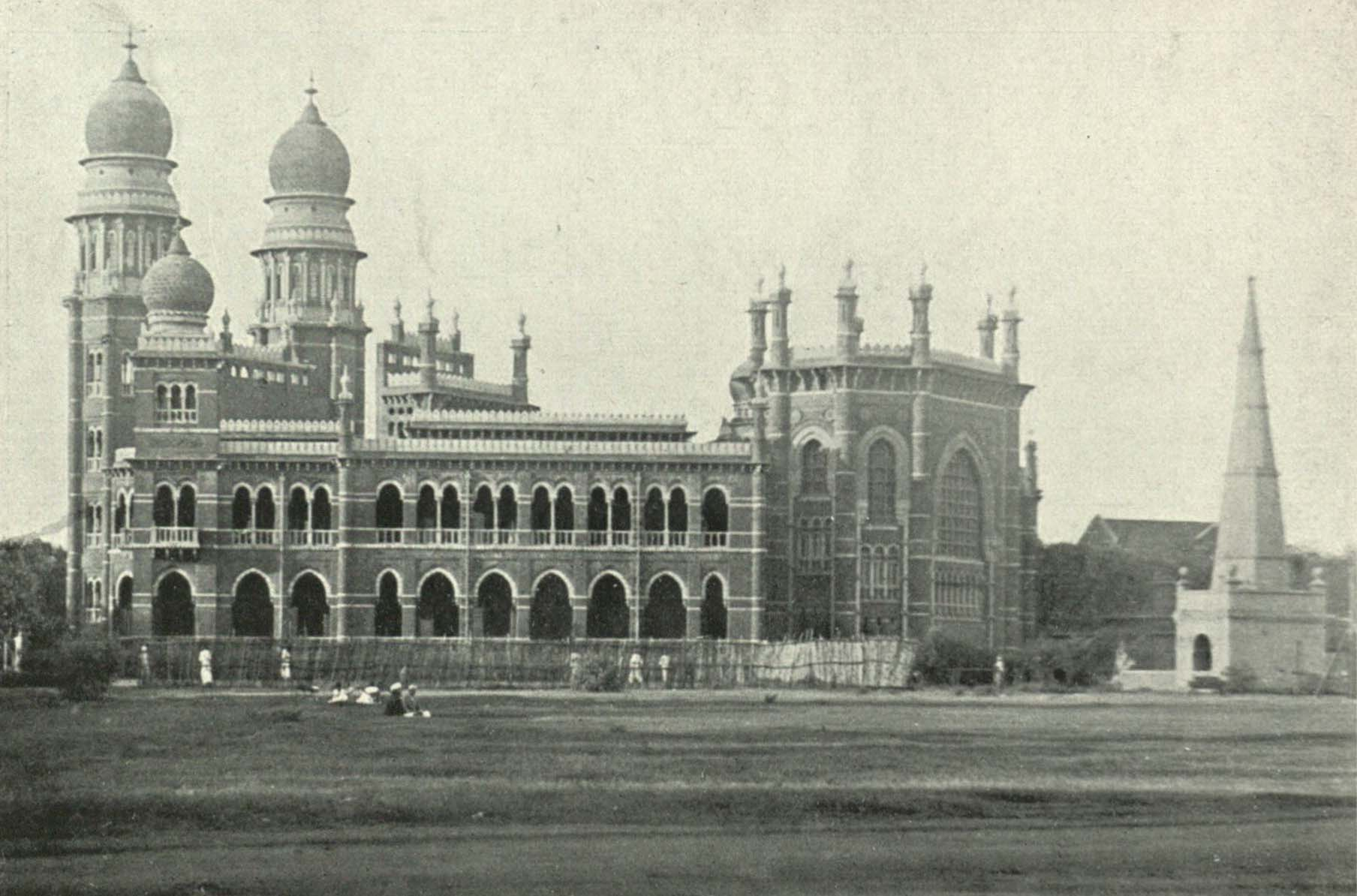
The Law College at George Town, c. 1905.

When the French occupied Madras in 1746 and returned it to the English in 1749 in exchange for Quebec by the Treaty of Aix-la-Chapelle, the English flattened a part of Black Town in order to have a clear field for fire in the event of a future attack. In 1773, the English erected 13 pillars along the flattened area of the Black Town and banned construction in any form between the pillars and the fort which would otherwise block the view of possible invaders. Soon a new township, known as the new Black Town, came up beyond these pillars and the old Black Town gave way to the Madras High Court. A thoroughfare was formed along the stretch between the pillars and the high court which later became the China Bazaar Road. The only surviving one of the 13 pillars is being maintained in the compound of the Parry's building.

In 1772, the first organised water supply of Madras began with the Seven Wells Scheme. On one occasion, Mysore ruler Hyder Ali's troops even tried to poison the water source one night.

In the following centuries, High Court buildings and first light house tower with architectural beauty came up in an area where an old Hindu temple of Sri Chenna Kesava perumal and Chenna Malleswara swamy existed. This temple was demolished and later shifted to the present place near Mint Street on Nethaji Subhash Chandra Bose Road and is popular amongst Hindus as Pattanam Koil.

Several Tamil refugees from Burma, who fled Myanmar during the early sixties, arrived in George Town. In 1969, the Burma Bazaar, a market selling imported foreign goods in shops on pavements, was established by these Burmese refugees-turned-entrepreneurs.

=== Religions and holy shrines ===
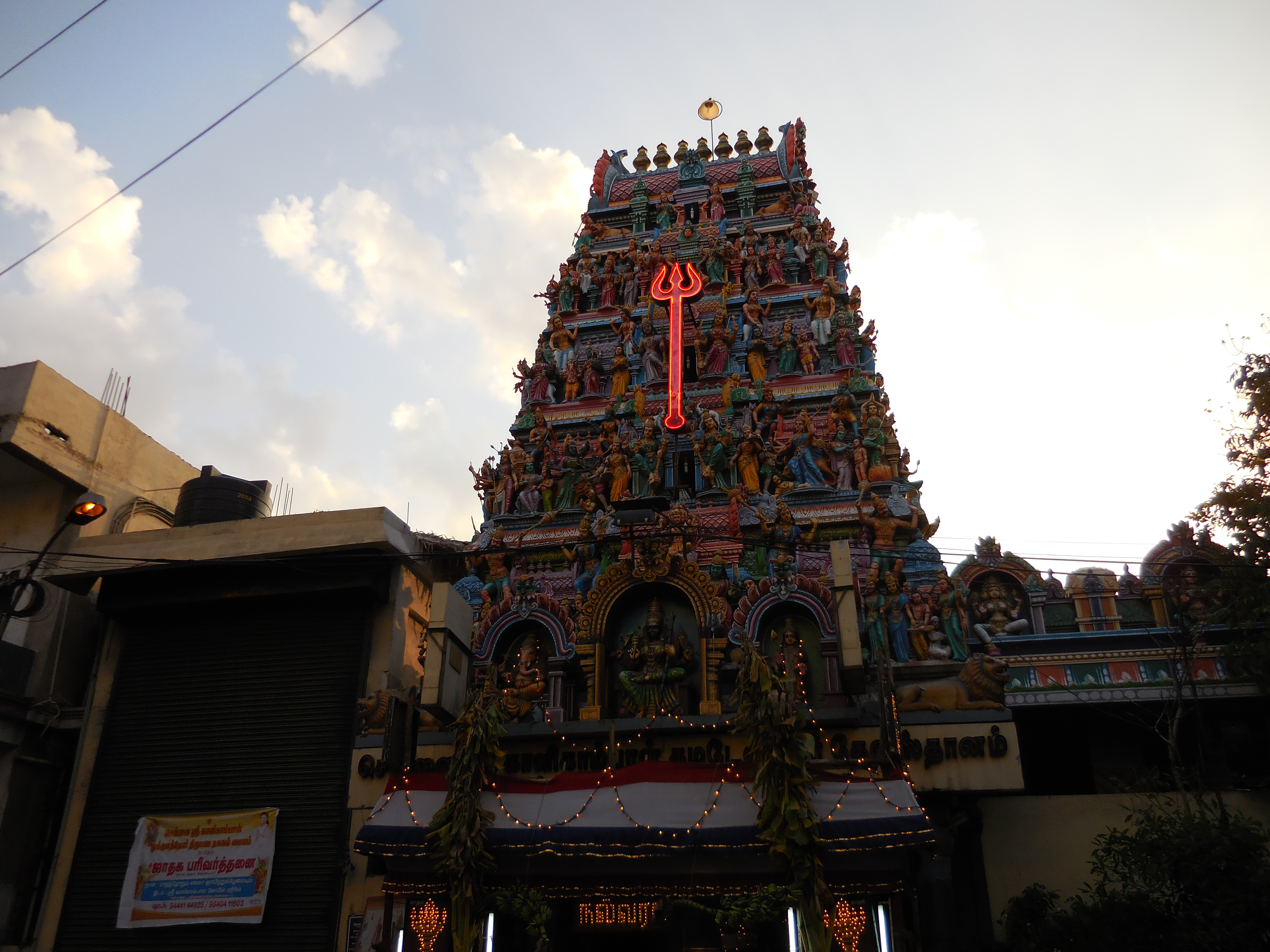
Kāligāmbāl Temple's Gopuram (Gateway tower) entrance. The Marāthi, Chatrapathi Shivāji is said to have visited this temple.

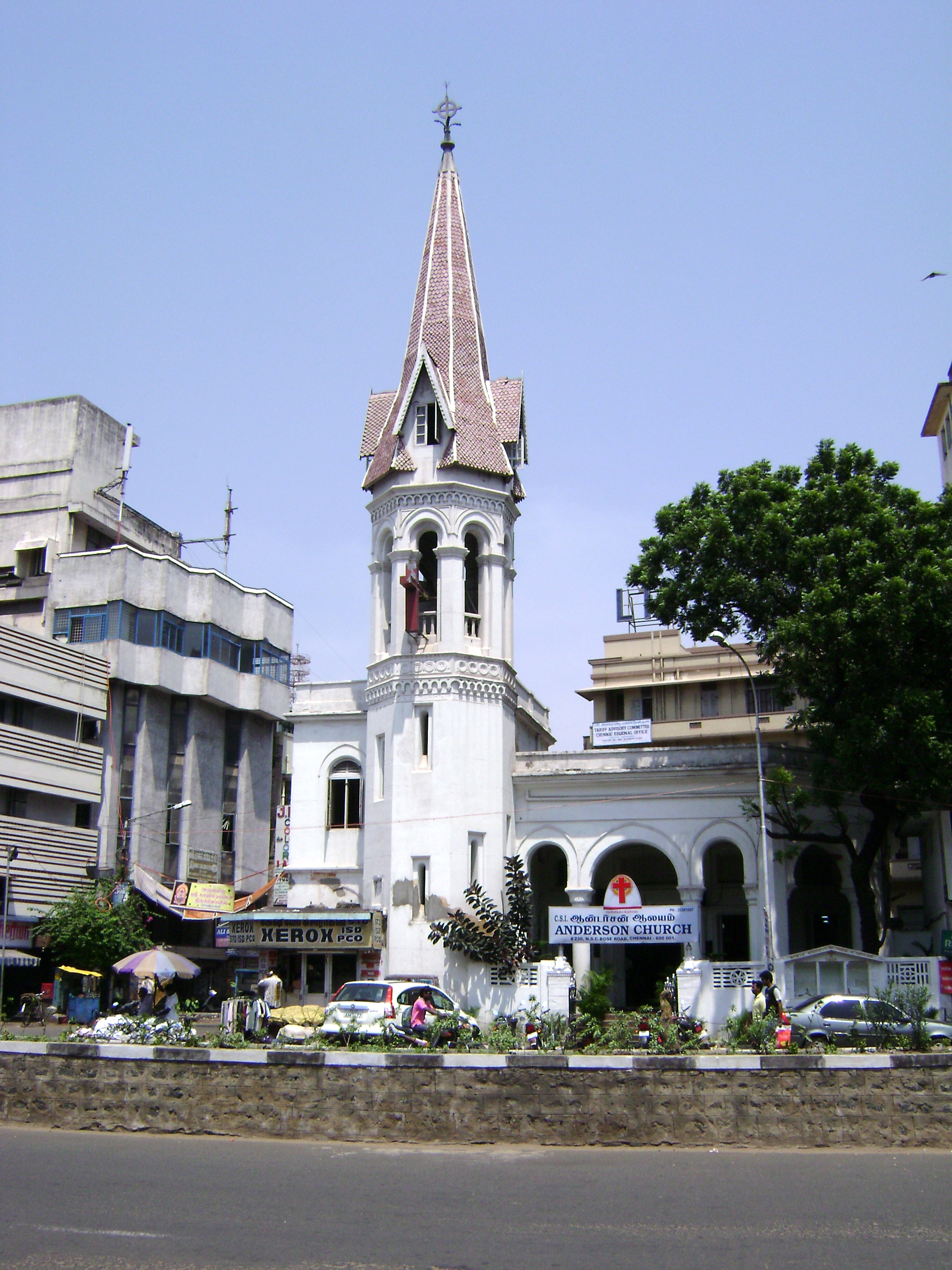
Anderson Church near Madras High court.

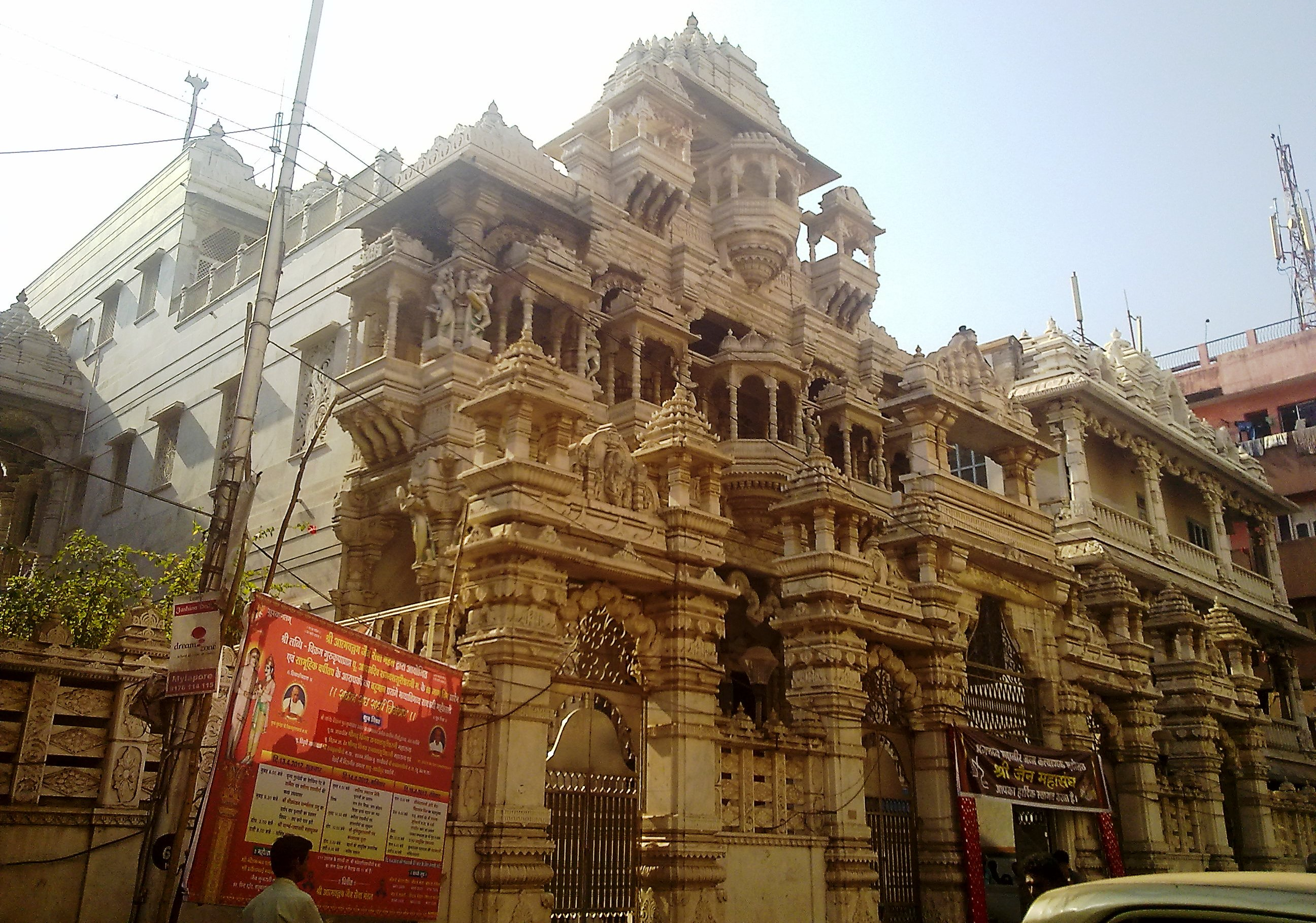
Shri Chandraprabhu Jain temple

George Town has a rich congregation of shrines of different faiths within its boundaries. The first Hindu temples of British Madras were built in this neighbourhood between 1640 and 1680. Many of the temples were built since then by the leading merchants of the city, mostly dubashes (middlemen) of British merchants and business establishments. Several of the streets in the neighbourhood are named after these dubashes.

The city's first Jain temples were built in the central part of the western half of the neighbourhood occupied by settlers from Rajasthan and Saurashtra, now known as Sowcarpet. Today, festivals such as Holi, Diwali, and Ganesh Chathurthi are celebrated in the North Indian style.

The first mosque in the neighbourhood was built in the 1670s on Moor Street. The mosque, however, does not exist today. The oldest surviving mosque is the huge Masjid Mamoor in Angappa Naicken Street, which was built in the eighteenth century.

The first Madras Synagogue was built in Coral Merchant Street, which had a large presence of Portuguese Paradesi Jews in the sixteenth, seventeenth and eighteenth centuries. The Madras Synagogue does not exist today.

The oldest church is the Armenian Church on Armenian Street. The Cathedral of St Mary of the Angels located next to the church has its presence since 1642. However, the first Catholic place of worship in the neighbourhood was built before the St. Mary's cathedral. Protestant churches, however, were built only in the nineteenth century, with the first English Protestant Church built in 1810 on Davidson Street.

The Muthialpet area, the western part of George Town extending northwards from the Madras High Court, is one of the 163 notified areas (megalithic sites) in the state of Tamil Nadu.

== Demographics ==
Residents of George Town in earlier days were mainly Telugus with sizable population of Tamils. A major part of trade and business was in the hands of Telugus. Apart from locals, people from other parts of the country as well as foreign nationals who had trade and business links with the East India Company were living in this area. Many of the streets bear the name of the business that people in the locality were engaged in. Men who were doing business in corals lived together in Coral Merchants Street, and people from Armenia doing business with the English were living in Armenian Street. A church called Armenian Church was also constructed in the same area for them. As the town was developing manifold, people from all over India settled here doing business in all fields, chiefly from Rajasthan, Gujarat, Maharashtra and Uttar Pradesh. The area occupied by the North Indians, chiefly Marwaris from Rajasthan and Gujarat, in the twentieth century came to be known as Sowcarpet (literally 'area of the rich', derived from the word 'sahukar' meaning money lender in Hindi).

== Geography ==
George Town extends roughly from Chennai Central railway station and People's Park in the west to the Bay of Bengal in the east. To the north is Basin Bridge and Royapuram while Fort St George bounds it on the south. Broadway, originally Popham's Broadway, and officially Prakasam Salai, divided George Town into two portions, the eastern part of which was historically known as Muthialpet and the western part, Peddanaickenpet.

== Roads and streets ==
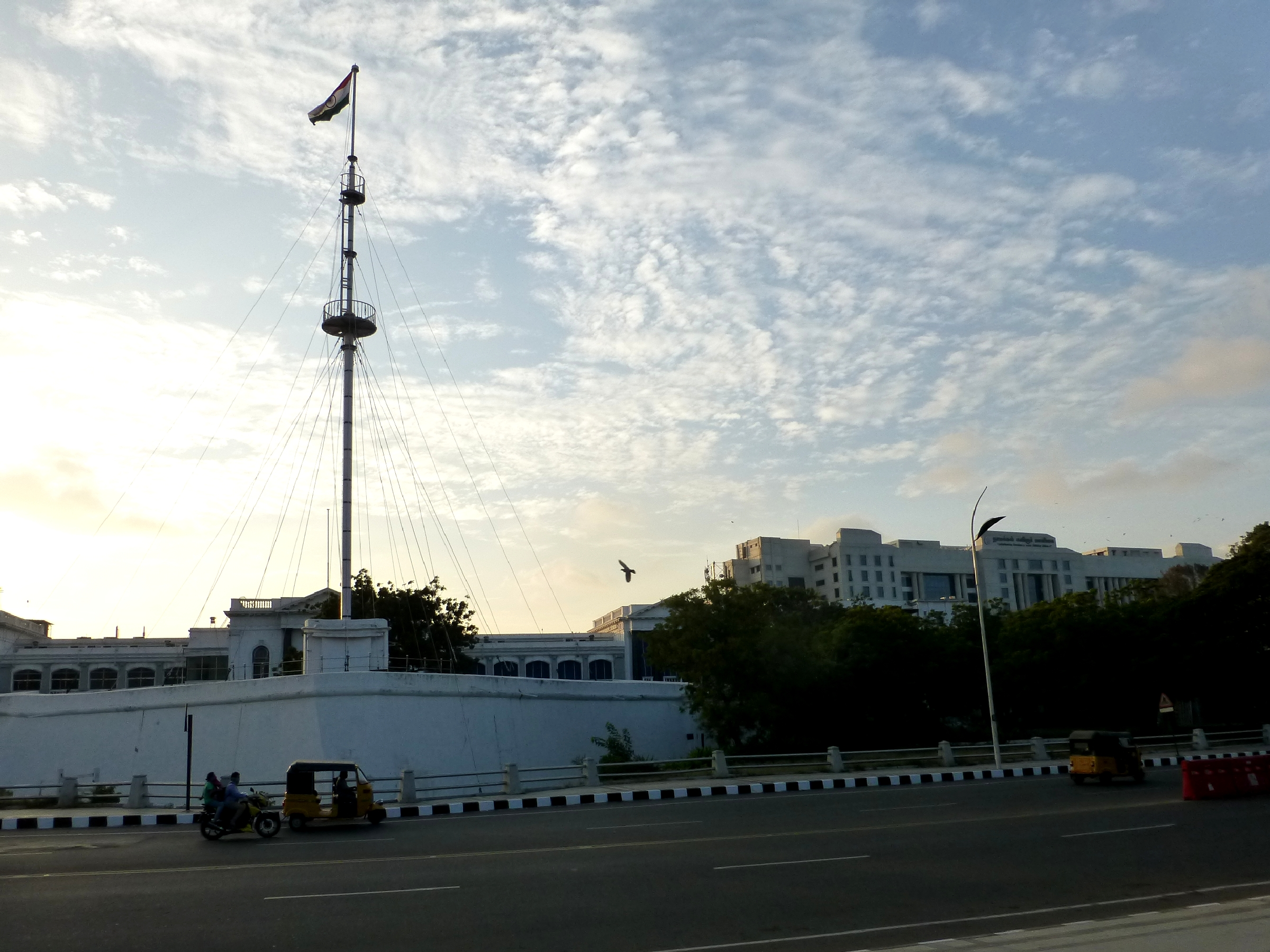
Fort St.George

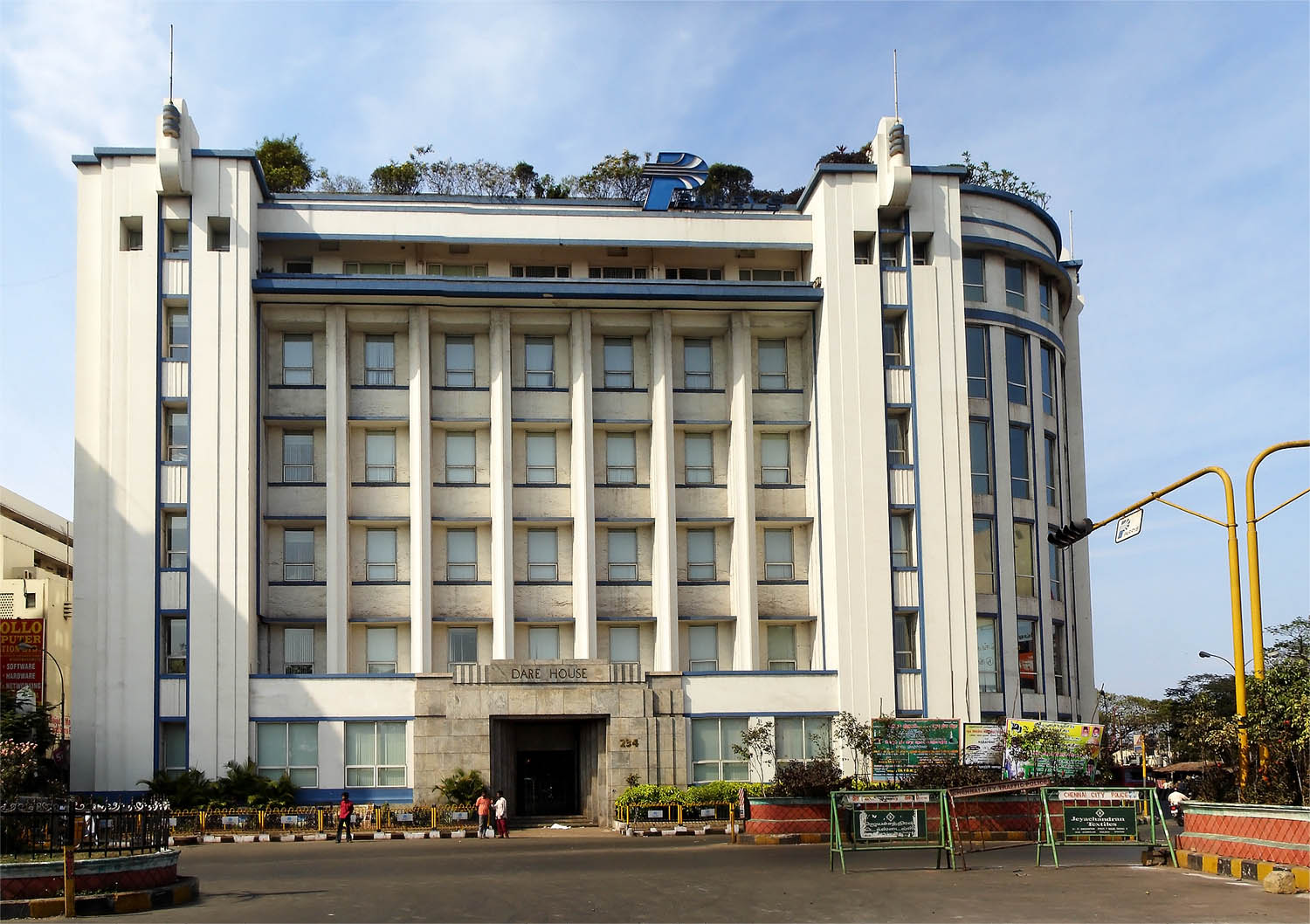
Parry's corner is named after the landmark Parry building of the Murugappa Group, an industrial conglomerate.

Major roads of the neighbourhood include Netaji Subash Chandra Bose Road (popularly known as China Bazaar Road), Rajaji Salai (formerly First Line Beach road) and Wall Tax Road. The streets are generally small and narrow with several lanes branching out of them. The longest street is Mint Street, which starts near Central Railway Station making way across the neighbourhood for about 4 km towards north and ends near Vallalar Nagar. The street derived its name from a mint of the East India Company that existed at the end of this street during the British era. Now the building houses Central Printing Press of Government of Tamil Nadu. This is considered one of few longest streets in the world. Several government offices, both state and central governments, including Andaman & Nicobar Island government's administrative offices of Shipping and Tourism Departments, are located on Rajaji Salai. The very attractive Burma Bazaar, noted for selling electronic goods and other items at cheaper rates, once mostly run by Burmese refugees, is also located on this road.

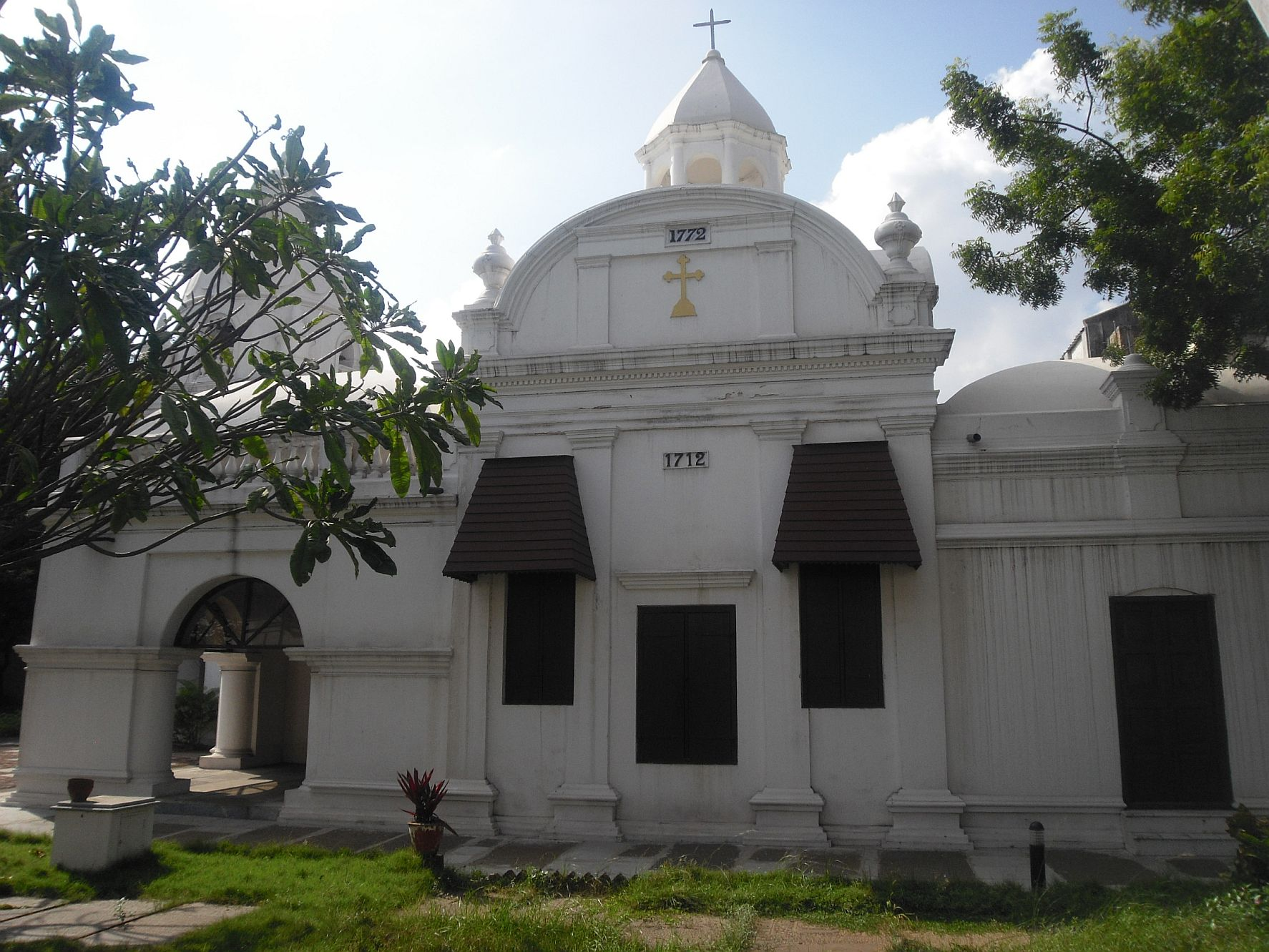
Armenian Church in Armenian Street, Chennai. Marked on the building are years 1712 and 1772.

=== Parry's Corner ===
Parry's Corner
- Neighborhood
- Interactive map of Parry's Corner
- Coordinates: 13.08882°N 80.29038°E
- Country: India
- State: Tamil Nadu
- District: Chennai
- Metro: Chennai

Government
  - Body: CMDA

Languages
  - Official: Tamil
- Time zone: UTC+5:30 (IST)
- PIN: 600001
- Planning agency: CMDA

Parry's Corner (Tamil: பாரி முனை, romanized: Paari Munai) is a locality in George Town. Often referred to as Parry's, it is situated near the Chennai Port, at the intersection of North Beach Road and NSC Bose Road. It is named after Thomas Parry, a Welsh merchant who set up the EID Parry Company in 1787, the corporate headquarters of which stand on the corner.

The place is an important center for commercial banking and trading, and also a major hub for the intracity bus service. It is one of the most congested areas in the city. The area has many popular schools like St. Mary's Anglo-Indian Higher Secondary School, St. Columban's Anglo-Indian Higher Secondary School. The Anderson Church is the oldest and most prominent church in the region.

=== Streets and specialities ===
Several streets in the neighbourhood is known for their dedicated businesses and services. The following table lists some of the streets and the chief services they are known for.

Street name	Speciality
Mannadi Street	Textiles, imported goods, eateries
Moore Street	Cereals and pulses, hotels and lodges
Angappa Naicken Street	Masjid, textile, eateries
Burma Bazaar	Grey market for electronic goods, cameras, luggage, perfumes and accessories
Linghi Chetty Street	Steel hardware, electric motors and pump sets
Thambu Chetty Street	Hardware, ceramic tiles and sanitary ware
Sembudoss Street	Steel sheets and rods, pipes
Broadway	Cycles and optical goods
Anderson Street	Stationery
Godown Street	Textiles
Govindappa Naicken Street	Electrical goods, dry fruits
Nainiappa Naicken Street	Chemicals and surgical instruments, pharma, plywood, glass, laminates, photo frames
Coral Merchant Street	Transport and shipping offices
Savarimuthu Street	Warehouse, storage godowns and toiletries consumables
Evening Bazaar	Household appliances and domestic utensils
Kasi Chetty Street	Imported goods, gift items, toys, perfumes, bags, and novelties
Bunder Street	Fruits, books, stationery and crackers
Badrian Street	Flowers, crackers
Elephant Gate	Textiles, chocolates
Rajaji Salai	Banks, trading offices, shipping corporations

== Architecture ==
Being one of the oldest settlements in the modern city of Chennai, George Town remains a classic example of a confluence of different architectural styles. The neighbourhood is known for several classic styles of buildings such as Indo-Saracenic, Neoclassical, Gothic, and Art Deco, apart from several traditional vernacular styles. Each building presents its uniqueness in its architectural character. Dare House in Parrys Corner, an Art Deco–style building, for instance, sports an emphasis on vertical lines and a distinct design of a 'sunburst jaali' for ventilation.

== Buildings and landmarks ==
This area has many heritage and modern buildings on Rajaji salai and NSC Bose Road. Heritage buildings include the High Court Buildings, the Old Lighthouse Tower and the Law College building at Parry's Corner and the GPO building and Reserve Bank of India Building on Rajaji Salai. Other modern buildings are Parry's Dare House, the State Bank of Mysore Building, the New Collectorate Office Building (Singaravelar Maaligai), Kuralagam, and the BSNL office buildings. Raja Annamalai Mandram is a big hall where indoor meetings, cultural activities and dramas are held. In addition, there are lot of buildings owned by business community and government.

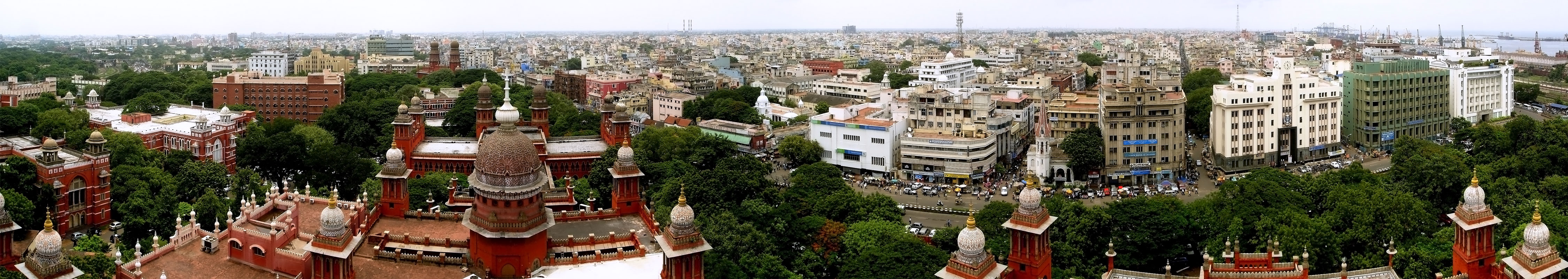
Panoramic view of the Chennai High Court and its surroundings

== Land use ==
The land use in George Town primarily comprises residential and mixed-residential zones. It is classified as a 'continuous building area', permitting structures of ground-plus-one floor, with a floor space index of 1.5. As of 2014, the business district has more than 14,000 buildings with around 25,000 property tax assessees.

All buildings in George Town have been found in violation of development regulations, with several buildings found to have been constructed without obtaining building approval from the corporation.

== Economy ==
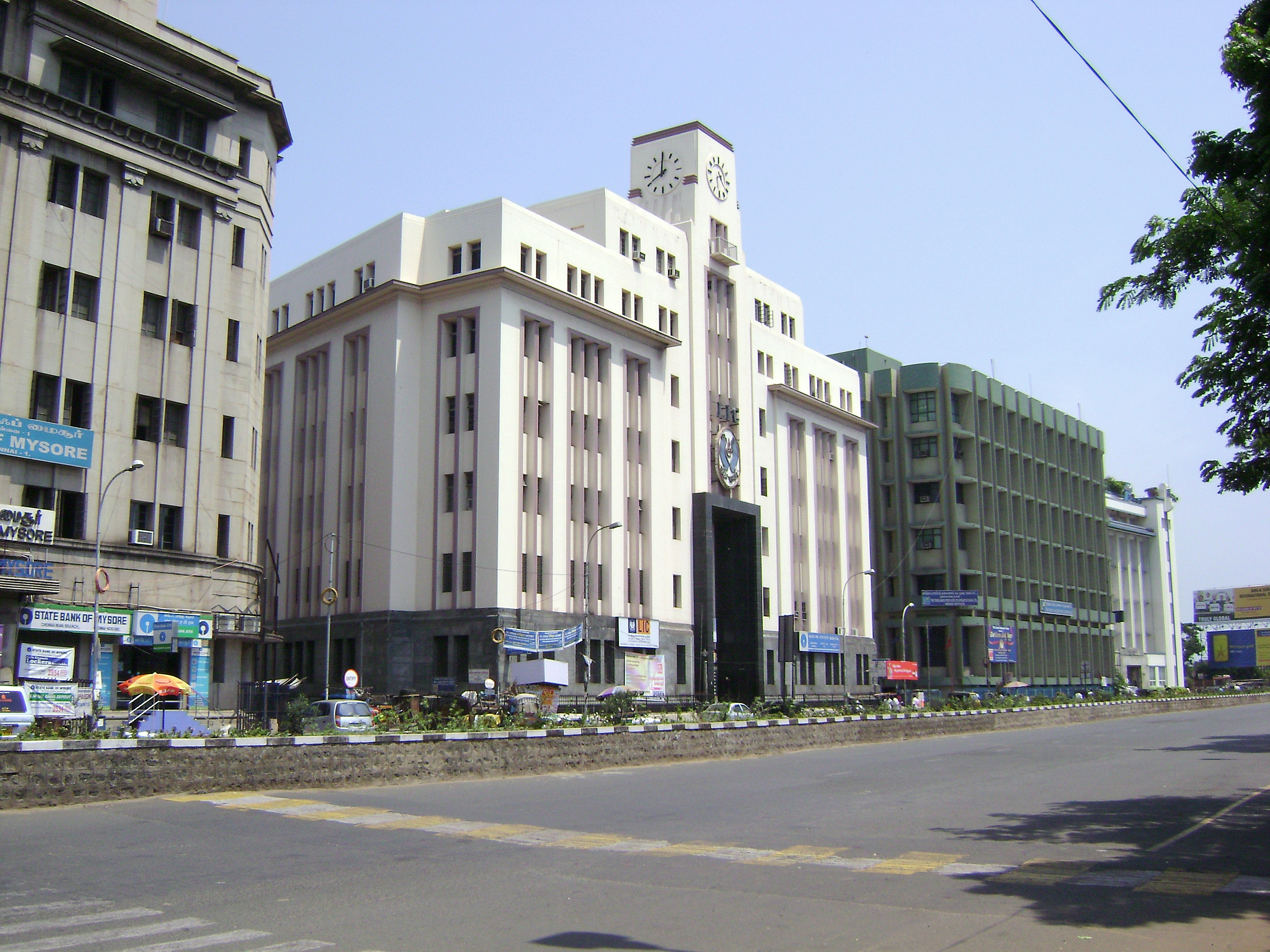
Commercial buildings at Parry's Corner, Chennai

George Town is the birthplace of the economy of the city that began to flourish in the 17th century. Being the primary neighbourhood of the then burgeoning city of Madras, George Town houses several commercial establishments of national importance. It long housed the central business district of the city, until the 1960s, when it began to drift towards the south to reach the Gemini circle.

=== Banking ===
The neighbourhood and the surrounding areas were home to several Nattukottai Chettiars or Nagarathars, who offered banking services to the public in the city before the establishment of modern commercial banks. They both offered loans to and accepted money deposits from the public, besides offering loans to the agricultural labourers. Several banking and financial offices were housed in heritage structures from the Colonial era, clustered chiefly around North Beach Road, many of which continue to exist to the present day.

The first European-style banking system in India was started in George Town with the establishment of the 'Madras Bank' on 21 June 1683, almost a century before the establishment of the first commercial banks, such as the Bank of Hindustan and the General Bank of India, which were established in 1770 and 1786, respectively. However, the bank proved a failure. Upon the recommendation of the British Finance Committee on the formation of a government bank, the Madras Bank, then known as the 'Government Bank', started functioning again from 1806. In 1843, the bank merged with the Carnatic Bank (1788), the British Bank of Madras (1795) and the Asiatic Bank (1804) and became the Bank of Madras, which was one of the three Presidency banks of India. In 1921, it merged with the other two Presidency banks, namely the Bank of Bengal and the Bank of Bombay, to form the Imperial Bank of India, which later became the State Bank of India in 1955. The neighbourhood is also home to the south zonal office of the Reserve Bank of India, the country's central bank.

== Transportation ==
George Town remains the geographical and geometrical focal point of Chennai where all the radial roads and railroads of the city converge. The arterial roads, namely, North and South Beach Roads, Anna Salai, Poonamallee High Road, Grand Northern Trunk Road, and Ennore High Road radiate from the neighbourhood, and both the primary terminal railway stations of the city, namely, Chennai Central and Chennai Beach borders the western and eastern sides of the neighbourhood. In addition to the two terminal stations, many suburban railway stations are located circumferentially around the neighbourhood, namely, Chennai Central Suburban, Chennai Fort, Chennai Park and Park Town, all located in the south and southwest fringes, Basin Bridge Junction at the western fringe, and Royapuram railway station at the northern fringe. The neighbourhood has a bus terminus, the Broadway Bus Stand near Parry's Corner.

The intercity and interstate express bus terminus originally functioned at the Broadway terminus near Madras High Court in an area covering about 1.5 acres. With increasing transportation needs, the terminus was shifted to the new premises covering 36.5 acres at Koyambedu in 2002 constructed at a cost of ₹ 1,030 million.

In January 2013, further to the public interest litigation petition filed in the court, the Corporation decided to improve the Broadway bus terminus at an estimated cost of ₹ 33.6 million.

== Education ==
=== Colleges and universities ===
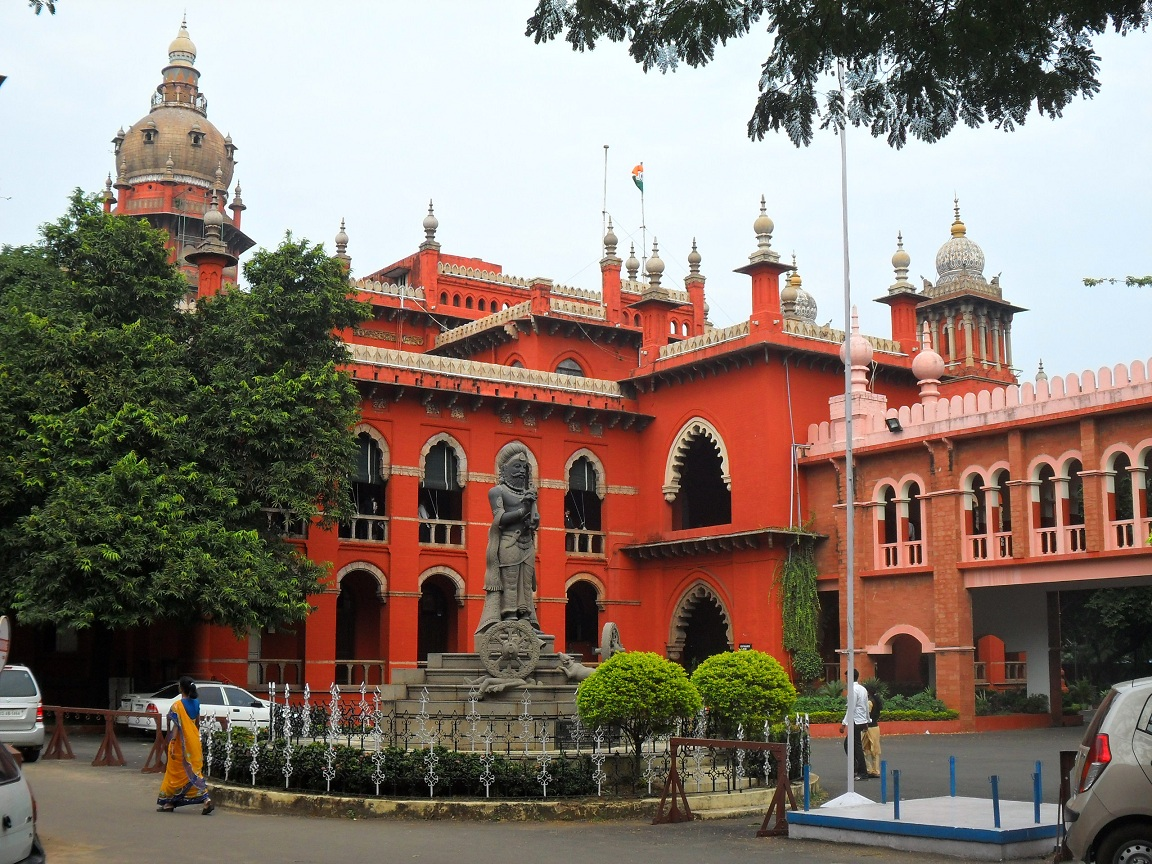
Chennai High court building with statue of Manu Needhi Cholan in the foreground. Also housed here is the Dr. Ambedkar Law College, Chennai.

George Town is home to various government-run colleges and institutions. Dr. Ambedkar Law College, initially known as Madras Law College, was established in 1891. The medical college of the Government Stanley Medical College and Hospital was established in 1938 although the hospital was established by the turn of the 19th century. The Government Dental College and Hospital was established in 1953. Bharathi Women's College is located in the northern side of the neighbourhood.

=== Primary and secondary schools ===
It has many premier schools which includes St. Mary's Anglo-Indian Higher Secondary School, St Francis Xavier Anglo-Indian Hr secondary school, St. Columban's Anglo-Indian Higher Secondary School and other schools including The Muthialpet Higher Secondary School, St.Gabriel's Higher Secondary School, Ramiah Girls High School, MEASI Matriculation Higher Secondary School, Muthialpet Girls School, Bishop Corrie Higher Secondary School and Dominic Savio School.

== Developments ==
Although George Town is the origin of the modern city of Chennai and remained the chief commercial hub of the city till the early 20th century, the city's central business district gradually moved towards the south since the mid-20th century, presently lying at the Gemini Circle on Anna Salai. This resulted in paucity of development funds for the northern region of the city. However, some of the community-specific areas of George Town, such as Sowcarpet where the prosperous Marwari community resides, still remains an important commercial hub of the city.

== Political awareness ==
Political awareness among citizens of George Town is high. Leaders of national and state political parties have held street meetings contacting people and propagating their aims and principles, including C. N. Annadurai, K. Kamaraj, C. Rajagopalachary, E. V. K. Ramaswamy Naicker, M. P. Sivagnanam (Ma. Po. Si),. Prakasam, Mahatma Gandhi, and Annie Besant. In part due to the large immigrant population, there is awareness of the politics of other states and nations in addition to local and state politics. The DMK party, one of the chief political parties of Tamil Nadu, counts Coral Merchant Street as its birthplace in 1949.

== See also ==
- Timeline of Chennai history
- History of Chennai
- Peddanaickenpettah
