= Rajaji Salai, Chennai =

Road in Chennai, India

Rajaji Salai
- North Beach Rd, First Line Beach Rd
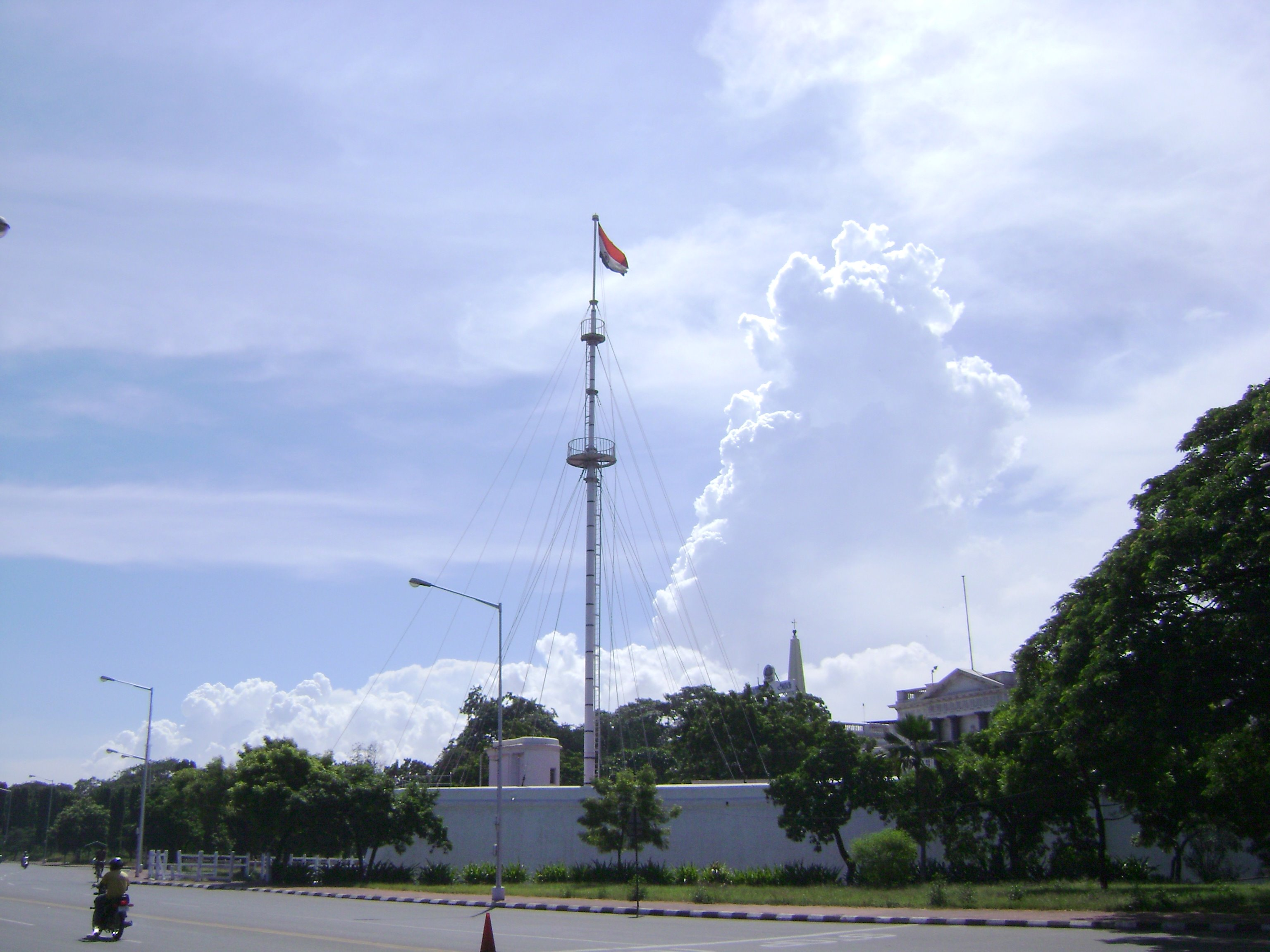
- Rajaji Salai near the entrance of Fort St. George
- Interactive map of Rajaji Salai
- Maintained by: Corporation of Chennai
- Coordinates: 13°05′14″N 80°17′15″E

Rajaji Salai, also known as North Beach Road or First Line Beach is an arterial road of Chennai, India. Starting from the junction with Ennore Expressway at the Kasimedu fishing harbour, the road runs through Royapuram and the entire length of Chennai Harbour and after passing through the Central Business District of Georgetown, merges with Mount Road on The Island. The road which runs from Sivananda Salai southwards along Marina Beach to Foreshore Estate has been named South Beach Road (Kamaraj Salai) to distinguish it from the North Beach Road.

== Road Junctions ==
- Ebrahim Sahib Street Junction
- Parry's Corner Junction
- Rajah Annamalai Chettiar Hall junction
- Pallavan Salai junction

== Suburban railway stations ==
- Royapuram railway station
- Chennai Beach railway station
- Chennai Fort railway station

== Landmarks ==
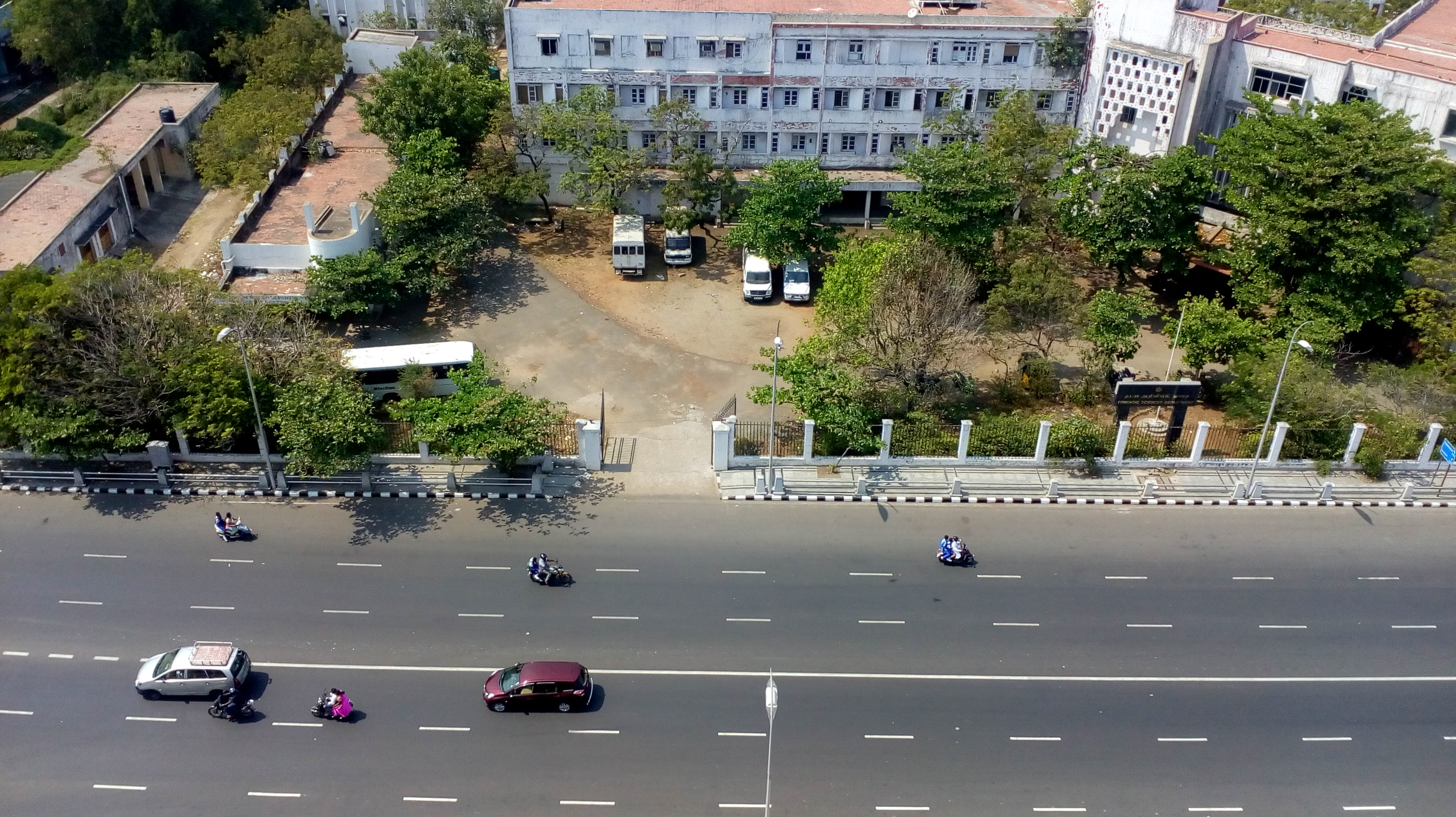
Rajaji Salai in 2017

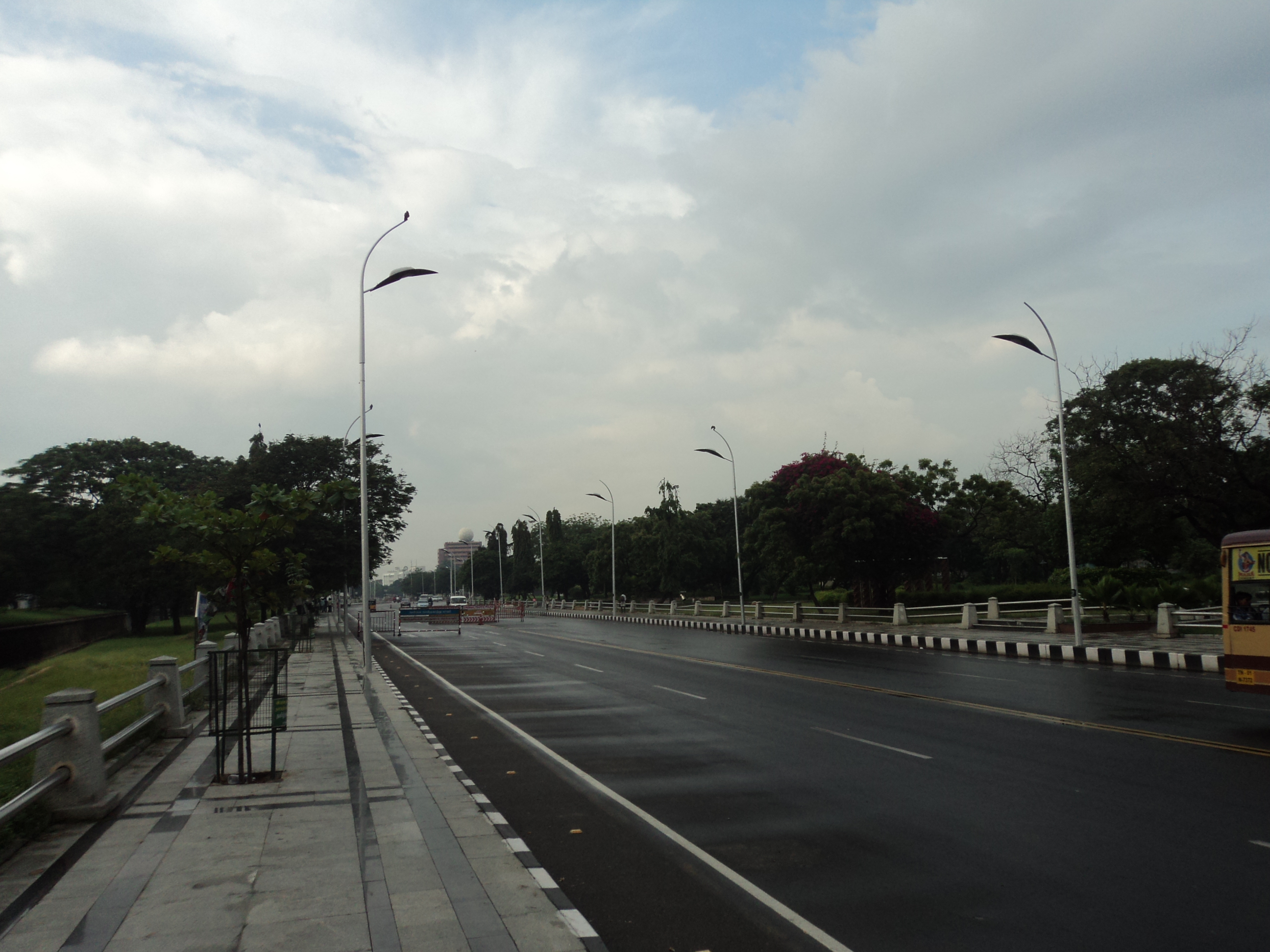
Rajaji Salai towards north

Once the seat of power, Rajaji Salai still retains its importance with several important buildings, including Fort St. George, Chennai Port Trust, Reserve Bank of India, Chennai District Collectorate and the Madras High Court. Halfway towards the south, the road borders the eastern end of China Bazaar Road, marking one of the most famous junctions of the city, the Parry's Corner. More historical and heritage buildings are located on important streets around Rajaji Salai, such as the Armenian Church, the Anderson Church, the Gokhale Hall, the State Bank of India local head office, Dare House and the Collectorate Building. During the regime of former Chief Minister K. Kamaraj, the present subway on Rajaji Salai was constructed, replacing the level crossing between Chennai Beach and Chennai Fort stations.

== See also ==
- Parry's Corner
- George Town
- Transport in Chennai
- History of Chennai

== Bibliography ==
- Muthiah, S. (1981). Madras Discovered. East West Books (Madras) Pvt Ltd. p. 124.
