= Moolakothalam =

- Neighbourhood
- Moolakothalam (Chennai)
- Coordinates: 13.107000°N 80.273800°E
- Country: India
- State: Tamil Nadu
- District: Chennai district
- Elevation: 29 m (95 ft)

Languages
  - Official: Tamil, English
  - Speech: Tamil, English
- Time zone: UTC+5:30 (IST)
- PIN: 600021
- Telephone Code: +9144xxxxxxxx
- Neighbourhoods: George Town, Royapuram, Kondithope, Mannadi Vannarapettai, Tondiarpet, Sowcarpet, Vallalar Nagar, Basin bridge and Kasimedu
- Corporation: Greater Chennai Corporation
- District Collector: Tmt. S. Amirtha Jothi, I. A. S.
- LS: Chennai Central Lok Sabha constituency
- VS: Harbour Assembly constituency
- MP: Dayanidhi Maran
- MLA: P. K. Sekar Babu
- Website: https://chennaicorporation.gov.in

Moolakothalam is a neighbourhood in Chennai district of Tamil Nadu state in the peninsular India. Moolakothalam has a dry fish market which functions for more than 50 years.

Moolakothalam is located at an altitude of about m above the mean sea level with the geographical coordinates of 13.107000°N 80.273800°E.

There is a 120-year-old burial ground in Moolakothalam. The burial ground is a historical site of the final resting place of anti-Hindi agitation leaders viz., Natarajan and Thalamuthu. Also, there is a memorial erected, for social activist cum reformer S. Dharmambal, in Moolakothalam. The surface area of this burial ground is of 20 acres. There is a proposal of State Government of Tamil Nadu, to construct a multi-storey apartment complex near the burial ground of Moolakothalam, for the welfare of Adi-dravida people living there. Tamil Nadu Slum Clearance board makes necessary steps to acquire a part of the burial ground here for this purpose, even though some political parties such as MDMK, CPM and VCK, oppose this. The project cost of the proposed 1,044 dwelling units to be built with all modern amenities, is estimated to about ₹138.29 crore. Murthy Vinayagar Temple located in Moolakothalam is under the control of Hindu Religious and Charitable Endowments Department, Government of Tamil Nadu.
