= Elephant Gate =

- Neighbourhood
- Elephant Gate (Chennai)
- Coordinates: 13°05′28.8″N 80°16′42.5″E
- Country: India
- State: Tamil Nadu
- District: Chennai district
- Elevation: 33 m (108 ft)

Languages
  - Official: Tamil, English
  - Speech: Tamil, English
- Time zone: UTC+5:30 (IST)
- PIN: 600079
- Telephone Code: +9144xxxxxxxx
- Neighbourhoods: George Town, Royapuram, Kondithope, Mannadi Vannarapettai, Tondiarpet, Sowcarpet, Vallalar Nagar, Basin bridge and Kasimedu
- Website: https://chennaicorporation.gov.in

Elephant Gate is a neighbourhood in Chennai district of Tamil Nadu state in the peninsular India. It is located at an altitude of about 33 m above the mean sea level with the geographical coordinates of 13°05′28.8″N 80°16′42.5″E (i.e., 13.091345°N, 80.278475°E). George Town, Royapuram, Kondithope, Mannadi Vannarapettai, Tondiarpet, Sowcarpet, Vallalar Nagar, Basin bridge and Kasimedu are some of the important neighbourhoods of Elephant Gate. Elephant Gate is one of the areas where the former Chief Minister of Tamil Nadu, K. Kamaraj, delivered a speech in the year 1959. There is a police station in Elephant Gate.

There existed a bridge named Elephant Gate bridge, 89 years old, in between Basin Bridge railway station and Chennai Central railway station above the railway tracks. Near about 10,000 vehicles, during peak hours, crossed this bridge. Due to the weakness of the bridge and to decongest the traffic, the bridge was demolished; and a new bridge, with the length of about 156.12 m is being constructed. The construction works are carried out by the Greater Chennai Corporation and Southern Railway, Chennai division. The cost of the project is about ₹30 crore and is equally shared by Greater Chennai Corporation and Southern Railway. Still the construction work in progress and likely to get over in August 2025.

Ranganathaswamy Devasthanam Temple and Vaikunta Perumal & Dharmarajar Devasthanam Temple are a few important temples in Elephant Gate area.
