= Seven Wells =

Neighbourhood in Chennai

- Neighbourhood
- Seven Wells (Chennai)
- Coordinates: 13°05′46.0″N 80°16′53.8″E
- Country: India
- State: Tamil Nadu
- District: Chennai district
- Elevation: 33 m (108 ft)

Languages
  - Official: Tamil, English
  - Speech: Tamil, English
- Time zone: UTC+5:30 (IST)
- PIN: 600001
- Telephone Code: +9144xxxxxxxx
- Neighbourhoods: George Town, Vannarapettai, Tondiarpet, Sowcarpet
- LS: Chennai Central Lok Sabha constituency
- VS: Harbour Assembly constituency
- MP: Dayanidhi Maran
- MLA: P. K. Sekar Babu
- Website: https://chennaicorporation.gov.in

Seven Wells is a neighbourhood in Chennai district of Tamil Nadu State in peninsular India. Its name was derived from the seven number of wells, dug out for clean drinking water and supplied to Fort, during the British period in Chennai. The seven wells were ordered to dig by Francis Whyte Ellis, an Englishman, who was an official of the East India Company, later became Collector of 'Madras' (renamed and called as Chennai nowadays). Seven Wells constitute Seven Wells North [Seven Wells North is located at an altitude of 33 m above the mean sea level with the geographical coordinates of 13°06'11.5"N 80.16'53.8"E (i.e. 13.103200°N 80.281600°E)] and Seven Wells South [Seven Wells South is located at an altitude of 33 m above the mean sea level with the geographical coordinates of 13°05'46.0"N 80°16'53.8"E (i.e. 13.096100°N 80.281600°E)]. Out of the seven wells dug, only two are in use nowadays. This place was earlier called as Peddanaikenpet. Seven Wells is a crowded place of residents and businesses.

== Location ==
Located at an altitude of 33 m above the mean sea level, the geographical coordinates of Seven Wells are 13°05'55.7"N 80°16'53.8"E (i.e. 13.098800°N 80.281600°E). Seven Wells area is bounded by Mint, Audiappa, and Varadha Muthiyappan streets and Vallalar (Mint) flyover. Apart from these streets, Seven Wells, Govindappa, Anna, Thatha Muthiyappan, Sambier, Shanmugarayan, Gregory, Portuguese Church streets are few other important streets in Seven Wells.

== Neighbourhoods ==
Sowcarpet, Mannadi, George Town, Vannarapettai, Tondiarpet, and Vallalar Nagar are some of the important neighbourhoods in Seven Wells.

== Transport ==
=== Road transport ===
Seven Wells is served by a lot of bus services operated by Metropolitan Transport Corporation, Chennai.

=== Rail transport ===
Basin Bridge railway station is the nearby railway station to Seven Wells.

== Vallalar house ==
Ramalinga Swamigal alias Vallalar, who is better known for his contribution to spirituality and Tamil literature, lived 150 years ago in Veerasamy Pillai street in Seven Wells.
