= Basin bridge =

- Neighbourhood
- Basin bridge (Chennai)
- Coordinates: 13°06′23.5″N 80°16′31.2″E
- Country: India
- State: Tamil Nadu
- District: Chennai district
- Elevation: 28 m (92 ft)

Languages
  - Official: Tamil, English
  - Speech: Tamil, English
- Time zone: UTC+5:30 (IST)
- PIN: 600021
- Telephone Code: +9144xxxxxxxx
- Neighbourhoods: George Town, Royapuram, Kondithope, Mannadi Vannarapettai, Tondiarpet, Sowcarpet, Vallalar Nagar and Kasimedu
- LS: Chennai Central Lok Sabha constituency
- VS: Harbour Assembly constituency
- MP: Dayanidhi Maran
- MLA: P. K. Sekar Babu
- Website: https://chennaicorporation.gov.in

Basin bridge is a neighbourhood in Chennai district of Tamil Nadu state in the peninsular India. It is located at an altitude of about 28 m above the mean sea level with the geographical coordinates of 13°06′23.5″N 80°16′31.2″E (i.e., 13.106535°N, 80.275340°E). George Town, Royapuram, Kondithope, Mannadi Vannarapettai, Tondiarpet, Sowcarpet, Vallalar Nagar and Kasimedu are some of the important neighbourhoods of Basin Bridge area.

== Transportation ==
Basin Bridge area is served by Vallalar Nagar (Mint) Bus stand. Metropolitan Transport Corporation of Chennai operates numerous bus services via. the adjoining roads of Basin Bridge namely Chennai - Thiruttani - Renigunta National Highway and Wall Tax road. Basin Bridge road is an important road that serves Basin Bridge area. Broadway bus terminus is situated at about 4 km from here. The 89 year old Elephant Gate bridge is demolished due to its weakness and heavy traffic and a new bridge is being constructed which is 156.12 m long, at an estimated project cost of ₹30.78 crore. Basin Bridge is served by Basin Bridge Junction railway station and Washermanpet metro station. One of the national hub of railway stations viz., Puratchi Thalaivar Dr. M. G. Ramachandran Central railway station is 3 km away from Basin Bridge. The fifth Indian Vande Bharat Express train and the first of its kind to South India that runs between Mysuru and Chennai that connects Bengaluru passes through Basin Bridge Junction railway station. This train covers a distance of 504 km in seven hours, with a stopping at Bengaluru in between. And a workshop for servicing Vande Bharat Express trains is being set up near Basin Bridge Junction railway station. Chennai International Airport is located at about 22 km from Basin Bridge.

== Politics ==
Basin Bridge area falls under the Harbour Assembly constituency. The winner of the election held in the year 2021 as the member of its assembly constituency is P. K. Sekar Babu. Also, this area belongs to Chennai Central Lok Sabha constituency. Dayanidhi Maran won the 2019 elections, as the member of its Lok Sabha constituency.
