= Howrah–Kanyakumari Express =

Overview
- Service type: Superfast Express
- Status: Operating
- Locale: West Bengal, Odisha, Andhra Pradesh & Tamil Nadu
- First service: 1 July 2000; 26 years ago
- Current operator: Southern Railway zone

Route
- Termini: Howrah (HWH); Kanyakumari (CAPE)
- Stops: 29
- Distance travelled: 2,431 km (1,511 mi)
- Average journey time: 42 hours, 35 minutes
- Service frequency: Weekly
- Train number: 12665/12666
- Lines used: Howrah-Chennai main line (HWH – KOK); Diamond Junction of Chennai (KOK – WST); Guntakal–Chennai Egmore section (WST – MS); Chennai Egmore–Thanjavur line (MS – VM); Chord line (VM – TPJ)

On-board services
- Classes: 2A, 3A, SL, SLR, HCPV and UR/GS
- Disabled access: Disabled access
- Seating arrangements: AC 2 Tier, AC 3 Tier, Sleeper Class, Unreserved.
- Catering facilities: Pantry Car

Technical
- Operating speed: 56 kilometres per hour (35 mph)
- Track owner: Southern Railway zone
- Timetable number: 29/21/29A/21A
- Rake maintenance: Nagercoil Junction
- Rake sharing: Mumbai CST - Nagercoil Balaji Express; Mumbai Nagercoil Express
Route map
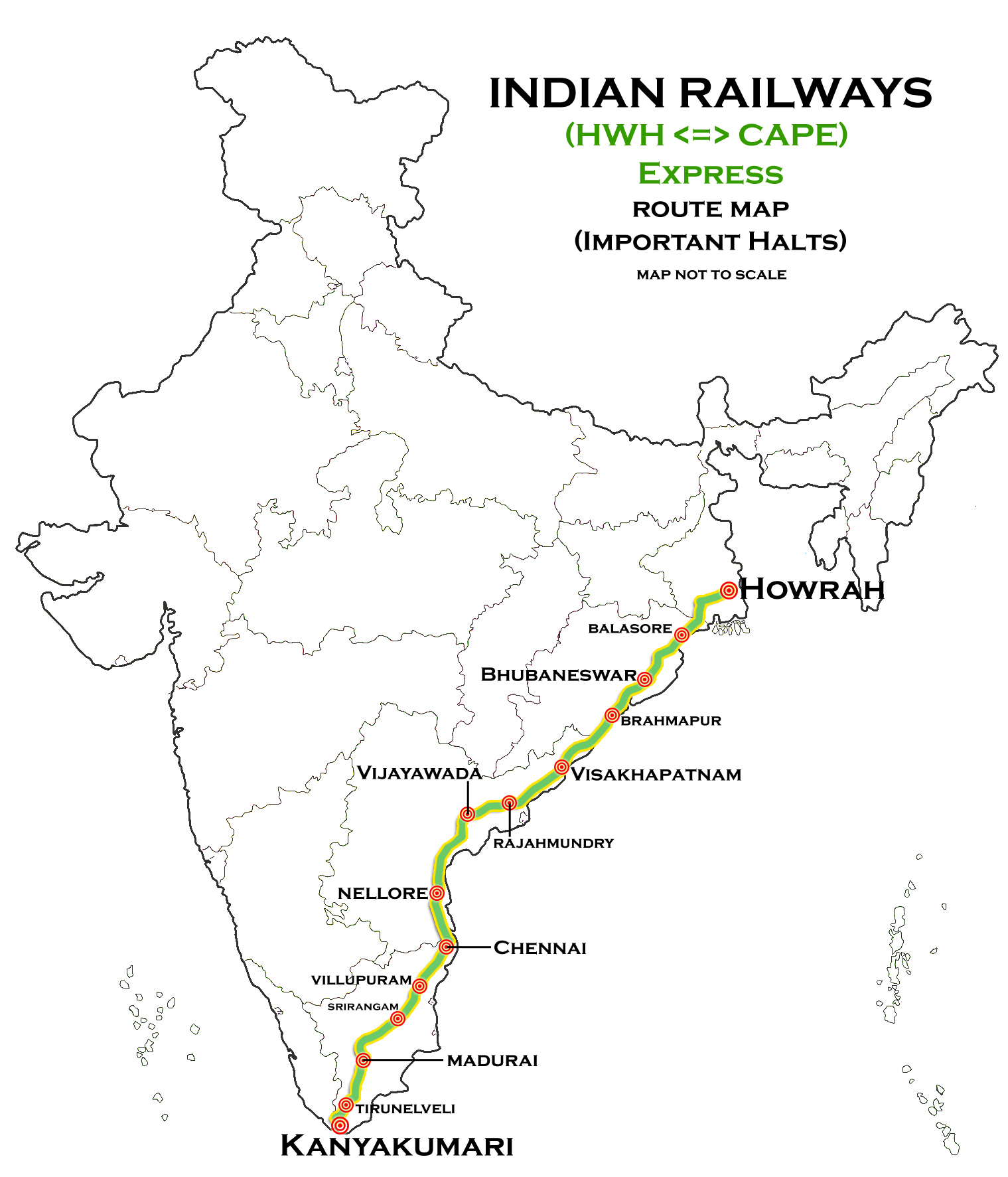

The Howrah–Kanyakumari Express is a Superfast inter-city express service connecting Howrah (Kolkata), West Bengal with Kanyakumari, Tamil Nadu in India. It runs with highly refurbished LHB coaches designed at ICF, Chennai.

== Overview ==
This express train was, numbered 6355/6356, introduced during the 1999–2000 Railway Budget as a new weekly train extending the Tiruchirappalli – Howrah Superfast Express, thereby truncating the service of the latter from tri–weekly to bi–weekly. The train connecting Howrah/Kolkata in West Bengal and Kanyakumari in Tamil Nadu made its inaugural run on 1 July 2000. This train was converted to Superfast category and re-numbered to 2665/2666 from 1 December 2006 onwards. Later, the train number was changed to 12665/12666 from December 2010 onwards as a part of train management system over the entire Indian Railways network.

== Rakes ==
The train has 22 coaches comprising One AC 2-Tier, Three AC 3-tier, Eleven Sleeper class, Three General compartments (Unreserved), Two Sleeper-cum-Luggage rake (SLR), One High-Capacity Parcel Van (HCPV) and one pantry car. (Note: The coach composition is subject to change.)

Loco	1	2	3	4	5	6	7	8	9	10	11	12	13	14	15	16	17	18	19	20	21	22
	HCPV	SLR	UR	S1	S2	S3	S4	S5	S6	PC	S7	S8	S9	S10	S11	A1	B1	B2	B3	UR	UR	SLR

== Schedule ==
The train numbered 12665 leaves Howrah at 16:15 hours every Mondays and arrives Kanyakumari at 10:50 hours on Wednesdays. On the return journey, the train leaves Kanyakumari at 05:30 hours every Saturdays and arrives Howrah at 23:55 hours on Sundays. (Note: The timings are in Indian Standard Time.) Some of the prominent stoppages includes Kharagpur, Bhubaneswar, Visakhapatnam,Rajahmundry, Eluru,Vijayawada, Ongole, Chennai Egmore, Viluppuram Junction, Tiruchirappalli Junction, Madurai Junction, Tirunelveli Junction and Nagercoil Junction. There is a heavy demand for this train for stoppage in Vallioor railway station.

== See also ==
- Tiruchirappalli – Howrah Superfast Express
- Cholan Express
- Pallavan Express
- Vaigai express
- Tiruchirappalli – Tirunelveli Intercity Express
- IRCTC
