= List of Tamil Nadu Government Arts and Science Colleges =

This is a list of arts and science college run and controlled by the State Government of Tamil Nadu in India. Thee colleges are under the control of Directorate of Collegiate Education Chennai.

College name	Place	District	Established year
Government Arts and Science College for Women,	Alangulam	Tenkasi	
Government Arts College	Ariyalur	Ariyalur	1965
Government College of Arts and Sciences	Arakkonam	Ranipettai	
Government Arts and Science College	Aranthangi	Pudukkottai	
Government College of Arts and Sciences	Harur	Dharmapuri	
Government College of Arts and Sciences	Aruppukottai	Virudhunagar	
Arignar Anna Government. Arts College	Attur	Salem	1972
Government Arts and Science College	Aundipatti	Theni	
Government Arts and Science College,	Avinashi		
Government Arts and Science College	Burgur		2017
Government Arts and Science College For Women	Bargur		1993
Rajeswari Vedachalam Government Arts College	Chengalpattu	Chengalpattu	1970
Bharathi Women’s College	Chennai	Chennai	1964
Institute of Advanced Studies in Education	Saidapet	Chennai	1887
Quaid-E-Millath Government College For Women	Anna Salai	Chennai	1974
Government. Arts College (Men)	Nandanam	Chennai	1969
Dr. Ambedkar Government. Arts College	Vysarpadi,	Chennai	1973
Queen Mary’s College	Mylapore	Chennai	1914
Presidency College	Chennai	Chennai	1840
Lady Wellington Institute of Advanced Study In Education	Saidapet	Chennai	1922
Government College of Arts and Sciences	Chennamangalam	Namakkal	
Arignar Anna Government. Arts College	Cheyyar		1967
Government Arts College	Chidambaram	Cudalore	1982
Government Arts College	Coimbatore	Coimbatore	1919
Government College of Education for Women	Coimbatore	Coimbatore	1956
Periyar Arts College	Cuddalore	Cuddalore	1964
M. V. Muthiah Government Arts College for Women	Dindigul	Dindigul	1966
Government College of Arts and Sciences	Edappadi	Salem	
Government Thirumagal Mills College	Gudiyatham		1964
Government Arts and Science College	Gudalur		
Government Arts and Science College (Co-Ed)	Hosur		2013
Government College of Arts and Sciences	Jambukulam	Ranipettai	
Government College of Arts and Sciences	Jayangondam	Ariyalur	
Government Arts and Science College, (Co-Ed)	Kadaladi		2013
Government College of Arts and Sciences	Kadayanallur	Tenkasi	
Government College of Arts and Sciences	Kallakurichi	Kallakurichi	
Government Arts and Science College (Co-Ed)	Kangeyam	Tiruppur	2013
Alagappa Government Arts College	Karaikudi	Sivagangai	1985
Government Arts and Science College	Karambakudi	Pudukkottai	2013
Government Arts and Science College	Karimangalam	Dharmapuri	2013
Manbumigu Dr. Puratchi Thalaivar M.G.R Government Arts and Science College	Kattumannar Koil		
Government Arts and Science College for Women	Kodaikanal	Dindigul	
Government Arts and Science College	Kottur		
Government College of Education	Komarapalayam	Namakkal	1955
Government Arts and Science College (Co-Ed)	Komarapalayam	Namakkal	2013
Government Arts College (Co-Ed)	Kovilpatti	Tuticorin	2013
Government Arts College For Men	Krishnagiri	Krishnagiri	1964
Government Arts College For Women	Krishnagiri	Krishnagiri	1993
Dr.Puratchi Thalaivar M.G.R Government Arts and Science College	Kudavasal	Thiruvarur	
Government. Arts College	Kulithalai	Karur	2007
Government Arts College (Autonomous)	Kumbakonam	Thanjavur	1854
Government Arts College for Women	Kumbakonam	Thanjavur	1963
Government Arts and Science College	Kumulur, Lalgudi	Thiruchirapalli	
Government Arts and Science College	Kuthalam	Mayiladuthurai	recent
Puratchi Thalaivar Dr. M.G.R Government Arts and Science College	Madhanur		2017
Sri Meenakshi Government Arts College For Women	Madurai	Madurai	1965
Government Arts and Science College (Co-Ed)	Manalmedu		2014
Manani Raja Gopala Swamy Government Arts College	Mannargudi	Thiruvaru	1971
Dharmapuram Gnanambigai Government. Arts College for Women	Mayiladuthurai	Mayiladuthurai	1967
Government Arts College	Melur	Madurai	1969
Government Arts and Science College	Mettupalayam	Coimbatore	2016
Government Arts and Science College	Modakkurchi	Erode	
Govt. Arts and Science College, (Co-Ed)	Mudukulathur	Ramanathapuram	2013
Arignar Annal Government. Arts College	Musiri	Thiruchirapallai	1969
Government Arts and Science College	Nagarkoil	Kanyakumari	2016
Government College of Arts and Sciences	Nagalapuram	Thoothukudi	
Government Arts and Science College	Nagappattinam	Nagappattinam	
Arignar Anna Government. Arts College For Men	Namakkal	Namakkal	1968
Namakkal Kavignar Ramalingam Government Arts College for Women	Namakkal	Namakkal	1969
Government College of Arts and Sciences	Nannilam	Thiruvarur	
Government College of Arts and Sciences	Nemmeli	Chengalpattu	
Government Arts College For Women	Nilakkottai	Dindigul	1998
Government Arts and Science College for Women	Orathanadu	Thanjavur	
Government. College Of Education	Orathanadu	Thanjavu	1957
Bharat Ratna Puratchi Thalaivar Dr. M.G.R Government Arts and Science College	Palacode	Dharmapuri	2017
Government Arts and Science College	Palladam		2017
Government College of Arts and Sciences	Papirettipatti	Dharmapuri	
Government. Arts College	Paramakudi	Ramanathapuram	1995
Government Arts and Science College	Pennagaram	Dharmapuri	
Government Arts and Science College	Perambalur	Perambalur	
Govt. Arts and Science College (Co-Ed)	Peravurani	Thanjavur	2013
Government Arts and Science College	Perumbakkam		2016
Government Arts and Science College, Pollachi	Pollachi	Coimbatore	
Loganatha Narayanaswamy Government Arts College	Ponneri		1965
H.H. The Rajah’s College	Pudukkottai	Pudukkottai	1880
Government College Of Education	Pudukkottai	Pudukkottai	1955
Government Arts College For Women	Pudukkottai	Pudukkottai	1969
VS Sivalingam Government Arts College	Pulankurichi	Sivagangai	1972
Government Arts and Science College	Puliankulam	Coimbatore	
Government Arts and Science College	R.K.Nagar	Chennai	2015
Sethupathy Government Arts College	Ramanathapuram	Ramanathapuram	1965
Government Art College For Women	Ramanathapuram	Ramanathapuram	1994
Bharat Ratna Dr. A.P.J. Abdul Kalam Government Arts and Science College	Rameshwaram	Ramanathapuram	2019
Thiruvalluvar Government Arts College	Rasipuram	Namakkal	1968
Government Arts and Science College	Rishivandiyam		
Government Arts College	Salem	Salem	1879
Government Arts College For Women	Salem	Salem	1979
Government Arts and Science College	Sankarankovil		
Government Arts and Science College (Women)	Sathankulam	Tuticorin	
Government Arts and Science College	Sathyamangalam	Erode	2016
Ponmana Semmal Puratchi Thalaivar M.G.R Government Arts and Science College	Seerkazhi		2017
Government College of Arts and Sciences	Srivilliputhur	Virudhunagar	
Raja Doraisingam Government Arts College	Sivagangai	Sivagangai	1947
Government Arts College for Women	Sivagangai	Sivagangai	1998
Government Arts and Science College (Co-Ed)	Sivakasi	Virudhunagar	2013
Government Arts and Science College	Srirangam	Thiruchirappalli	
Kamarajar Govt Arts College	Surandai		
Rajah Serfoji Government College	Thanjavur	Thanjavur	1965
Kunthavai Nachiar Government Arts College for Women	Thanjavur	Thanjavur	1966
Government Arts College	Thanthonimalai	Karur	1966
Government Arts and Science College	Tharangampatti	Karur	2020
Government Arts and Science College	Thennangur - Vandavasi		
Government College of Arts and Sciences	Thondamuthur	Coimbatore	
Government College of Arts and Sciences	Thiruthuraipoondi	Thiruvarur	
Govt. Arts and Science College, (Co-Ed)	Thiruvadanai	Ramanathapuram	2013
Government College of Arts and Sciences	Thirupathur	Thirupathur	
Government. Arts College	Thiruvannamalai	Thiruvannamalai	1966
Thiru. Vi-Ka Government. Arts College	Thiruvarur	Thiruvaru	1970
Government College of Arts and Sciences	Tiruvottiyur	Tiruvallur	
Government. Arts and Science College	Thittamalai	Karur	2017
Government College of Arts and Sciences	Tittakkudi	Cuddalore	
Thiru A.Govindaswami Government Arts College	Tindivanam		1969
Rani Anna Government College for Women	Tirunelveli	Tirunelveli	1970
Chikkana Government Arts College	Tiruppur	Tiruppur	1966
LRG Government Arts College For Women	Tiruppur	Tiruppur	1971
Sri Subramaniaswami Government Arts College	Tiruttani		1970
Government Arts and Science College	Thiruvennainallur		
Government. Arts College	Thiruverumbur	Tiruchirapalli	1973
Periyar EVR College	Tiruchirapalli	Tiruchirapalli	1965
Government Arts College	Udhagamandalam	Udhagamandalam	1955
Government Arts College	Udumalpet	Tiruppur	1971
Puratchi Thalaivar Dr. M.G.R Government Arts and Science College	Uthiramerur		2013
Government Arts and Science College	Valparai		
Government College of Arts and Sciences	Vanur	Villupuram	
Government College of Arts and Sciences	Vedaranyam	Nagapattinam	
Government Arts and Science College	Veerapandi	Theni	2016
Government College of Education	Vellore	Vellore	1955
Muthurangam Government. Arts College	Vellore	Vellore	1965
Govt. Arts and Science College (Co-Ed)	Veppanthattai	Perambalur	2014
Government College of Arts and Sciences	Veppur	Perambalur	
Arignar Anna Government Arts College	Villupuram	Villupuram	1968
Dr.M.G.R. Government Arts and Science College for Women	Villupuram	Villupuram	
Government College of Arts and Sciences	Sattur	Virudhunagar	
Government College of Arts and Sciences	Vedasandur	Dindigul	
Thiru. Kolanjiappar Government Arts College	Virudhachalam		1966
Arignar Anna Government. Arts College For Women	Walajapet		1968
Government Arts and Science College	Manapparai	Thiruchirapalli	2022
Government Arts and Science College	Vadalur	Cuddalore	2023
