= Basin Bridge Gas Turbine Power Station =

Building in India

- Country: India
- Location: Basin bridge, Chennai 600 012, Tamil Nadu
- Coordinates: 13°05′55″N 80°16′10″E
- Status: Operational
- Commission date: February–March 1996
- Construction cost: ₹ 490.23 crores
- Owner: TNEB
- Operator: TNEB

Thermal power station
- Primary fuel: Naphtha
- Secondary fuel: Natural gas

Power generation
- Units operational: 4 × 30 MW
- Nameplate capacity: 120 MW

Basin Bridge Gas Turbine Power Station is a state-owned gas fuel-based power plant located in Basin bridge, Chennai. It has a capacity of 120 MW and is operated by the Tamil Nadu State Electricity Board.

== History ==
The plant was constructed as a 120-MW gas turbine power plant with four units, each with a capacity of 30 MW, the plant with all the four units was commissioned in February–March 1996. The power station was built at a cost of about ₹ 400 crores. The first two units were supplied by Overseas Economic Co-operative Fund, Japan, while the third and fourth units were from BHEL.

The plant is run and maintained by the Tamil Nadu Electricity Board (TNEB) and is normally used during peak hours (06:00 to 09:00 hours and 18:00 to 21:00 hours).

== Operations ==
The units can be operated by various fuels, such as naphtha and natural gas (dual-fuel system), and the starting fuel used is high-speed diesel (HSD). However, due to non-availability of natural gas/LNG in Chennai, the units are operated on naphtha fuel. From 20 January 2010, the units are run also as synchronous condenser to supply reactive power to the grid for better voltage profile and system stability. The plant is operated in open cycle mode. The cost of generation of power at the plant was ₹ 9.72 per unit.

=== Capacity ===
Unit Number	Installed Capacity (MW)	Make	Date of Commissioning	Fuel	Combined/Open cycle	Status
1	30	Sumitomo & ABB	12 February 1996	Naphtha	Open cycle	Running
2	30	Sumitomo & ABB	25 February 1996	Naphtha	Open cycle	Running
3	30	BHEL	26 March 1996	Naphtha	Open cycle	Running
4	30	BHEL	31 March 1996	Naphtha	Open cycle	Running

== Incidents ==
On 6 March 2000, a fire broke out at around 21:00 hours at Unit IV of the power station, which was put out by more than 20 fire tenders and Metrowater tankers. Initially, smoke emanated from the reduction gear compartment used to reduce the speed of the machine. At the time of the event, three of the four units were functioning, generating 90 MW of power. All the units were switched off as a precautionary measure until the fire was put out. There was neither any causality nor any loss of power generation.

== See also ==
- List of power stations in India
