= Mannadi, Chennai =

Neighbourhood in Chennai district, Tamil Nadu, India

Mannadi, Chennai Mannadi
- Neighbourhood
- Mannadi (Chennai)
- Coordinates: 13°05′37.7″N 80°17′20.8″E
- Country: India
- State: Tamil Nadu
- District: Chennai district
- Elevation: 33 m (108 ft)

Languages
  - Official: Tamil, English
  - Speech: Tamil, English
- Time zone: UTC+5:30 (IST)
- PIN: 600001
- Telephone Code: +9144xxxxxxxx
- Neighbourhoods: George Town, Royapuram, Kasimedu, Vannarapettai, Tondiarpet, Sowcarpet
- LS: Chennai Central Lok Sabha constituency
- VS: Harbour Assembly constituency
- MP: Dayanidhi Maran
- MLA: P. K. Sekar Babu
- Website: https://chennaicorporation.gov.in

Mannadi is a Neighbourhood in Chennai district in the state of Tamil Nadu in the peninsular India. It is flooded with almost all kind of businesses. Industrial, factory needed, domestic utility products are widely available. Tradings of various components / rods / sheets / tubes / pipes / screws / bolts / nuts, etc., made of Stainless Steel, Brass, Copper, Aluminium, Bronze, Mild steel, Iron, Cast Iron, Nylon, Plastic, etc. in wholesale and retail are carried out here.

In connection with the Coimbatore car blast which was performed by unknown persons on 23 October 2022, the residents of the suspects and supporters of ISIS at various places in Chennai including Mannadi area, are raided by the police and NIA (National Investigation Agency). Mannadi is a crowded place and is encroached by various shops. Mannadi street, Jaffar Sarang street, Naranappa street are some of the important roads in Mannadi. Mannadi is bounded by Rajaji Salai, Errabalu street, Jones street and Mannadi street. Apart from these, some of the important streets in Mannadi are Jaffar Sarang street, Post office street, Naranappa street, Moore street, Linghi Cherry street, Angappa Naicken street, Thambu Chetty street, Sembudoss street and Armenian street.

== Location ==
Located at an altitude of 33 m above the mean sea level, the geographical coordinates of Mannadi are 13°05'37.7"N 80°17'20.8"E (i.e., 13.093800°N 80.289100°E).

== Neighbourhoods ==
George Town, Royapuram, Kasimedu, Vallalar Nagar, Vannarapettai, Tondiarpet, Sowcarpet are few important neighbourhoods of Mannadi.

== Transport ==
=== Road transport ===
Metropolitan Transport Corporation in Chennai operates numerous bus services via., Rajaji Salai, Prakasam Salai (Broadway) and N. S. C. (Nethaji Subash Chandra) Bose road that helps the public visit Mannadi.

=== Rail transport ===
Mannadi is served by Chennai Beach railway station through which hundreds of suburban trains and express trains halt and pass by.

==== Metro train services ====
Chennai Metro's underground stretch of the Blue line passes through Mannadi. There is also a metro station viz., Mannadi metro station on Prakasam Salai that goes through Mannadi.

== Education ==
=== School ===
Mannadi has a school namely, St. Mary's Anglo-Indian Higher Secondary School, on Armenian street.

== Medical facility ==
There is a medical facility viz., Chennai National Hospital on Jaffar Sarang street, Mannadi.

== Worshipping ==
=== Temples ===
Kalikambal temple where the Maratta King Chatrapati Shivaji once offered worship, and Kachchaleswarar temple which is listed (S.No. 40) in Heritage Buildings announced by CMDA, are situated in Mannadi.

=== Church ===
St. Mary's Co-cathedral church is located on Armenian street.

=== Mosque ===
Masjid-e-Mamoor (Mamoor mosque), which was first built in the eighteenth century, is situated on Angappa street in Mannadi.
