= Puduvoyal =

- Suburb
- Location within Tamil Nadu Location within India
- Coordinates: 13.328744°N 80.144399°E
- Country: India
- State: Tamil Nadu
- District: Tiruvallur
- Metro: Chennai
- Talukas: Gummidipundi Taluk

Government
  - Type: Village Panchayat
- Elevation: 16 m (52 ft)

Languages
  - Official: Tamil
- Time zone: UTC+5:30 (IST)
- PIN: 601206
- Planning agency: DTCP
- Nearest City: Ponneri

Puduvoyal is a village panchayat located in the Thiruvallur district of Indian state of Tamil Nadu.

== Demographics ==
According to the latest 2011 census the village has a population of 3698 of which 1856 are males while 1842 are females as per Population Census 2011.

In Puduvoyal village population of children with age 0-6 is 402 which makes up 10.87 percent of total population of village. Average Sex Ratio of Puduvoyal village is 992 which is lower than Tamil Nadu state average of 996. Child Sex Ratio for the Puduvoyal as per census is 1062, higher than Tamil Nadu average of 943.

Puduvoyal village has lower literacy rate compared to Tamil Nadu. In 2011, literacy rate of Puduvoyal village was 71.36 percent compared to 80.09 percent of Tamil Nadu. In Puduvoyal Male literacy stands at 80.31 percent while female literacy rate was 62.26 percent.

== Work Profile ==
In Puduvoyal village out of total population, 1724 were engaged in work activities. 44.61% of workers describe their work as Main Work (Employment or Earning more than 6 Months) while 55.39% were involved in Marginal activity providing livelihood for less than 6 months. Of 1724 workers engaged in Main Work, 108 were cultivators (owner or co-owner) while 245 were Agricultural labourer.

Caste composition
Caste	Percent
SC	48.46%
ST	2.19%
Others†	49.35%
Caste composition † Other Backward Class and Forward caste.

== Transport ==
Normal buses	Express + Normal buses	Deluxe + Express + Normal buses	AC volvo + Deluxe + Express + Normal buses

Legend: HF- High Frequency Route, NS - Night Service Route, LF - Low Frequency Route

MTC Routes
Route	Start	End	Via	HF	NS	LF
512	Madarapakkam	Red Hills	Padianallur, Sholavaram, Karanoda, Thachur Koot Road, Puduvoyal, Kavarapettai, Dideer Nagar, Poovalambedu	x		
532	Periyapalayam	Vallalar Nagar	Vyasarpadi, Moolakadai, Kavangarai, Red Hills, Karanodai, Thatchur Koot Road, Puduvoyal, Arani			x
557	Broadway	Gummidipoondi	Beach R.S, Mint, Vyasarpadi, Moolakadai, Red Hills, Thachur Koot Road, Puduvoyal, Kavarapettai	x		
557A	V Nagar	Rettambedu	Basin Bridge, Vyasarpadi, Moolakadai, Puzhal, Red Hills, Karanodai, Thachur Koot Road, Puduvoyal, Kavarapettai			x
557C	Red Hills	Kallur	Karanodai, Thachur Koot Road, Puduvoyal, Kavarapettai, Gummidipoondi R.S., Elavur, Kuppam, Chinna Mangodu			x
557M	Red Hills	Madarpakkam	Karanodai, Thachur Koot Road, Puduvoyal, Kavarapettai, Gummidipoondi, Equavarpalayam, Pathirivedu			x
