= S. Dharmambal =

Indian social and women's rights activist (1890-1959)

Saminathan Dharmambal
- Born: 1890; Karuntattankudi, Madras presidency, British India
- Died: 20 May 1959 (aged 68–69)
- Monuments: Memorial in Moolakothalam, Chennai
- Occupations: Social activist, women's rights activist
- Known for: Founder of Manavar Mandram ("Student Forum")
- Spouse: Munisamy Naidu
- Awards: vira Tamil annai ("Heroic Tamil Mother")

Saminathan Dharmambal (1890–1959) was an Indian social activist and women's rights activist. She is remembered for her contributions to the Tamil language and involvement in the Anti-Hindi agitation of 1937–40. In 1951, she was given the title of vira Tamil annai ("Heroic Tamil Mother").

== Early life ==
Dharmambal was born in 1890 to Saminathan Chettiyar and Pappammal in Karuntattankudi (also known as Karanthai) near Thanjavur, Madras Presidency. She married drama actor Munisamy Naidu and moved to Chennai.

== Activities ==
Dharmambal was the secretary of the Tamil Women's Association, which was instrumental in safeguarding women's rights and education for girls. She supported Muthulakshmi Reddi's attempt to abolish the Devadasi system through legislation. She also actively participated in the Self-Respect Movement. She was one of the organisers of the 1938 conference of the Progressive Women's Association, which bestowed the title of Periyar ("Respected One" or "Elder") on E. V. Ramasamy. A day after the conference, on 14 November 1938, Dharmambal and other women activists picketed a school and were arrested.

Dharmambal founded the Manavar Mandram ("Student Forum") to bring education in Tamil to the youth of Chennai. She conducted Elavu varam (a week of mourning) to get equal pay for the Tamil teachers. She supported the remarriage of widows and inter-caste marriages.

She was a practitioner of Siddha medicine. She donated her home in Karuntattankudi to the Karanthai Tamil Sangam, a language society. She helped actor N. S. Krishnan present his appeal in the Privy Council of the United Kingdom in the Lakshmikanthan murder case. In a meeting in 1951, she was given the title of vira Tamil annai ("Heroic Tamil Mother") for her contributions to the Tamil language, especially for promoting Tamil education to youth through the Student Forum.

== Legacy ==
Dharmambal died on 20 May 1959. A memorial to her was erected in Moolakothalam, Chennai. The Government of Tamil Nadu introduced a scheme in 1975 to provide financial assistance to widows for remarriage in her honour.
