= Tiruchirappalli–Howrah Superfast Express =

Train in India

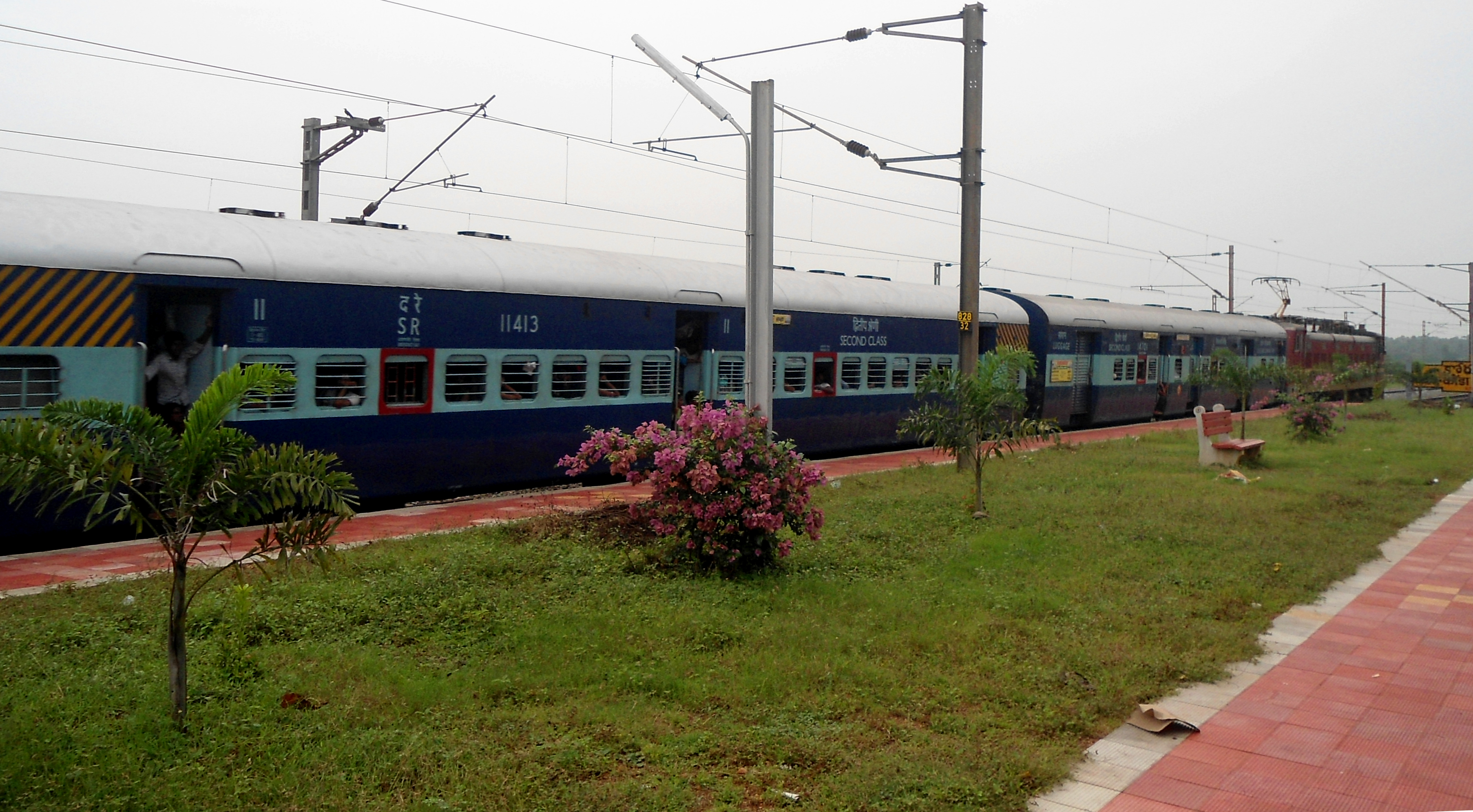
- Tirucchirapalli-Howrah Express exits Korukonda train station, Vizianagaram district

Overview
- Service type: Express
- Locale: Tamil Nadu, Andhra Pradesh, Odisha and West Bengal
- First service: 1998; 28 years ago
- Current operator: Southern Railway

Route
- Termini: Tiruchirappalli Junction (TPJ); Howrah (HWH)
- Stops: 21
- Distance travelled: 2,026 km (1,259 mi)
- Average journey time: 35 hours, 20 minutes
- Service frequency: Bi-weekly
- Train number: 12663 / 12664

On-board services
- Classes: AC First Class, AC 2 Tier, AC 3 Tier, Sleeper Class, General Unreserved
- Seating arrangements: Yes
- Sleeping arrangements: Yes
- Catering facilities: Available
- Observation facilities: Large windows

Technical
- Rolling stock: LHB coach
- Track gauge: 1,676 mm (5 ft 6 in)
- Operating speed: 57 km/h (35 mph) average including halts
Route map
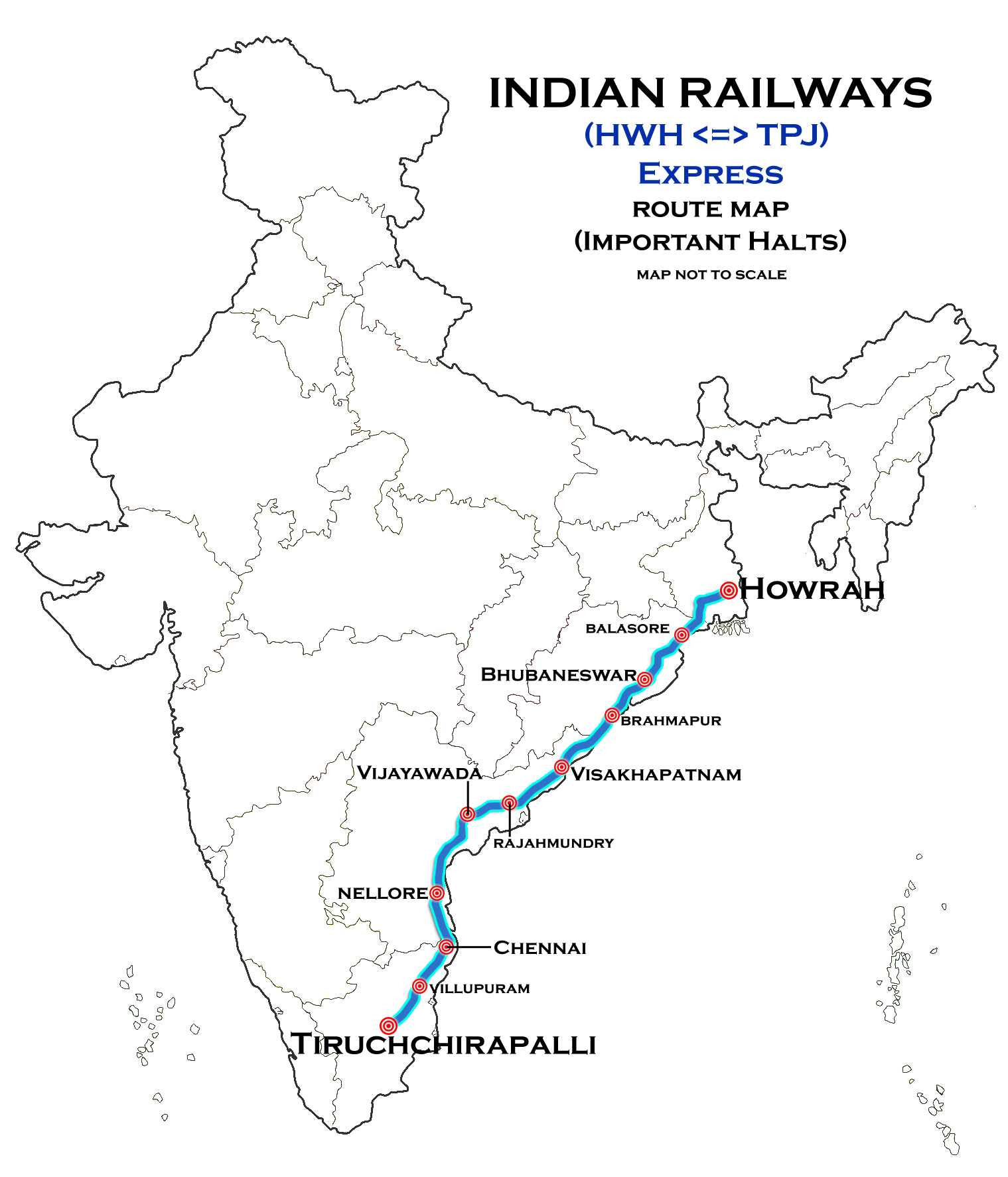

The 12663 / 12664 Tiruchirappalli – Howrah Superfast Express is an inter-city Express service connecting Tiruchirappalli, Tamil Nadu with Howrah (Kolkata), West Bengal in India. The train is the first long-distance train operated by Tiruchirappalli railway division from Tiruchirappalli Junction, running beyond Tamil Nadu border.

== Overview ==
This express train was introduced during the 1998–1999 Railway Budget to run between Tiruchirappalli in Tamil Nadu and Howrah/Kolkata in West Bengal tri-weekly, leaving Tiruchi on Tuesdays, Fridays and Saturdays. Numbered as 6803/6804, the service was reduced to bi-weekly, leaving Tiruchi on Tuesdays and Fridays only, in July 2000. On Saturdays the service was extended till Kanyakumari as a new service numbered 6355/6356.

This train was converted to Superfast type and re-numbered to 2663/2664 from 24 January 2006 (Tiruchi) and 26 January 2006 (Howrah). The train number was changed to 12663/12664 from December 2010 as a part of train management system over the entire Indian Railways network. The train runs with LHB rakes from August 2022.

== Rakes ==
The train has 24 coaches comprising 1 AC First Class Cum AC Two Tier, 1 AC Two Tier, 5 AC Three Tier, 12 Sleeper class, 2 General Unreserved,2 Luggage Cum Disabled Coaches and 1 Pantry Car. (Note: The coach composition is subject to change.)

| Loco | 1 | 2 | 3 | 4 | 5 | 6 | 7 | 8 | 9 | 10 | 11 | 12 | 13 | 14 | 15 | 16 | 17 | 18 | 19 | 20 | 21 | 22 | 23 | |
|---|---|---|---|---|---|---|---|---|---|---|---|---|---|---|---|---|---|---|---|---|---|---|---|---|
| | SLR | UR | S12 | S11 | S10 | S9 | S8 | S7 | S6 | S5 | PC | S4 | S3 | S2 | S1 | B5 | B4 | B3 | B2 | B1 | A1 | HA1 | UR | SLR |

== Schedule ==
This bi-weekly service leaves Tiruchirappalli Junction as 12664, arrives Visakhapatnam, reverses the loco and finally reaches the destination at Howrah. On the return journey, the train leaves Howrah as 12663, arrives Visakhapatnam the next day, reverses the loco and finally reaches the destination at Tiruchirappalli Junction Some of the prominent stoppages includes Vriddhachalam Junction, Viluppuram Junction, Chengalpattu Junction, Vijayawada Junction, Visakhapatnam, Vizianagaram Junction, Khurda Road Junction, Cuttack Junction and Kharagpur Junction. (Note: The timings are in Indian Standard Time.)

== See also ==
- Cholan Express
- Pallavan Express
- Rockfort Express
- Tiruchirappalli–Mayiladuthurai Express
- Vaigai Superfast Express
- Tiruchirappalli–Thiruvananthapuram Intercity Express
