= Washermanpet railway station =

Railway station in Chennai, India

Washermanpet Vannarapettai
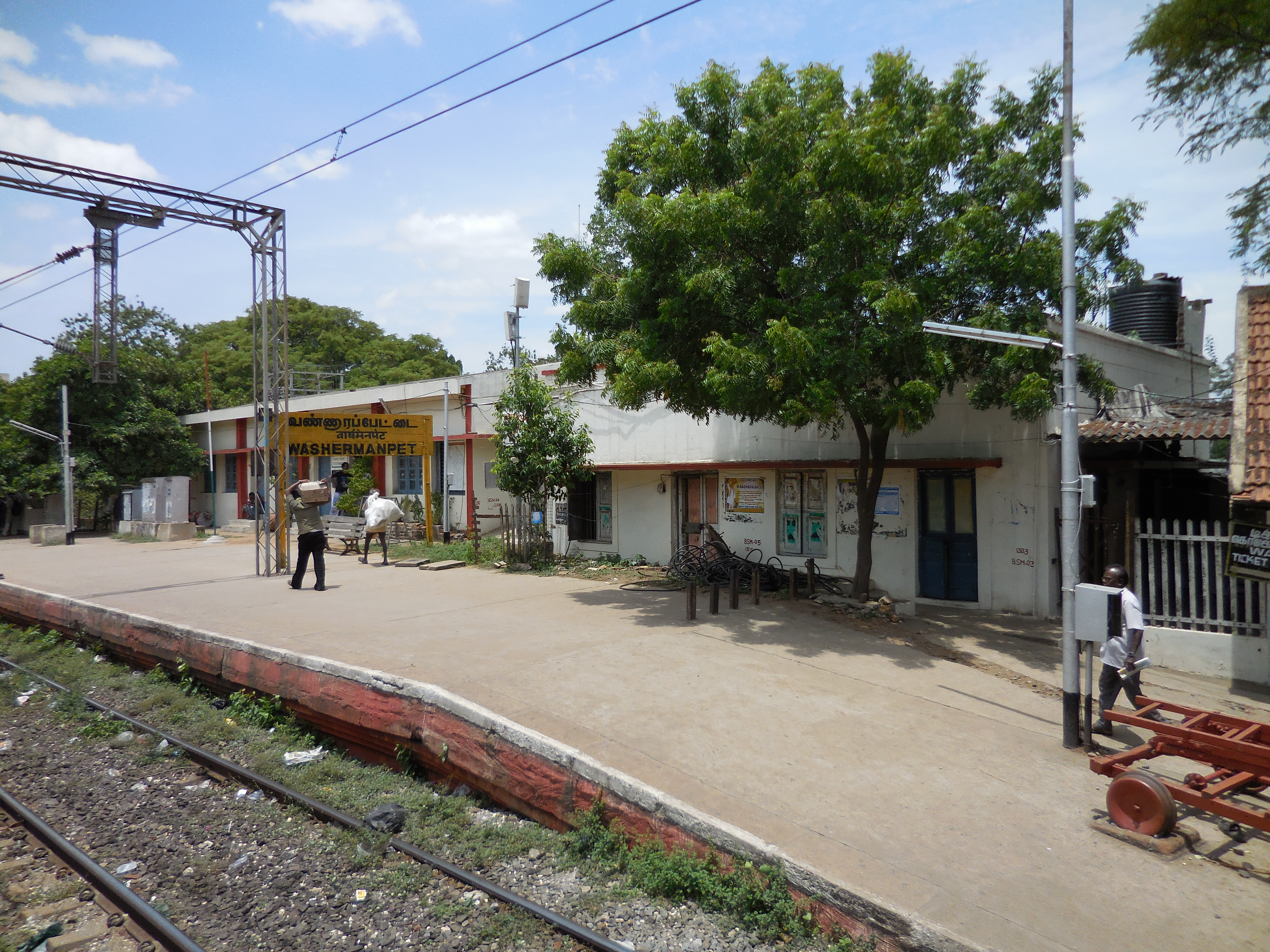
- Western end of Washermanpet railway station

General information
- Location: Washermanpet, Chennai, Tamil Nadu, India
- Coordinates: 13°6′31″N 80°16′55″E
- System: Indian Railways and Chennai Suburban Railway station
- Owner: Ministry of Railways, Indian Railways
- Lines: West, West North and West South lines of Chennai Suburban Railway
- Platforms: 2
- Tracks: 4
- Connections: Blue Line Washermanpet; MTC (Vallalar Nagar Mint bus terminus)

Construction
- Structure type: Standard on-ground station
- Parking: Available

Other information
- Status: Active
- Station code: WST
- Fare zone: Southern Railways

History
- Electrified: 9 August 1979
- Former names: South Indian Railway
Location
- Location within India Location within Tamil Nadu

Washermanpet railway station is one of the railway stations in Chennai, India. It is one of the stations of the Chennai Beach–Gummidipoondi and Chennai Beach-Arakkonam sections of the Chennai Suburban Railway Network. It serves the neighbourhood of Washermanpet, Korukkupet and Tondiarpet. It is situated at Washermanpet, with an elevation of 9 m above sea level. The station lies at the eastern end of the 'diamond' junction of Chennai's railway network, where all the lines of the Chennai Suburban Railway meet.

== History ==
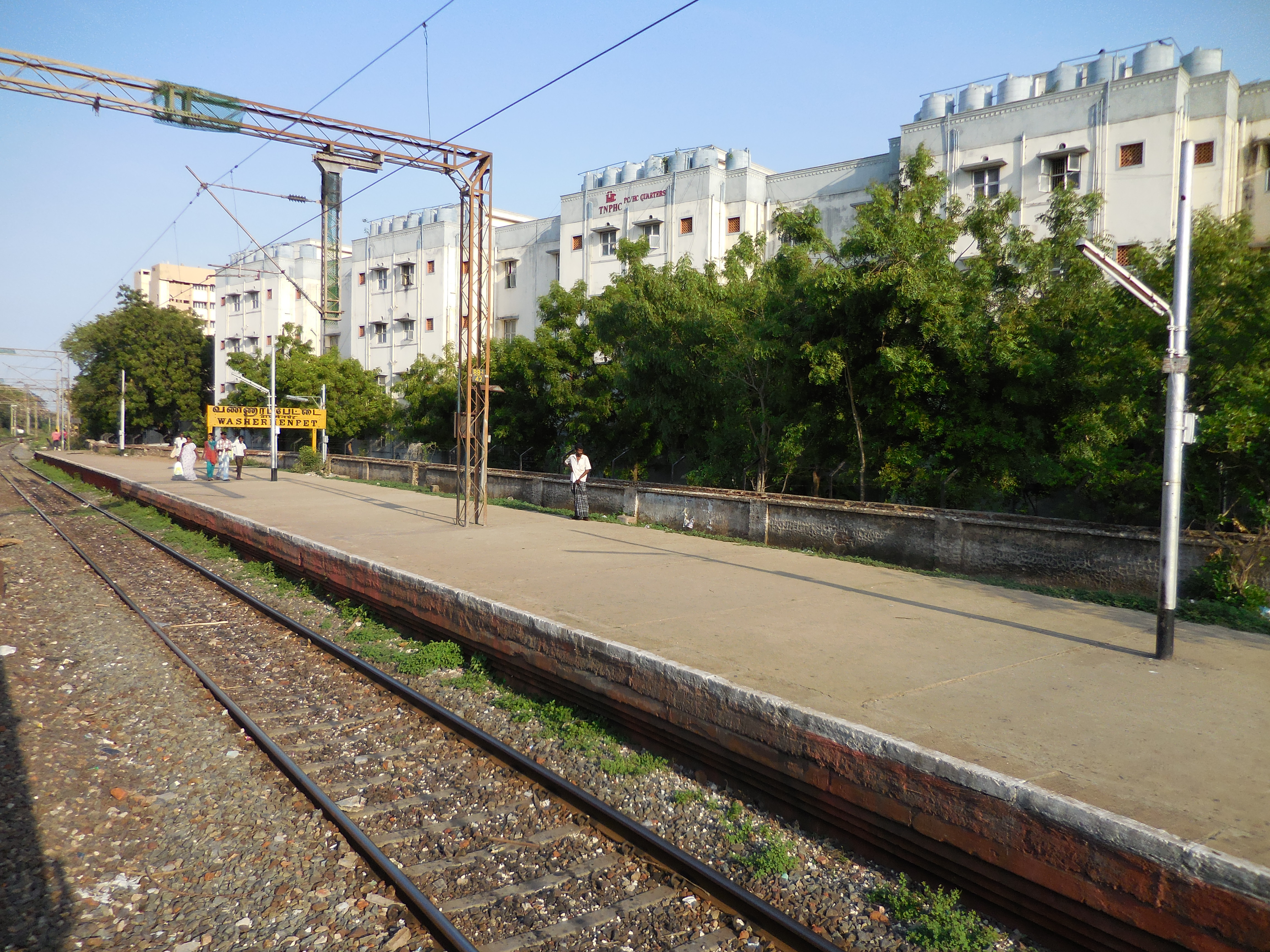
Platform 1 at the station (a view towards east)

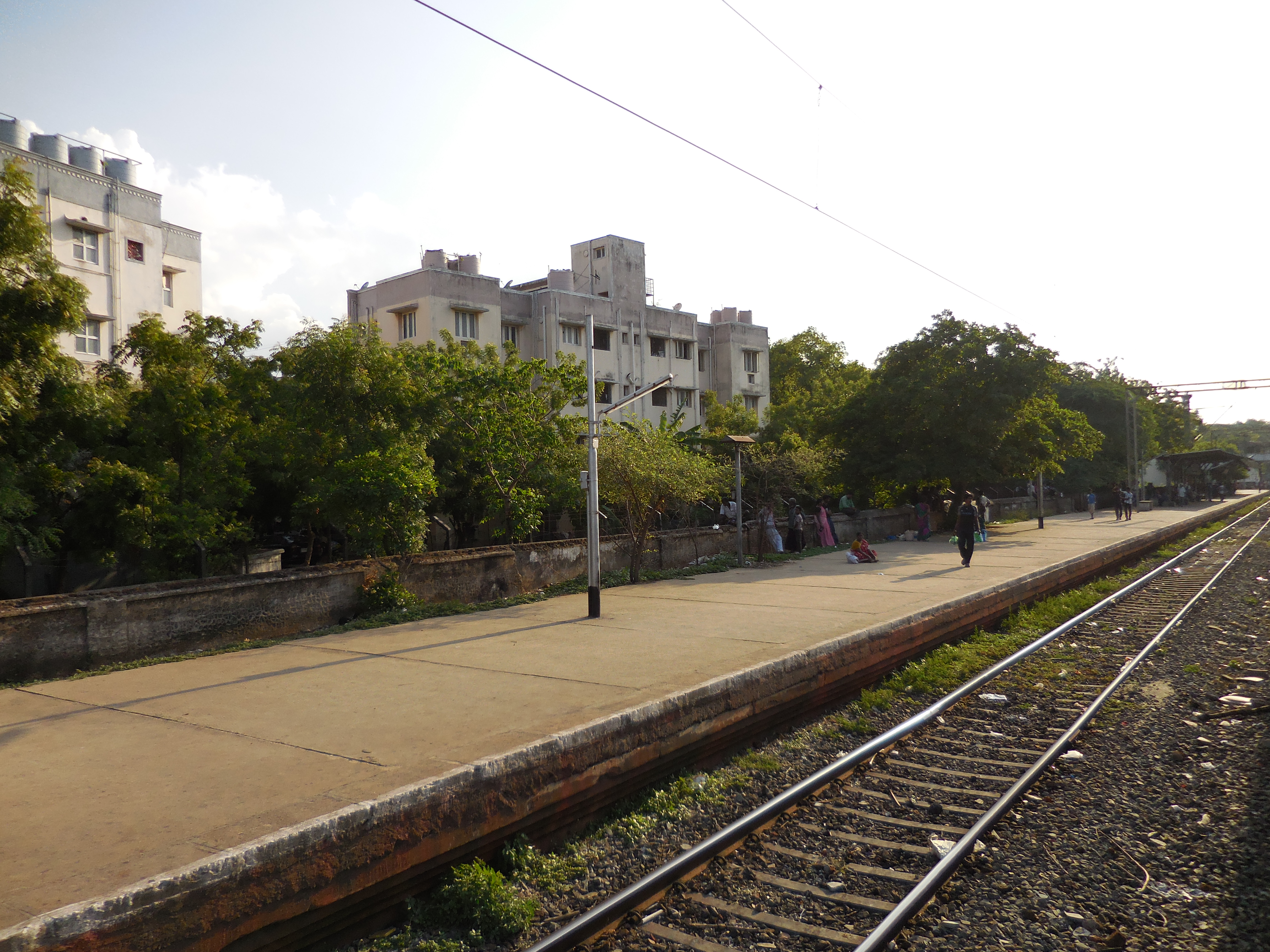
A view of the station towards the west

On 9 August 1979, the lines at the station were electrified with the electrification of the Chennai Beach–Basin Bridge section. The lines from Royapuram to Korukkupet were electrified on 26 September 1987.

== Facilities ==
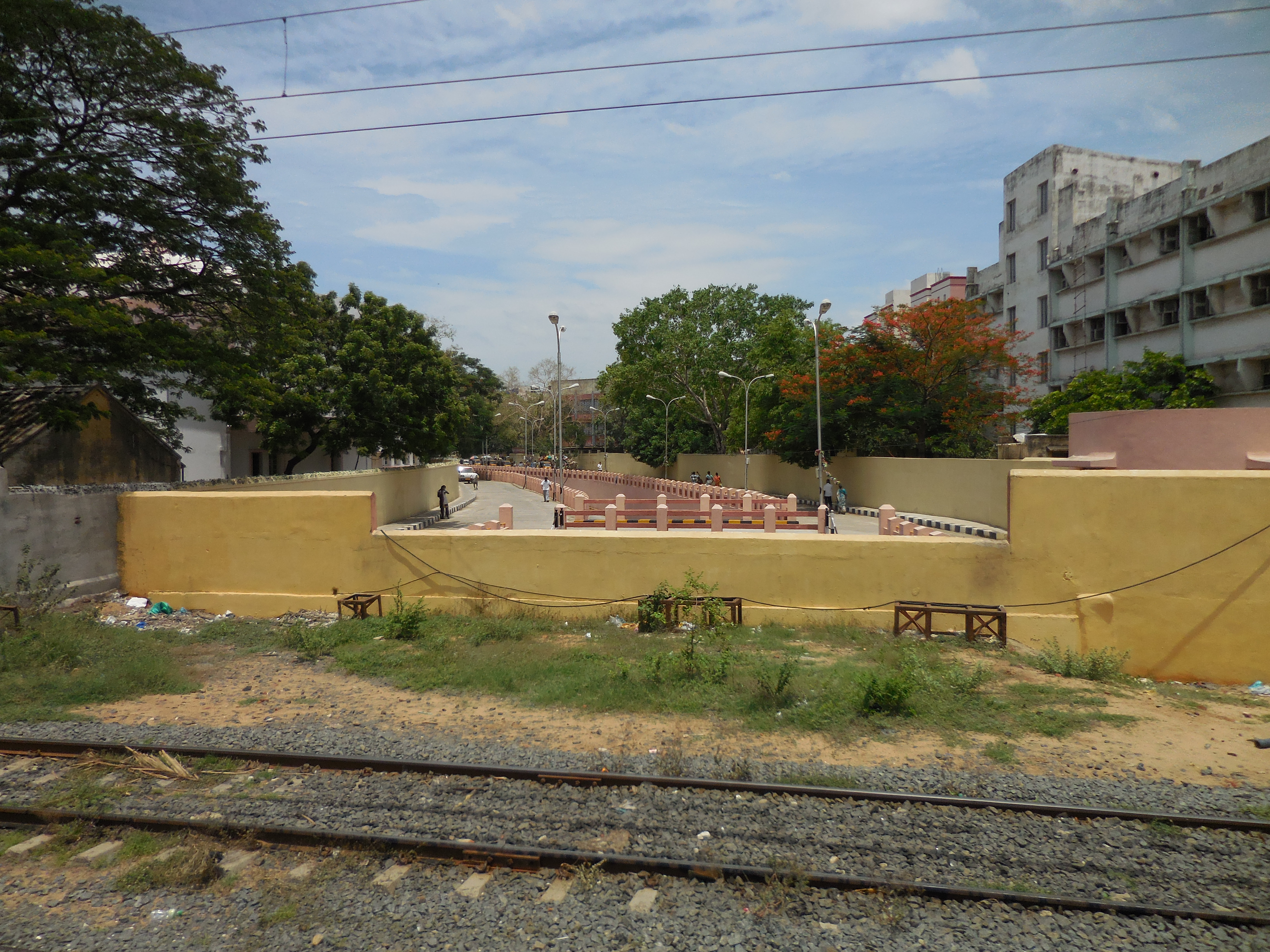
Vehicular subway near the eastern end of the station

Despite being in the vicinity of important institutions such as Stanley Hospital and RSRM Hospital, the station lacks several basic passenger amenities. There has been a demand for a computerised railway reservation counter at the station. It is also one the stations of the Chennai Metro Rail, which is under construction.

== See also ==
- Chennai Suburban Railway
- Railway stations in Chennai
