= Vannarapettai =

Vannarapettai Vannai, Pazhaya Vannarapettai, Washermenpet, Old Washermenpet
- Neighbourhood
- Washermanpet, (Chennai) Vannarapettai (Tamil Nadu) Vannarapettai (India)
- Coordinates: 13.1320°N 80.2784°E
- Country: India
- State: Tamil Nadu
- Metro: Chennai

Government
  - Body: CMDA
- Elevation: 30.96 m (101.6 ft)

Languages
  - Official: Tamil
- Time zone: UTC+5:30 (IST)
- PIN: 600021
- Vehicle registration: TN-04
- Planning agency: CMDA

Vannarapettai (transl. Washermenpet) is a northern neighbourhood of Chennai, India. It is also known as Pazhaya Vannarapettai (transl. Old Washermenpet), sometimes shortened as Vannai. It is located north of Parrys Corner and adjacent to Royapuram. Washermanpet is famous for its jewelry shops and matchbox industries, many of which are centered on two main arterial roads. Broadway, Parrys, Royapuram, Korukkupet, Tondiarpet, Kasimedu and Tiruvottiyur are located adjacent to this locality.

== History ==
The name comes from the fact that it used to be the washermen's enclave in Chennai, where many of the city's dhobi ghats used to be located. Prior to the development of T.Nagar and Purasawalkam, Washermenpet acted as the textile business hub of Chennai.

Washermenpet is one of the several Dhobikhanas in Chennai since colonial times with others being Adayar, Chetpet, Saidapet and Mylapore.

== Colleges and schools ==
There are many historical educational establishments present in this locality.

=== Schools ===
Old Washermanpet is surrounded by various private schools, government-run schools as well as government-aided schools to provide nursery to secondary education.

=== Colleges ===
Sir Theagaraya College is a government-aided college that is affiliated with the University of Madras, offering courses in the arts as well as sciences. It is one of the oldest colleges in Chennai.

== Hospitals ==
Stanley Hospital and RSRM Hospital are two major hospitals in Washermanpet while CSI Rainy is located in Gollavar Agraharam Road.

== Rail and road connectivity ==
Washermanpet has a bus terminus and a railway station. Washermanpet Metro Station serves as the northern terminus of the Blue Line of the Chennai Metro rail network and another metro station is expected to be located underground, near Sir Theagaraya College in Old Washermanpet.

== Parks and playgrounds ==
Anna Park is used by the residents for morning walks and recreational activities. Robinson Ground and Sir Theyagaraya Ground are frequented by children for sport activities. These public areas were often used by the Dravidan Federation during its nascent stages and witnessed several speeches given by orators such as C. N. Annadurai and M. Karunanidhi.

== Landmarks ==
The famous Mint Street, also known as "Thanga Salai" (Tamil: தங்க சாலை) has several landmarks, such as R Square, and Maharani Theatre. The famous Periyapalayam Mariamman Temple is also located at the start of T.H. Road and Sri Kothandaramar Temple on Perambalu Street.
