= Robinson Park =

Park in Wisconsin Rapids, Wisconsin, United States

Coordinates: 44°23′50″N 89°48′13″W

Robinson Park is an urban park located in and administered by the city of Wisconsin Rapids, Wisconsin. The park was named after Dr. F. Byron Robinson, the original owner of the site.

The park has an area of 25.5 acres (10.3 ha). Amenities include a picnic shelter and volleyball, horseshoe, swings and baseball fields.
