= Mumbai CSMT–Nagercoil Balaji Express =

Train in India

Mumbai LTT–Nagercoil Balaji Express
Overview
- Service type: Express
- First service: 1 January 1996; 30 years ago
- Current operator: Southern Railway

Route
- Termini: Mumbai LTT (LTT); Nagercoil Junction (NCJ)
- Stops: 38
- Distance travelled: 1,948 km (1,210 mi)
- Average journey time: 34hrs 55mins
- Service frequency: Bi-weekly (Note: Runs two days in a week for every direction.)
- Train number: 16351 / 16352

On-board services
- Classes: AC 2 tier, AC 3 tier, Sleeper class, General Unreserved
- Seating arrangements: Yes
- Sleeping arrangements: Yes
- Catering facilities: Available
- Observation facilities: Large windows
- Baggage facilities: Available
- Other facilities: Below the seats

Technical
- Rolling stock: LHB coach
- Track gauge: 1,676 mm (5 ft 6 in)
- Operating speed: 53 km/h (33 mph) average including halts.
- Rake maintenance: Nagercoil Junction
- Rake sharing: Rake sharing with 16339/16340 Mumbai–Nagercoil Express

The 16351 / 16352 Mumbai LTT–Nagercoil Balaji Express is an Express train belonging to Southern Railway zone that runs between Mumbai Lokmanya Tilak Terminus, Mumbai, and Nagercoil Junction in India. It is currently being operated with 16351/16352 train numbers on a bi-weekly basis.

== Service ==
- The 16352/Nagercoil–Mumbai Lokmanya Tilak Terminus Balaji Express has an average speed of 52 km/h and covers 1947 km in 37h 15m.
- The 16351/Mumbai Lokmanya Tilak Terminus–Nagercoil Balaji Express has an average speed of 55 km/h and covers 1947 km in 34h 55m.

== Route & halts ==
The important halts of the train are:

- Mumbai Lokmanya Tilak Terminus
- Thane
- Kalyan Junction
- Karjat
- Lonavala
- Pune Junction
- Daund Junction
- Solapur
- Kalaburagi Junction
- Wadi Junction
- Guntakal Junction
- Gooty Junction
- Kadapa
- Renigunta Junction
- Tiruttani
- Arakkonam Junction
- Kanchipuram
- Chengalpattu Junction
- Viluppuram Junction
- Tiruchirappalli Junction
- Dindigul Junction
- Madurai Junction
- Kovilpatti
- Vanchi Maniyachchi Junction
- Tirunelveli Junction
- Vallioor
- Nagercoil Junction

== Coach composition ==
The train has LHB rakes with a maximum speed of 130 km/h. Being an Express train its speed limit is 110 km/h.

This train is reversed in both the directions at Arakkonam Junction

The train consists of 20 coaches:

- 1 AC II Tier
- 4 AC III Tier
- 10 Sleeper coaches
- 1 Pantry car
- 2 General Unreserved
- 2 Generator cars at both end

== Traction ==
Both trains are hauled by a Kalyan Loco Shed-based WCAM-3 electric locomotives from Mumbai to Daund. From Daund, train is hauled by a Golden Rock Loco Shed-based WDP-4B diesel locomotive until Viluppuram. From Viluppuram, train is hauled by an Arakkonam Loco Shed-based WAP-4 & WAP-1 electric locomotive uptil Nagercoil, and vice versa.After getting upgraded to LHB coach now the train is running from end-to-end with Royapuram-based WAP-7 locomotive.

== See also ==
- Mumbai Lokmanya Tilak Terminus
- Nagercoil Junction railway station
- Mumbai–Nagercoil Express
