= Mumbai CSMT–Nagercoil Express =

Train in India

Mumbai LTT–Nagercoil Express
Overview
- Service type: Express
- Locale: Maharashtra, Karnataka, Andhra Pradesh & Tamil Nadu
- Current operator: Southern Railway

Route
- Termini: Lokmanya Tilak Terminus (LTT); Nagercoil Junction (NCJ)
- Stops: 33
- Distance travelled: 1,880 km (1,168 mi)
- Average journey time: 37 hours 15 minutes
- Service frequency: 4 days per week
- Train number: 16339 / 16340

On-board services
- Classes: General, Sleeper, AC 3-tier, AC 2-tier
- Seating arrangements: Yes
- Sleeping arrangements: Yes
- Catering facilities: Available
- Observation facilities: Large windows
- Baggage facilities: Available

Technical
- Rolling stock: LHB coach
- Track gauge: 1676 mm Broad Gauge
- Operating speed: 51 km/h (32 mph) average including halts.
- Rake maintenance: Nagercoil Junction
- Rake sharing: Mumbai CSMT–Nagercoil Balaji Express
Route map
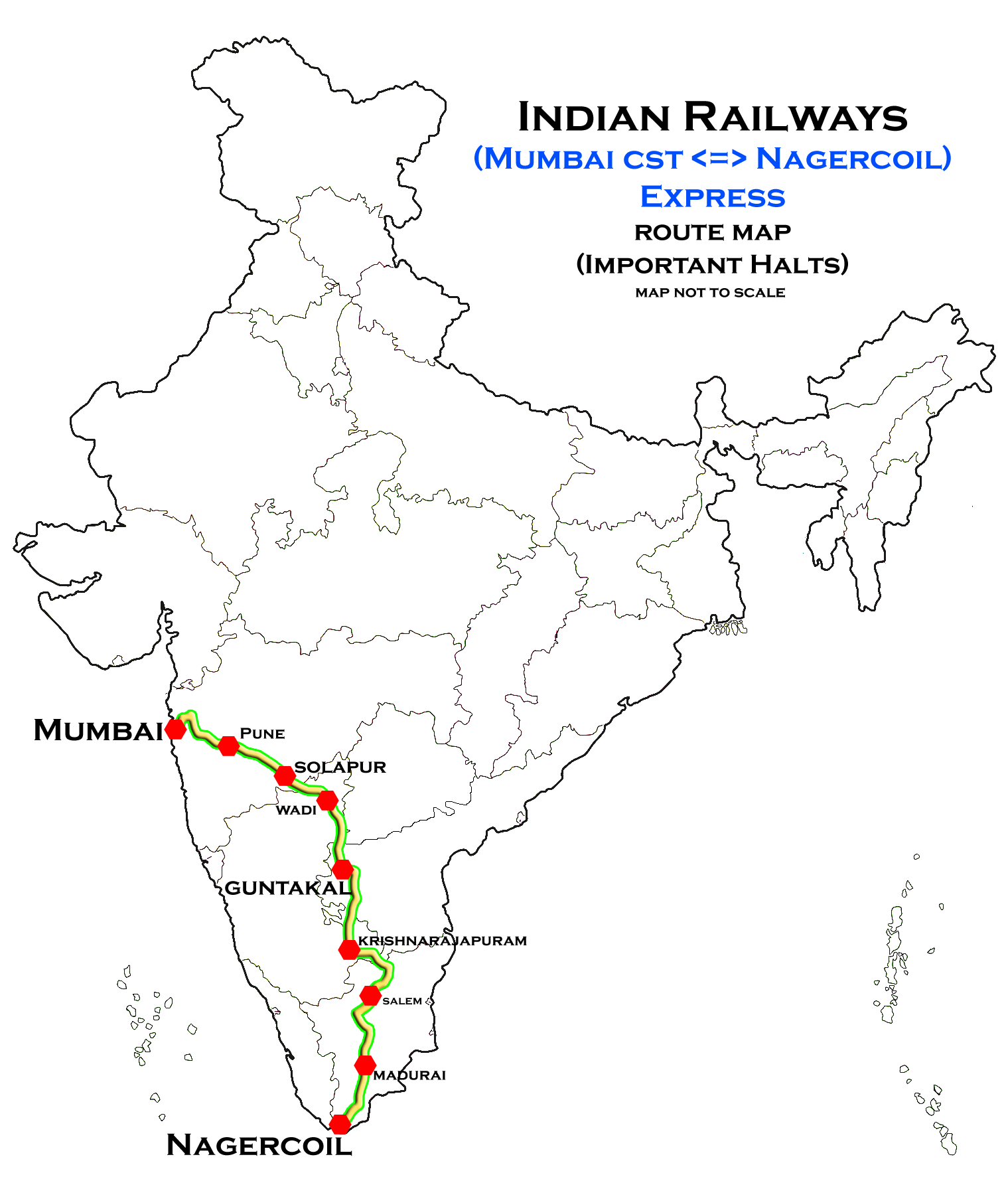

The 16339 / 16340 Mumbai LTT –Nagercoil Express runs between Lokmanya Tilak Terminus (LTT) railway station at Mumbai, Maharashtra, and Nagercoil Junction in Nagercoil, Tamil Nadu.

The main cities on the way are Tirunelveli, Virudhunagar, Madurai, Salem, Katpadi, Pakala, Dharmavaram Anantapur, Guntakal, Adoni, Solapur, Pune, Lonavala, and Thane. Additional stoppages were approved by the Railway Board in March 2026.

This train covers a distance of 1880 km. Prior to COVID 19 lockdown, this train ran via Krishnarajapuram, Yelhanka. Still, after COVID, it was rerouted via Katpadi, Pakala there by completely skipping Bangalore, due to which Bangalore lost one of the train to Mumbai Connection and Southern Tamil Nadu Connection simultaneously.

This train terminal changed from CSMT Mumbai - Mumbai CSMT to LTT Mumbai - Lokmanya Tilak Terminus in April 2026

== Route ==
This train departs Nagercoil at early morning and travels through Tirunelveli, Madurai, Dindigul, Karur, Salem, Katpadi, Pakala, Dharmavaram, Guntakal, Wadi, Solapur, Pune, and reaches its destination Chhatrapati Shivaji Terminus (Mumbai CSMT) on next late evening.

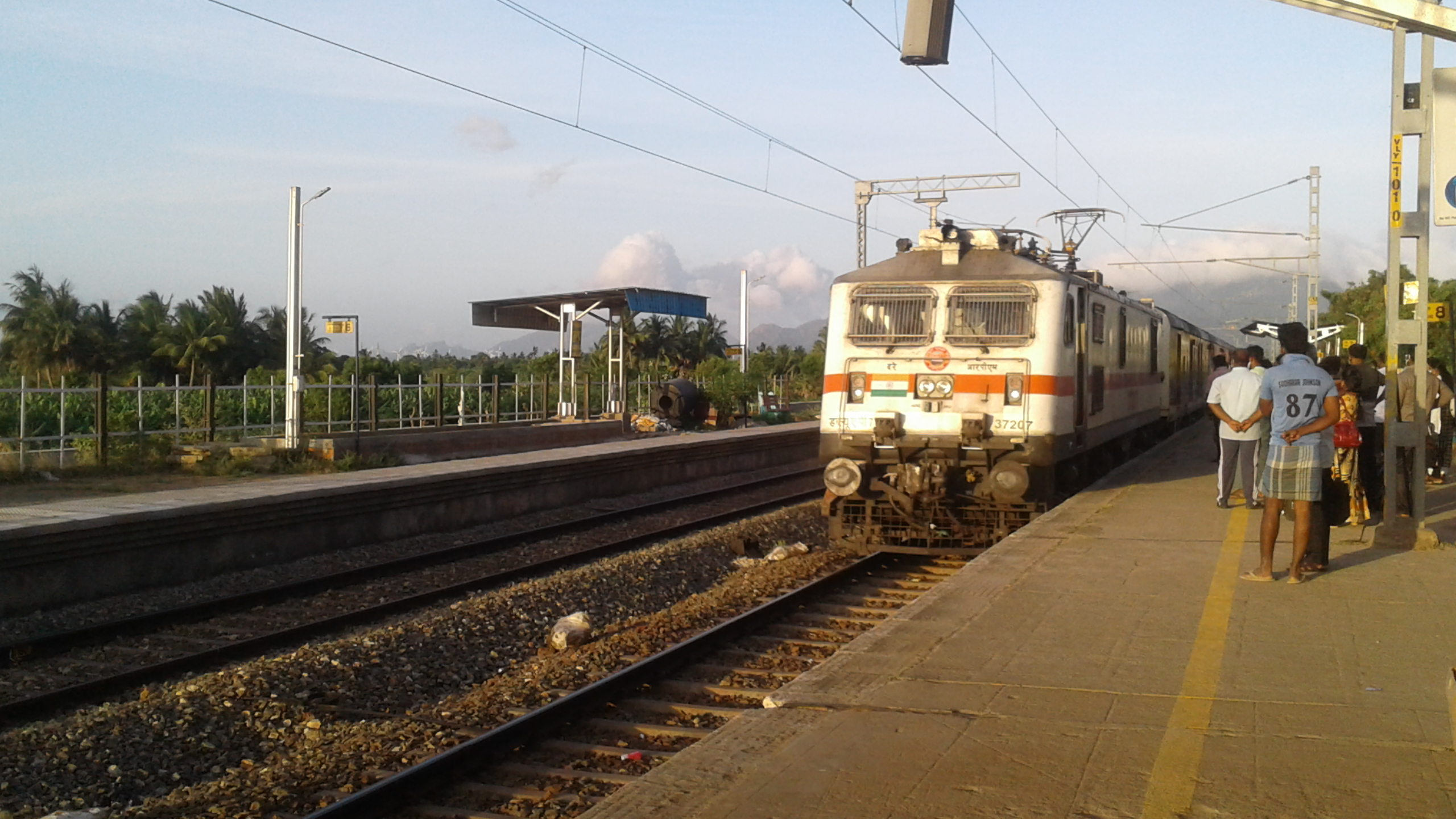
Nagercoil–Mumbai Express arriving at Valliyur railway station

== Traction ==
A Royapuram/ Erode-based WAP-7 hauls this train from Nagercoil till Katpadi Previously

From Katpadi it is hauled by Kalyan-based WDP-4 / WDM-3D twins till its destination Chhatrapati Shivaji Terminus (Mumbai CSMT)

Now end to end Royapuram/ Erode-based WAP-7 hauls this train from Nagercoil till Lokmanya Tilak Terminus

This train will get reversed at Pakala in both directions.

== Coach composition ==
It has LHB rakes with a maximum speed of 130 km/h. Maximum permissible speed: 110 km/h.

This train will be reversed at Pakala in both the directions.

It consist of 20 coaches:

- 1 AC II Tier
- 5 AC III Tier
- 7 Sleeper coaches
- 4 General Unreserved
- 1 Pantry car
- 2 EOG Generator Cars

== See also ==
- Nagercoil Junction railway station
- Daund Junction railway station
- Renigunta Junction railway station
- Chhatrapati Shivaji Terminus railway station
- Indian Railways
