= Ernavoor =

- Neighbourhood
- Ernavoor (Chennai) Ernavoor (Tamil Nadu) Ernavoor (India)
- Coordinates: 13.189600°N 80.303900°E
- Country: India
- State: Tamil Nadu
- District: Chennai
- Elevation: 26 m (85 ft)

Population (2001)
  - Total: 32,556

Languages
  - Official: Tamil
- Time zone: UTC+5:30 (IST)
- Postal Index Number: 600057
- Vehicle registration: TN-18

Ernavoor, also spelled Ernavur, is a revenue village in Tiruvottiyur taluk of North Chennai, Tamil Nadu, India. It lies in the postal area of Ennore Thermal Station, with pincode 600057. It lies between Ennore and Manali. It is part of First Chennai Corporation Zone, and has many industries such as ITC, Wimco etc.

Ernavoor got its name from Erneeswaran (Shiva) temple in this area. Most of the people in this settlement belong to working class employed in adjacent factories like ITC, Wimco, Ashok Leyland and Ennore Thermal Power Station.

There is a famous Murugan Temple and Selva Vinayagar temple in this area.
