= Kasimedu =

Kasimedu Kasimanagar
- Sub-neighbourhood
- Kasimedu (Chennai)
- Coordinates: 13°07′30.4″N 80°17′43.8″E
- Country: India
- State: Tamil Nadu
- District: Chennai district
- Elevation: 31 m (102 ft)

Languages
  - Official: Tamil, English
  - Speech: Tamil, English
- Time zone: UTC+5:30 (IST)
- PIN: 600013
- Telephone Code: +9144xxxxxxxx
- Vehicle registration: TN-04-xx-xxxx
- Neighbourhoods: Royapuram, Tiruvottiyur, Vannarapettai, Tondiarpet, George Town, Manali, Ernavoor, Ennore
- Website: https://chennaicorporation.gov.in

Kasimedu is a hamlet in the neighbourhood of Royapuram, in Chennai district of Tamil Nadu state in the peninsular India. This hamlet is occupied by fishermen whose families depend on the fishing harbour and the fish market nearby. It stretches for about 2 km, near Ennore fishing harbour along the shore, north of Chennai Port. Large numbers of victims from Kasimedu fishing community were found during the tsunami observed on 26 December 2004. Kasimedu is located at about 5 km from Chennai Beach railway station. Near about 200 tons of fishes are brought to Kasimedu, daily. State Highway 114 (Ennore Express road) passes through Kasimedu.

== Fish market ==
There is a fish market in Kasimedu. Eventhough there are so many fish markets in Chennai, Kasimedu is the famous fish market. It attracts crowds of wholesalers, retailers and common public in and around Chennai and various places of Tamil Nadu.

== Fishing harbour ==
Kasimedu has a fishing harbour. Kasimedu fishing harbour was ordered to construct, to uplift the lives of fishermen, by the former Chief Minister of Tamil Nadu M. G. Ramachandran, in the year 1975. This harbour will be upgraded by the government of India, to international standards with a project cost of ₹98 crore. About 1,000 mechanised fishing boats are available in Kasimedu.

== Neighbourhoods ==
Tiruvottiyur, Royapuram, Tondiarpet, Vannarapettai, George Town, Chennai Ernavoor, Ennore and Manali are some of the important neighbourhoods. Apart from these places, merchants and public from in and around Chennai and from other places of Tamil Nadu visit Kasimedu for procuring fishes.

== Education ==
Kasimedu has an educational institute related to study about sea viz., Central Institute of Fisheries Nautical and Engineering Training (CIFNET).
