= List of educational institutions in Sivagangai district =

== Arts and Science colleges ==
- Alagappa Government Arts College, Karaikudi
- Ananda College, Devakottai
- Arumugam Pillai Seethai Ammal College, Tiruppattur
- Dr. Zakir Husain College, Sivagangai
- Idhaya College for Women, Sarungani
- Nachiappa Swamigal Arts and Science College, Kovilur
- Raja Doraisingam Government Arts College, Sivaganga
- Sree Sevugan Annamalai College, Devakottai
- Vidhyaa Giri College of Arts and Science, Puduvayal

== Engineering colleges ==
- Alagappa Chettiar College of Engineering and Technology, Karaikudi
- Central Electro Chemical Research Institute, Karaikudi

== Educational colleges ==
- Annai Teresa College of Education, Ariyakudi

== Schools ==
- Chittal Achi Memorial Schools, Karaikudi
- Shri Vidhyaa Giri Matric Higher Secondary School Puduvayal, Puduvayal Karaikudi
- Sri Sevuga Moorthy Matric School, Ariyakudi
- St. Michael Matric Higher Secondary School, Ariyakudi
- Vidhya Giri Matric Hr Sec Shoool Karaikudi, Karaikudi
- Mount Litera Zee School, Sivagangai
