= Korukkupet =

- Neighbourhood
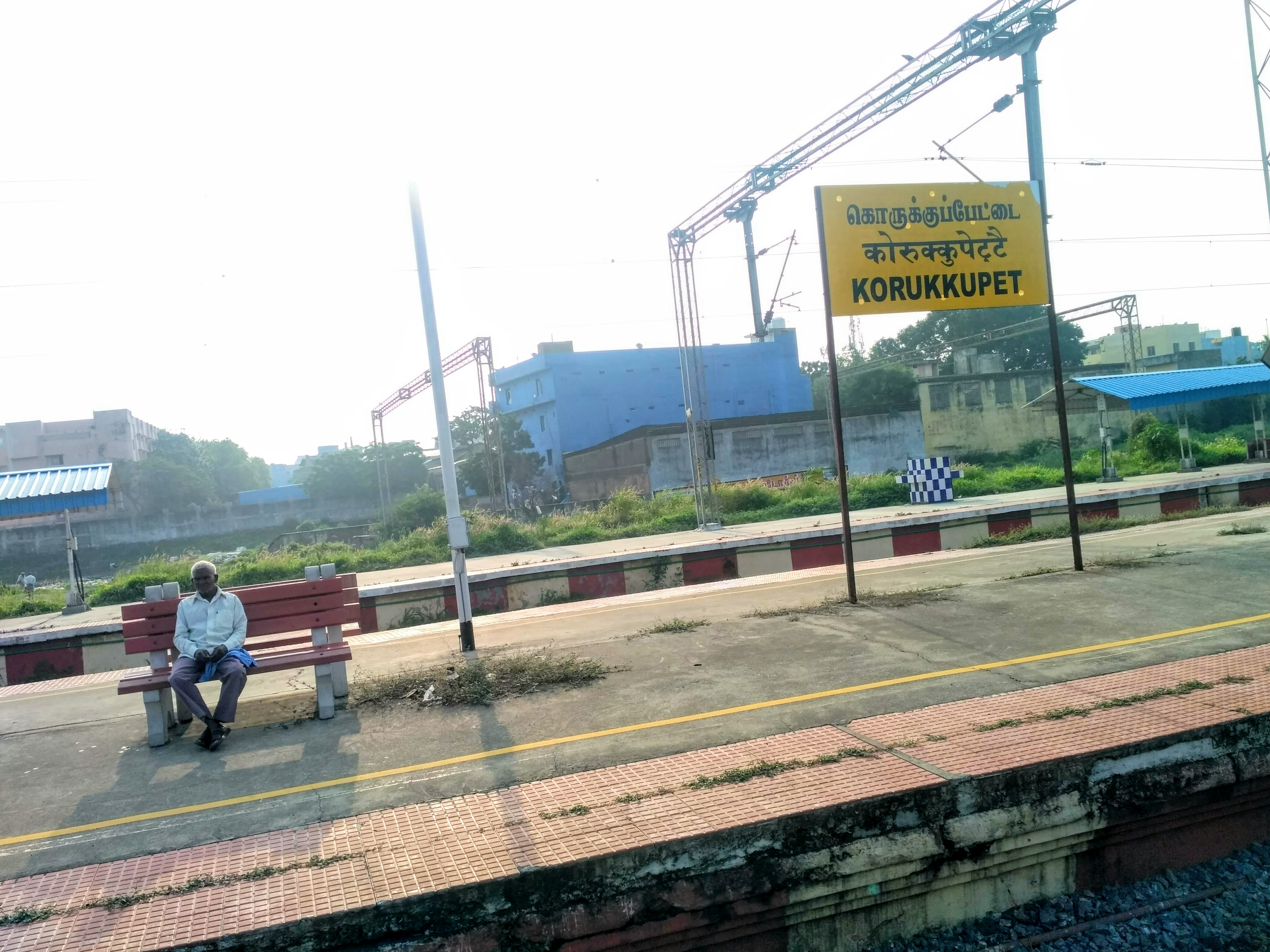
- Korukkupet railway station

- Korukkupet (Chennai) Korukkupet (Tamil Nadu) Korukkupet (India)
- Coordinates: 13.1186°N 80.2780°E
- Country: India
- State: Tamil Nadu
- District: Chennai
- Taluk: Tondiarpet
- Metro: Chennai
- Zone: Chennai
- Elevation: 52 m (171 ft)

Languages
  - Official: Tamil
- Time zone: UTC+5:30 (IST)
- PIN: 600021
- Vehicle registration: TN-03

Korukkupet is a neighbourhood in the northern part of Chennai, Tamil Nadu. It is served by the Korukkupet railway station.

== Location ==
Korukkupet shares its boundaries with Mint and Basin Bridge in the south, Tondiarpet in the north, Washermanpet in the east and Buckingham Canal and Vyasarpadi in the west.

== Infrastructure ==
As of 2010, a flyover is under construction at the Cocraine Basin Road level crossing which is expected to ease congestion in the area; however, it has been delayed. In Korukkupet, due to the proposed construction of Railway Over Bridge near Korukkupet railway station, on Manali road, the movements of Heavy vehicles, buses, for-wheelers, three-wheelers and two-wheelers are restricted towards Korukkupet railway crossing, till the year 2025 from the last week of January, 2023.

== Transport ==
=== MTC routes ===
Route number	Start	End	Via
B18	Korukkupet	Tambaram	Pallavaram, Guindy, Saidapet, SIET, DMS, TVS, Central, Beach station, Stanley, Vallalar nagar
32B	Korukkupet	V.House	Vallalar nagar, Broadway, Central, Zimson, Triplicane

=== Rail ===
The Korukkupet railway station is on the Chennai Central-Gummidipoondi/Sulurpet line.

=== Metro Rail ===
The area is located around 2 km distance from Washermanpet metro station. Now under construction of Korukkupet metro rail station in under Sir Thiyagaraya college campus, in Thiruvottiyur highway.
