= Bharathi Women's College =

College in Tamil Nadu, India

Bharathi Women's College (Autonomous)
- Type: Government College
- Established: 1964
- Academic affiliations: University of Madras
- Principal: D. Gladis
- Faculty: 180
- Students: 4000
- Location: Prakasam Salai, Chennai, Tamil Nadu, India; 11.6344°N 78.8757°E
- Campus: Urban
- Website: bwc.edu.in

Bharathi Women's College, is a women's general degree college located at Chennai, Tamil Nadu. It was established in 1964. The college is affiliated with the University of Madras. This college offers courses in arts, commerce and science.

== History ==
During the centenary celebration of Tamil poet Subramania Bharathi in 1981 and 1982 this college was renamed Bharathi Women's College. Today the college has more than 4000 students and over 180 faculty members serving in 13 departments. The college is located in the fairly large eight-acre campus, nested in the crowded George Town, Chennai. This institution caters to the needs of economically and socially weaker sections of the society, especially the first generation of women learners providing curricula as well as sports and other activities.

The college was conferred with autonomy in 1998 and was accredited by the National Assessment and Accreditation Council (NAAC) in 1999 with four-star status and subsequently it applied for re-accreditation in October 2004. A peer team constituted by NAAC visited the college and re-accredited the institution with B grade. The autonomy status was extended for the next five years for this college for the 13 undergraduate and 13 postgraduate courses by the University Grants Commission (UGC) team which visited the college in 2012. Third cycle of assessment by NAAC was done in 2015 and re-accredited with A status.

== Courses ==
=== Undergraduate courses ===
==== Science ====
- Physics
- Chemistry
- Mathematics
- Computer science
- Biochemistry
- Geography
- Botany
- Zoology

==== Arts ====
- Tamil
- Telugu
- Hindi
- English
- History
- Economics

=== Postgraduate courses ===
==== Science ====
- Mathematics
- Chemistry
- Zoology
- Applied geography
- Biochemistry
- Botany
- Computer science
- Physics

==== Arts ====
- Historical studies
- Economics
- English
- Tamil

==== Commerce ====
- Commerce (general)

=== M.Phil courses ===
- English
- Biochemistry
- History
- Geography
- Zoology

=== Ph.D. research courses ===
- English
- Biochemistry
- Geography
- Tamil
- Botany
- Historical studies

== Student welfare ==
- National Service Scheme (NSS)

The NSS of Bharathi Women's College has five units, comprising five programme officers and 500 volunteers. Inspired by the motto "Not me but you", the NSS units actively organize and participate in regular community outreach activities like awareness programmes, rallies, blood donation camps, medical camps, cleaning drives (on and off campus), wall painting, pond cleaning, collection of relief materials during time of natural disasters, observing and celebrating significant dates throughout the year in association with NSS University of Madras, Stanley Medical College, Sankara Nethralaya, Vasan Eye Care, the Election Commission, Greater Chennai Corporation, RPF, Environmentalist Foundation of India, etc.

- National Cadet Corps (NCC)

The NCC is a youth development movement which provides exposure to cadets in a wide range of activities. It emphasises social services, discipline and adventure training. The NCC is open to all regular students of the college on a voluntary basis. The motto of NCC is "Unity and discipline". The main objective of NCC training in Bharathi Women's College is to give the student an opportunity to experience the military life, discipline, basic arms training, team ethics, following orders, various kinds of physical activities, sports, tours to remote areas, etc.

- Rashtriya Uchchatar Shiksha Abhiyan (RUSA)

RUSA is a centrally sponsored scheme launched in 2013, which revolutionized higher education in India. It aims to provide strategic funding to eligible state higher educational institutions. Bharathi Women's College (Autonomous) Chennai – 600 108 accredited Grade 'A' by NAAC in April 2015 had further been empowered by funds sponsored by RUSA. In order to enhance skill development a separate component to synergise vocational education has been included to RUSA.

== College committee ==
- Student's Grievance Committee

Functions to redress the complaints and carry out suggestions given by students in matters related to students health, and other services provided by the institution

- Anti-Ragging Committee

Is constituted to look into serious matters related to violation of discipline by the students. Its rules are preventive and pro-active to avoid disorderly behaviour by the students

- Fine Arts Committee

Committee that performs and studies music, dance, drama, off stage events like rangoli, painting to build character.

- PWD Committee

This is a service oriented committee that restores, mends and repair issues related to civil work, electricity and water management.

- Internal Complaints Committee

This committee deals with dissatisfaction and objections raised by stakeholders regarding the general functioning of the institution.

== Student clubs ==
- Lions Club

Functions to serve the community at large.

- ED Club

In Entrepreneurial Development club culture is inculcated in students to initiate startups.

- Red Ribbon Club (RRC)

This is an on campus mediating body that creates awareness about HIV and encourages blood donation among students.

- Rotaract Club

This club enables development of leadership skills. It helps blending profession with service to society.

- Youth Red Cross (RRC)

Promotes noble and righteous temperament among youth. Its chief motto is to protect health and life and provide service to the sick and suffering.

- Inner-wheel Women's Club

This club integrates friendship, understanding and service to the public.

- EBSB Club

Ekta Bharat Shrestha Bharat strengthens India's diverse cultures and binds our shared traditions and values.

== Other highlights ==
- Women Empowerment Cell

This cell facilitates gender sensitization on the social, economic, political, cultural and legal fronts.

- Knowledge Resource Centre

This centre focuses on maintenance of essential information of college in databases. Data are made available as digital resources.

- Go Green

Go Green aims at advancing environmental friendly and ecologically responsible decisions.

- Honest Bazaar

Honest Bazaar seeks to enhance ethics and righteousness in buying and selling practices.

== Ranking ==
Bharathi Women's College (Autonomous), Chennai ranked under [101-150] band among colleges in India by the National Institutional Ranking Framework (NIRF) in 2021.

== Notable faculty ==
- Tmt. N. Zacharia Asiammal, IPS, deputy inspector general of police, intelligence, Government of Tamilnadu, Chennai

== Notable alumni ==
- List of Notable Alumni

== Accreditation ==
The college is recognized by the University Grants Commission (UGC).
