= Sowcarpet =

- neighbourhood
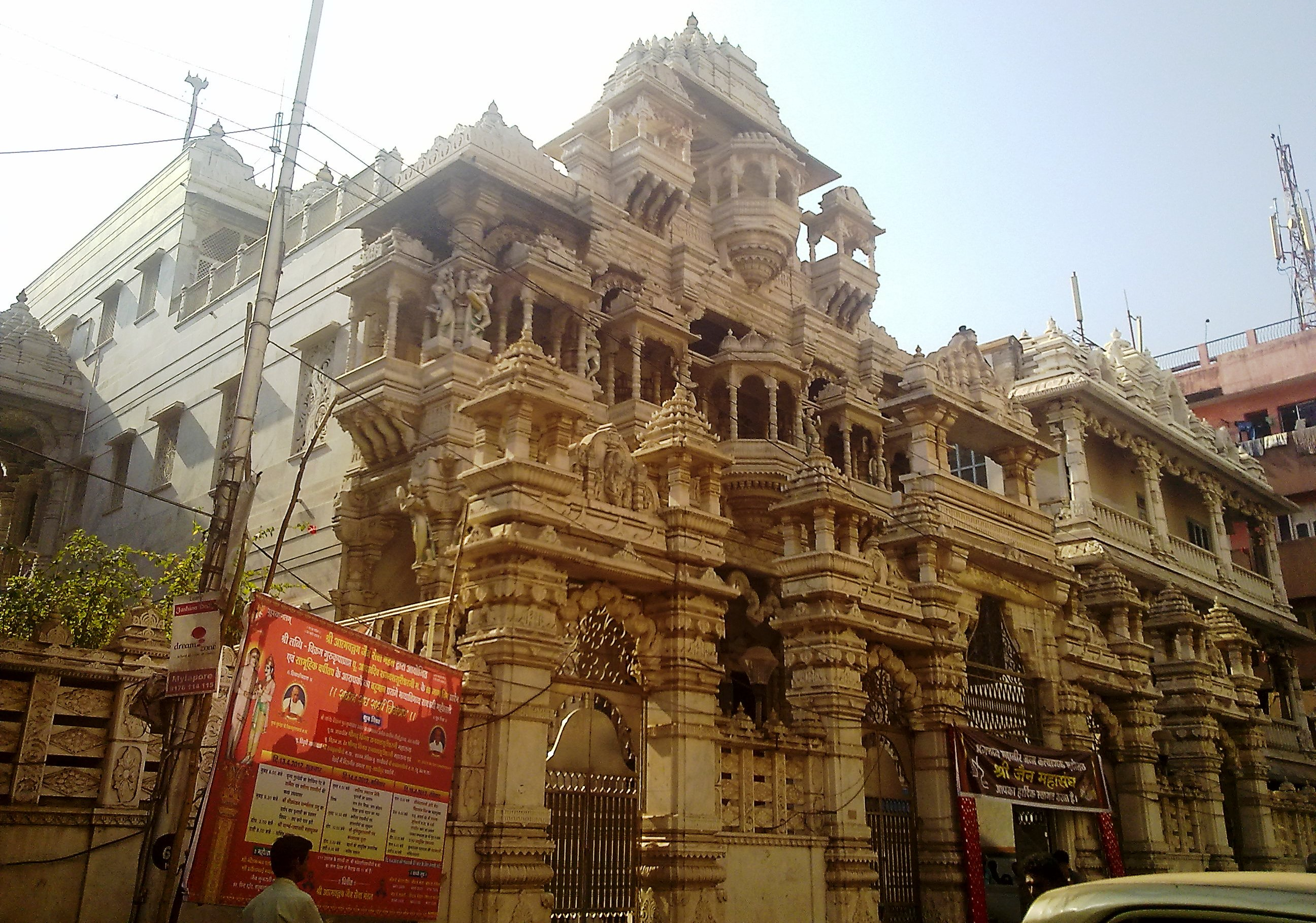
- Shri Chandraprabhu Jain temple, George Town

- Location within Chennai Location within Tamil Nadu Location within India
- Coordinates: 13.08950°N 80.27897°E
- Country: India
- State: Tamil Nadu
- District: Chennai
- Metro: Chennai
- Zone: Basin Bridge
- Ward: 30

Government
  - Body: CMDA

Languages
  - Official: Tamil
- Time zone: UTC+5:30 (IST)
- PIN: 600079
- Lok Sabha constituency: Chennai North
- Legislative assembly constituency: Harbour
- Planning agency: CMDA

Sowcarpet is a neighborhood in the northern part of Chennai, India. Sowcarpet is one of the oldest neighborhoods of the city with narrow streets and vintage buildings. It is a bustling commercial area of the city, and a range of wholesale markets are located here. The locality is known as the North Indian hub of Chennai owing to the presence of the North Indian community here. Sowcarpet is home to the largest Marwadi community in South India.

== Etymology ==
The neighbourhood derives its name from the term "sowcar" which comes from the Hindi word sahukaar, originally meaning merchant or native banker. The term now refers to a money-lender.

== History ==
Sowcarpet is a multi-layered historical landscape shaped by successive waves of domestic and international migration.

=== Early Settlers ===
The earliest Western Indian immigrants to settle in the vicinity of Mint Street were the Saurashtrians. Fleeing political instability, they established themselves in southern Tamil Nadu, and by the 17th century, relocated to Madras to engage in the textile trade of the British East India Company. During the late 1600s, Portuguese Jewish traders, led by figures such as Jacques de Paiva, established a synagogue and a Jewish cemetery on what would become Mint Street. This community acted as a bridge for the export of Golconda diamonds and the import of European silver. By 1700, the East India Company settled Telugu-speaking washers and bleachers along the street, giving the road its early name, "Washer's Street". This labor force was followed by Telugu-speaking middlemen and indigenous bankers, primarily from the Komutti and Beri Chetty communities.

=== The North Indian Mercantile Wave ===
Direct migration from Gujarat escalated in the 18th century, dominated by diamond and silk merchants. In his book Madras Rediscovered, Chennai city chronicler S. Muthiah writes that they were followed in the late 18th and 19th centuries by Marwaris and Jains originating from the Shekhawati region of Rajasthan. Entering the economy initially as pawn-brokers and money-lenders, these communities systematically purchased real estate from the departing Tamil-speaking population and established communal dharamsalas and sthanaks.

=== Infrastructure and Cultural Evolution ===
The central thoroughfare, Washer's Street, was formally renamed "Mint Street" in the 1840s when the British East India Company relocated its coin-minting operations here. The historic mint building was later converted into the Government Press.

Sowcarpet also played a foundational role in the city's arts and education. The Thondaimandalam Tuluva Vellalar (TTV) School (founded 1854) hosted Chennai's first ticketed Carnatic music concert by Maha Vaidyanatha Sivan in the 1880s, and the Hindu Theological School (established 1889) was visited by Mahatma Gandhi in 1896. During the late 19th and early 20th centuries, Mint Street emerged as a pioneer in the entertainment sector, housing early cinema halls like Crown Talkies and Murugan Theatre, which hosted the historic 1931 premiere of Kalidasa, the first Tamil talkie film.

== Description ==
Sowcarpet serves as a unique architectural and cultural contact zone, hosting ancient Tamil temples alongside North Indian Jain mandirs.

Most streets in Sowcarpet are rather narrow, with a few exceptions like Mint Street and nearby area. The buildings in the streets are so close to each other that they look like they share a common wall.

=== Religious Landmarks ===
- Sri Ekambareswarar Temple 13°05′17″N 80°16′42″E: Constructed in the 1680s by Alanganatha Pillai, an East India Company dubash, it represents the element of Earth (Prithvi) among Chennai's Pancha Bootha Sthalams.
- Kandaswami Temple 13°05′38″N 80°17′02″E: Dedicated to Lord Murugan and constructed in the early 1800s, it was immortalized by the saint Ramalinga Adigalar (Vallalar) in his Thiru Arutpa.
- Chandraprabha Swami Temple (Naya Mandir) 13.0839°N 80.2781°E: A modern Jain temple built entirely of white marble modeled directly on the Dilwara Temples of Mount Abu, Rajasthan.
- Shri Chandraprabhu Bhagwan Jain Swetamber Temple (Juna Mandir) 13°05′02″N 80°16′41″E: Dating back to the late 18th or early 19th century, this temple is built vertically to fit the narrow street grid.

=== Economy ===
Sowcarpet is the nerve center of Chennai's informal and wholesale economy, acting as the primary bulk distribution point for various consumer goods across Southern India. The turnover of the neighbourhood is estimated between ₹100,000 million and ₹150,000 million a year.

The commercial geography is highly structured with specialized marketplaces:

- Godown Street: Textiles and readymade garments.
- Kasi Chetty Street: Toys, electronics, and cosmetics.
- Narayana Mudali Street: Stationery, laces, and seasonal articles.
- Govindappa Naicken Street: Spices, groceries, and electrical goods.
- Perumal Mudali Street: Glass bangles and cosmetics.
- Rattan Bazaar: Steel utensils and silverware.

Due to the narrowness of the interior lanes, non-motorized logistics networks, particularly registered cycle rickshaws, function as the primary cargo carriers of the neighborhood, moving goods from outer transit depots to interior wholesale shops.

=== Culinary Landscape ===
Sowcarpet introduced authentic North Indian street food to Chennai's traditionally rice-dominant culinary scene. Notable multi-generational culinary landmarks include Kakada Ramprasad (established 1958) famous for its Aloo Tikki Chaat and Jalebis, Novelty Tea House (1958) which popularized Pav Bhaji in the city, and Anmol Lassi known for its saffron-infused Kesar Lassi. The lanes are also home to unique street-side innovations like the Murukku Sandwich at Sardha Chats and Mumbai-style Vada Pavs.

=== Urban Challenges ===
The rapid commercialization within an antiquated, colonial-era spatial layout has created severe infrastructural bottlenecks. A survey submitted to the Madras High Court revealed that less than 1% of the buildings in George Town complied with approved planning permits, with many eliminating mandatory setback spaces or illegally converting parking spaces into retail shops. The 2014 Misri Complex fire exposed these vulnerabilities, prompting judicial actions including orders to disconnect services and seal unauthorized structures under the Tamil Nadu Town and Country Planning Act.

== In literature ==
The internal social dynamics of Sowcarpet's migrant communities are captured in modern Tamil literature, notably in the realistic short stories of Tamil author Dilip Kumar, such as Theervu (1977), which depict the everyday struggles, diverse occupations, and linguistic assimilation of its residents, offering an authentic counter-narrative to commercial stereotypes.

== See also ==
- George Town
- Parry's Corner
- History of Chennai
