= Royapuram =

- neighbourhood
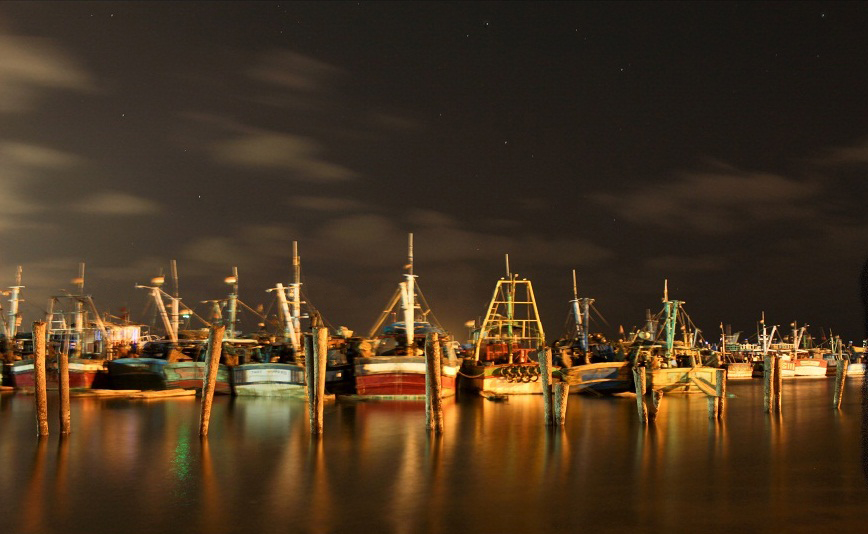
- Royapuram fishing harbour

- Location within Chennai Location within Tamil Nadu Location within India
- Coordinates: 13.10403°N 80.29366°E
- Country: India
- State: Tamil Nadu
- District: Chennai
- Metro: Chennai

Languages
  - Official: Tamil
- Time zone: UTC+5:30 (IST)
- PIN: 600 013
- Vehicle registration: TN-04

Royapuram is a neighbourhood of Chennai, India situated about 3.0 kilometres (1.9 miles) north-east of kilometre zero of Chennai city and about 2.0 kilometres (1.2 miles) north of Chennai Harbour. It is best known for the Mannarswamy Koil Street which serves as its shopping zone, the Kasimedu fishing harbour and the Royapuram Railway Station, which includes the oldest railway station building in South India.

Royapuram originated as a settlement towards the end of the 18th century when four Mudaliar clans - Nallaveeran Mudali, Mondi Mudali, Andi Mudali and Acharappan Mudali, who had recently converted to Christianity enmasse moved east from Blacktown to settle in Royapuram and constructed the St. Peter's Church in 1829 and St. Anthony' Church opposite to it. Over the next century, Royapuram grew rapidly into one of the most densely populated areas of Chennai city. By the mid-twentieth century, growth had reached stagnation point and the construction of the Chennai Moffusil Bus Terminus and Koyambedu Market between 1996 and 2002 replacing the Esplanade Bus Stand and the Kothawalchavadi wholesale market respectively sounded the death knell for the neighbourhoods of North Chennai.

Royapuram has many important landmarks - the Royapuram railway station, the Royapuram fire temple, the only functioning Parsi place of worship in Chennai city and the Ramanujan Museum. The Stanley Medical College, Sir Theagaraya College and the Bharathi Women's College are a few prominent educational institutions situated in Royapuram while Maadi Poonga and Robinson Park are some important parks in the neighbourhood.

== History ==
The region existed as a well known settlement during the Chola times, but the name Royapuram is derived from a Tamil appellation for St. Peter, Royappa, in connection with St. Peter's Church in the area. The region was originally called Rayarapuram named after the Rayar Kings who rules down South. It is also believed that the British / Anglo Indians settled in this locality were called Rayars, which lent the name Rayarpuram.

From the 14th century, the erstwhile Vijayanagara Rulers controlled this region till the Madras land grant to Francis Day.

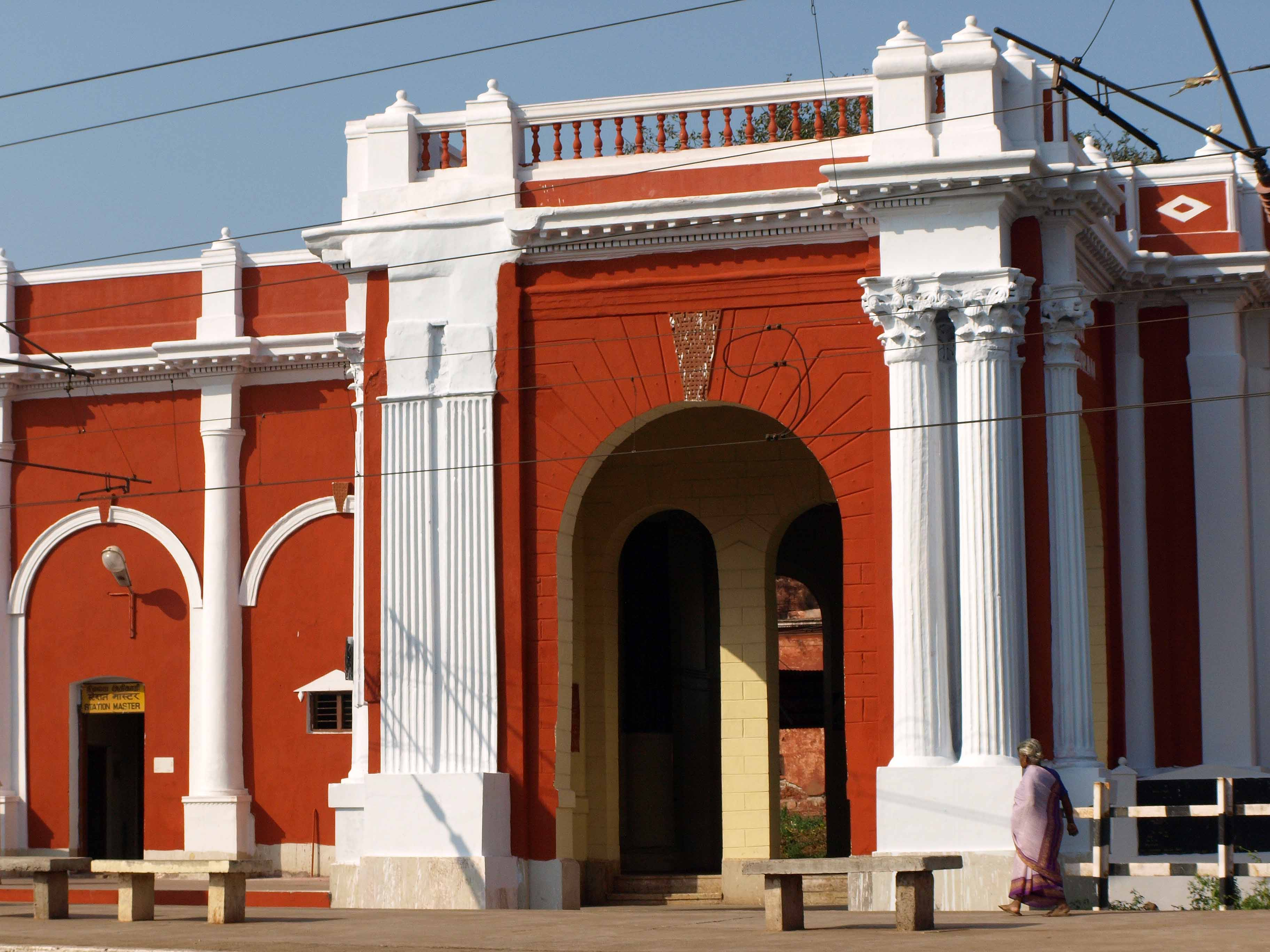
Royapuram Railway Station, opened in 1856

Royapuram Railway Station was the first railway station constructed in South India and second railway line in South Asia. The first train service commenced in 1856 from here to Arcot, the then capital of the Carnatic region.

== Politics ==
Royapuram vote by alliance in assembly elections
Year	All India Anna Dravida Munnetra Kazhagam (AIADMK)	Dravida Munnetra Kazhagam (DMK)
2006	53.3% 50,647	39.1% 37,144
2001	56.8% 44,465	39.3% 30,753
1996	35.4% 27,485	57.8% 44,893
1991	59.0% 46,218	37.8% 29,565
1989*	8.0% 6,532	46.0% 37,742
1984	50.3% 40,727	48.7% 39,432
1980	49.1% 36,455	50.3% 37,390
1977	31.3% 22,626	33.5% 24,217

== Lok Sabha politics ==
Royapuram assembly constituency is part of Chennai North (Lok Sabha constituency).
