= Vallalar Nagar =

- neighbourhood
- Location within Chennai Location within Tamil Nadu Location within India
- Coordinates: 13.1056°N 80.2799°E
- Country: India
- State: Tamil Nadu
- District: Chennai District
- Metro: Chennai

Government
  - Body: Chennai Corporation

Languages
  - Official: Tamil
- Time zone: UTC+5:30 (IST)
- Planning agency: CMDA
- Civic agency: Chennai Corporation
- Website: www.chennai.tn.nic.in

Vallalar Nagar is a neighbourhood in Chennai, India. Vallalar nagar is one of the important place in North Chennai. It is also called popularly as Mint, since the Madras treasury and mint was located here.

The nearest railway station is Washermanpet railway station. Around 400 buses operate daily in the area, with women only buses being introduced on certain routes.
