= Tondiarpet =

Tondiarpet Thandayarpet Tondipet
- neighbourhood
- Location within Chennai Location within Tamil Nadu Location within India
- Coordinates: 13.1275°N 80.2816°E
- Country: India
- State: Tamil Nadu
- District: Chennai District
- Metro: Chennai

Government
  - Body: Chennai Corporation

Languages
  - Official: Tamil
- Time zone: UTC+5:30 (IST)
- Postal code: 600081
- Vehicle registration: TN-03
- Planning agency: CMDA
- Civic agency: Chennai Corporation
- Website: www.chennai.tn.nic.in

Tondiarpet is a northern neighbourhood of Chennai, Tamil Nadu, India.

== Etymology ==
This area got its name from a famous nineteenth-century Muslim Saint Kunangudi Masthan Sahib. His birthplace is located near Thondi in Ramanathapuram District. The locals called him "Thondiar", meaning "Man hailing from Thondi". Later, Lebbai Kaadu came to be known as Tondiarpet. Hazarath Kunangudi Masthan Sahib Dargah located in Royapuram near Tondiarpet is visited by people of all faith. His writings are hailed by all people and are available in a textbook labeled as Gnana Sidhar Kunangudiar. It is available at his dargah in Royapuram.

== Location ==
The place is located in the northern part of Chennai and close to Bay of Bengal. It shares its boundaries with other important regions of Chennai including George Town, which is a couple of kilometers to the south. Chennai Airport is about 26 km away from here. The region has its own railway station, Tondiarpet Railway Station, on the Chennai Central–Gummidipoondi Line.

== Economy ==
Trade and commerce flourishes in the township of Tondiarpet. Manufacturing and distributing enterprises are abundantly found at Tondiarpet. The region has a good number of export houses which primarily deal in silk apparels and jewellery. A good number of outlets merchandising plastic ware and metal ware are prevalent in the suburbs. The region also houses the fishing harbour. The Fish Marketing Office is also situated here. The place constitutes Zone-I and houses the zonal office of the Corporation of Chennai.

== Amenities ==
The southern part of Tondiarpet has many banks and hospitals. Some medical facility providers include Apollo Hospital, Malinga Hospital, Government Peripheral Hospital, Communicable Diseases Hospital, and ESIC Hospital. A development project involving installation of public toilets, Corporation schools, gymnasia and health centres was undertaken by Corporation of Chennai in 2004, which has improved the region to a great extent.
