= Heritage structures in Chennai =

Chennai, with historically rich records dating at least from the time of the Pallavas, houses 2,467 heritage buildings within its metropolitan area (CMA), the highest within any metropolitan area limit in India. Most of these buildings are around 200 years old and older. Chennai is home to the second largest collection of heritage buildings in the country, after Kolkata. The official list of heritage buildings was compiled by the Justice E. Padmanabhan committee. The Tamil Nadu Assembly passed the Heritage Commission Act in 2012 to preserve old heritage structures.

The structures will be categorised into three grades, namely, Grades I, II, and III. Grade I structures will be prime landmarks upon which no alterations will be permitted. Under Grade II, external changes on structures will be subject to scrutiny. Buildings under Grade III may be changed for 'adaptive reuse' with suitable internal and external changes.

== Heritage activism ==
Heritage buildings are defined as notified structures of historical, architectural, or cultural significance. The heritage activism in the city began with the erstwhile Moore Market building fire in 1985. In 1997, the state government initiated action to conserve heritage buildings. In 1998, a committee headed by Director of Town and Country Planning was constituted by the government to investigate aspects related to enactment of the Heritage Act. In 1999, the committee submitted the draft of Tamil Nadu Heritage Conservation Act. In the same year, Chennai Metropolitan Development Authority (CMDA) constituted a Heritage Conservation Committee to draft regulations to conserve heritage buildings and precincts in the Chennai Metropolitan Area (CMA). After the second master plan for the city was approved by the government on 2 September 2008, special rules for conservation of heritage buildings/precincts came into force. In 2010, the criteria for listing the heritage structures in the CMA region was finalised, and in 2011, the process of assessment and documentation of heritage structures began. A 17-member Heritage Commission was set up in May 2012 to maintain these structures, after a fire accident in Kalas Mahal, a 244-year-old heritage building in front of Marina beach. As per the commission's mandate, heritage buildings that are listed will get incentives, such as exemption from payment of taxes, and offenders who deface or destroy them will face penal action.

In 2012, a list of heritage buildings was released by the Chennai Metropolitan Development Authority (CMDA) under the heritage conservation committee's (HCC) supervision. Criteria considered for notification as heritage structure include period of construction, exhibited trend, events or persons associated with the structure, and design, style, designer, physical condition, and design integrity for architecturally significant buildings. The CMDA was expected to clear the first list of 70 heritage buildings compiled by the HCC. However, in 2013, the process of notification was delayed after 65 owners objected to the inclusion of their premises in the list. The Heritage Conservation Committee, however, overruled their objections. Of the structures/precincts that figure on the list, 42 are government buildings and the remaining are private ones. The government buildings include the main building of the College of Engineering Guindy under Anna University, Madras High Court, General Post Office, Music and Dance College, Saidapet Teachers' College and King Institute of Preventive Medicine. Theosophical Society is one of the private premises that are expected to get listed as a heritage structure. When a building is notified as a heritage structure, the onus of repair and maintenance of the heritage structure will be on the structure's owner. In July 2018, documentation of the last phase covering 192 of the 467 buildings listed by Justice E. Padhmanaban Committee began.

== Grading of heritage structures ==
The heritage structures have been classified into three grades, viz. Grade I, II, and III. Grade I includes buildings and precincts of national or historical importance, with excellence in architecture, style and design. These structures remain the chief landmarks of the city. Save for some minimal changes approved by the Heritage Conservation Committee (HCC), no intervention, both on the interior and on the exterior, will be permitted in these structures. Grade II includes those structures of regional or local importance with special architectural or aesthetic merit, cultural or historical value. Although internal changes to the structures and adaptive reuse are allowed, here, too, external changes are allowed after scrutiny by the HCC. Extension or construction of additional buildings in the same plot are permissible as long as they are in harmony with the existing structure, especially in terms of facade and height. Grade III includes structures of importance for town spaces. These structures evoke architectural or aesthetic interest, but not as much as the Grade II structures. Changes to both external and internal portions of the buildings are generally permissible for Grade III buildings.

== Structures listed by the HCC ==
Prominent buildings on the HCC's list include:

- Madras High Court
- St. Thomas Cathedral Basilica, Chennai
- Anderson Church, Parry's
- Church of Our Lady of Light (Luz Church), Mylapore
- General Post Office, Rajaji Salai
- Royapuram Railway Terminal
- Theosophical Society Headquarters Building, Adyar
- City Civil Court Building, NSC Bose Road, Park Town
- Madras Engineering College (Main Building), Anna University, Sardar Patel Road, Guindy
- Bharathiyar Illam, Triplicane
- Madras Club (Moubray's Cupola), Adyar Club Gate Road

Structures that remain to be documented include:

- Loyala College, Nungambakkam
- Horticultural Society, Cathedral Road
- Royapettah Clock Tower, Chennai
- The Hindu, Anna Salai
- Kamarajar Arangam, Anna Salai
- Department of Public Instruction, College Road
- Panagal Park, T. Nagar
- Music Academy, TTK Road
- CSI School of the Deaf, Santhome High Road

Buildings on the heritage list that do not exist any more include:

- Chennai Central Prison, Park Town
- Old Sacred Heart Shrine, Pantheon Road
- Roxy Theatre, Purasawalkam High Road
- Old Jail, Prakasam Road
- Old building of Kalaivanar Arangam, Wallajah Road

== List of heritage structures ==
S.No	Building	Architectural style	Year of construction	Architect	Neighborhood	Notes	Image
1	Parthasarathy Temple	Dravidian architecture	c. 6th century CE		Triplicane	Built by Narasimhavarman I. Considered the oldest structure in Chennai.	
2	Vedapureeswarar Temple	Dravidian architecture	Before 7th century CE		Thiruverkadu	Built by the Cholas	
3	Nithyakalyana Perumal temple	Dravidian architecture	c. 7th century CE		Thiruvidandai	Built during the Pallava regime and dedicated to Varaha, the boar avatar of the Hindu god Vishnu.	
4	Descent of the Ganges	Dravidian architecture	c. 7th century CE		Mahabalipuram	One of the Group of Monuments at Mamallapuram that were designated as a UNESCO World Heritage Site since 1984.	
5	Kapaleeshwarar Temple	Dravidian architecture	c. 7th century CE		Mylapore	Built by the Pallava kings.	
6	Thyagaraja Temple	Dravidian architecture	c. 7th century CE		Tiruvottiyur	Built by the Pallava kings.	
7	Marundeeswarar Temple	Dravidian architecture	c. 7th century CE		Thiruvanmiyur	Expanded during the Chola dynasty.	
8	Porur Ramanatheswarar Temple	Dravidian architecture	c. 700 CE		Porur	Built by Kulothunga Cholan II during the Chola dynasty.	
9	Bhaktavatsala Perumal Temple	Dravidian architecture	Before 820 CE		Thirunindravur	Built during the Pallava's reign.	
10	Dhenupureeswarar Temple	Dravidian architecture	c. 957–970 CE		Madambakkam	Built during the reign of the Chola king, Parantaka Chola II, father of Raja Raja Chola I, who constructed the Brihadeeswarar Temple in Thanjavur. Consolidated with stones during the reign of Kulothunga Chola I.	
11	Masilamaniswarar Temple	Dravidian architecture	c. 9th or 10th century CE (before 970 CE)		Thirumullaivoyal	Built during the Chola era.	
12	Thiruporur Kandaswamy temple	Dravidian architecture	c. 10th century CE		Thiruporur	Built during the Pallava era.	
13	Tirusoolanathar Temple	Dravidian architecture	11th century CE		Tirusulam	Built by Kulothunga Chola I around 11th century CE.	
14	Tiruvalithayam Tiruvallesvarar Temple	Dravidian architecture	c. 11th century CE		Padi	The temple dates back to several centuries earlier. The presiding deity of the temple is revered in the 7th-century Tamil Shaivite canonical work, the Tevaram. Existing structure built during the reign of the Chola dynasty around 11th century CE.	
15	Velveeswarar Temple	Dravidian architecture	c. 11th century CE		Valasaravakkam	Constructed by Kulothunga Chola I (reigned c. 1070–1122 CE).	
16	Mylapore Karaneeswarar Temple	Dravidian architecture	c. 12th century CE		Mylapore		
17	Kundrathur Murugan Temple	Dravidian architecture	12th century CE		Kundrathur	Built by Kulothunga Chola II (r. 1133–1150 CE).	
18	Kurungaleeswarar Temple	Dravidian architecture	12th century CE		Koyambedu	Dates back to the Kulothunga Chola period (c. 1133–1150 CE).	
19	Saidapet Prasanna Venkatesa Perumal Temple	Dravidian architecture	c. 12th century CE		Saidapet	Constructed by the Balija Chetty community under the aegis of the Vijayanagara monarchs.	
20	Kundrathur Kandhalheeswarar Temple	Dravidian architecture	Before 1241 CE		Kundrathur	Details of temple renovations from time to time are found in epigraphic findings dating back 1241 CE during the Rajaraja Chola period.	
21	Kundrathur Nageswarar Temple	Dravidian architecture	12th century CE		Kundrathur	Built by Sekkilar during 12th century CE.	
22	Ekambareswarar–Valluvar Temple	Dravidian architecture	Before early 16th century CE		Mylapore	Also known as the Thiruvalluvar Temple. Built on an older structure that is said to be in existence since antiquity.	
23	Church of Our Lady of Light	Herrerian	1516		Mylapore	Built by Portuguese explorers in Mylapore Chennai and has a oldest Madonna Painting of Mary with Jesus up in the Altar.	
24	Fort St. George		1640		George Town	First major British settlements in India, leading to the foundation of the city of Madras. One of the 163 notified areas (megalithic sites) in the state of Tamil Nadu.	
25	Kalikambal Temple	Dravidian architecture	c. 1640		George Town	Originally located by the seashore and was relocated to the current site in 1640 CE. Visited incognito by the Maratha warrior Shivaji on 3 October 1667.	
26	St Mary's Co-Cathedral		1658		George Town		
27	Kandaswami Temple	Dravidian architecture	c. 1670s		George Town	Built by Maari Chettiar. The existing stone reinforcement was made during the early 1800s.	
28	St. Mary's Church		1680		Fort St. George		
29	Dargha of Sufi Saint Syed Moosa Sha Khaderi		17th century		Anna Salai		
30	Kachchaleswarar Temple	Dravidian architecture	1725		George Town	Built by Kalavai Chetty, a 'dubash' working for the British East India Company, on a land belonging to him.	
31	Chennakesava Perumal Temple	Dravidian architecture	1762		George Town	Originally dates back to 1646, along with Mallikesvarar Temple as twin temples. Rebuilt in a new location in 1762.	
32	Mallikesvarar Temple	Dravidian architecture	1762		George Town	Originally dates back to 1646, along with Chennakesava Perumal Temple as twin temples. Rebuilt in a new location in 1762.	
33	Chepauk Palace	Indo-Saracenic	Around 1764		Chepauk	The official residence of the Nawab of Arcot from 1768 to 1855	
34	Triplicane Big Mosque	Mughal	1765		Triplicane		
35	Madras Club (Moubray's Cupola)		1780s		Adyar	Originally a spacious colonial bungalow, known as Moubray's Cupola, set in 105 acres of parkland and later became the Adyar Club. Built by George Moubray on the banks of the Adyar in the 1780s.	
36	Government Museum Buildings	Indo-Saracenic	1789	Henry Irwin	Egmore	Constructed between 1789 and 1890	
37	Amir Mahal	Indo-Saracenic	1798		Royapettah		
38	Government Central Press		1807		George Town		
39	Thousand Lights Mosque		1810		Anna Salai		
40	Egmore Eye Hospital		1819		Egmore		
41	St Andrew's Church	Georgian church architecture	1821	Major De Havilland	Egmore	Built at a cost of 20,000 UK pounds	
42	Police headquarters		1839		Mylapore	Renovated in 1993.	
43	Tamil Nadu Police Museum	Indo-Saracenic	1842		Egmore		
44	Christ Church		1844		Anna Salai	Possibly the first congregation outside Fort St George.	
45	Higginbotham's		1844		Anna Salai	The first and the oldest existing book shop in India.	
46	Anderson Church		1845		Parry's Corner		
47	Government College of Fine Arts and Crafts	Indo-Saracenic	1850	Robert Fellowes Chisholm	Egmore	The first school of arts in Asia	
48	Royapuram railway station		1853		Royapuram	Designed by William Adelpi Tracey. Third oldest railway station in the country and the oldest in South India.	
49	The Mail		1868		Anna Salai		
50	Chennai Central railway station	Gothic Revival	1873	George Harding	Park Town	Built as a second terminus to decongest the Royapuram harbour station, which was being utilised for port movements. Built in a combination of styles, namely, Gothic and Romanesque.	
51	Senate House, University of Madras	Indo-Saracenic	1879	Robert Fellowes Chisholm	Chepauk	Incorporates many elements of the Byzantine style. The great hall of the Senate House is of immense height and proportions, considered to be the finest of its kind in India.	
52	P Orr & Sons		1879		Anna Salai		
53	Deputy Inspector General of Registration		1880		George Town	Housed registration department offices. Spread over 20,000 sq ft.	
54	Theosophical Society Headquarters Building		1882		Adyar		
55	The Hindu		1883		Anna Salai		
56	General Post Office	Victorian Architecture	1884	Robert Fellowes Chisholm	George Town	Built at a cost of ₹ 680,000.	
57	Victoria Public Hall	Indo-Saracenic	1888-1890	Robert Fellowes Chisholm	Park Town	The venue of the first cinema show in Chennai.	
58	Madras High Court	Indo-Saracenic	1892	J. W. Brassington, Henry Irwin	George Town	The court buildings are believed to be the second largest judicial complex in the world after the one in London. The complex also houses the largest number of courts in Asia.	
59	St. Thomas Cathedral Basilica, Chennai	Gothic revival architecture	1896	Caption J. A. Power	Santhome	Built over the reputed tomb of Saint Thomas the Apostle by Portuguese explorers in 1523, and later rebuilt by the British in 1893. It is considered to be the oldest church in Chennai.	
60	Bharat Insurance Building	Indo-Saracenic	1897		Anna Salai	Originally known as Kardyl Building	
61	State Bank of India Building	Victorian Architecture	1897	Col. Samuel Jacob	George Town		
62	Red Fort building at the Madras Medical College		1897		Park Town		
63	King Institute of Preventive Medicine and Research		1899		Anna Salai, Guindy		
64	Dobbin Hall		1904–05			Madras Veterinary College (now located opposite) started functioning.	
65	National Art Gallery	Indo-Saracenic	1906	Henry Irwin	Egmore		
66	Egmore Railway Station	Indo-Saracenic	1908	Henry Irwin	Egmore		
67	Madras Record Office	Indo-Saracenic	1909	G. S. T. Harris	Egmore	Currently known as Tamil Nadu Archives/Department of Archives & Historical Research	
68	Royapuram fire temple		1910	Hormusji Nowroji	Royapuram	The first and the only fire temple in the city.	
69	Ripon Building	Indo-Saracenic	1913	G.S.T Harris	Park Town	Built at a cost of ₹ 750,000.	
70	Kilpauk Water Works		1914		Kilpauk	First water treatment facility with 80 mld capacity.	
71	Gove Building (formerly Cuddon Building)		1916		Anna Salai		
72	Egmore court complex		1916		Egmore	Indo-Saracenic style of architecture. Spread over 8,640 square feet, it housed the Chief Metropolitan Magistrate Court, three additional Chief Metropolitan Magistrate courts and 10 magistrate and fast track courts. Restored in 2018 at a cost of ₹ 48 million. The same year, a new 6-storied 71,200-square-feet building, with 12 court halls, was constructed at the premises as additional court complex.	
73	College of Engineering	Indo-Saracenic	1920		Guindy	Designed by consulting architect W. H. Nicholls and later by chief engineer F. J. Wilson.	
74	Southern Railway headquarters	Indo-Saracenic	1921	N. Grayson	Park Town	Originally built as the new Madras and Southern Mahratta Railway Company (MSMR) headquarters (successor of Madras Railway Company), replacing the general office of MSMR at Royapuram Railway Station. Built for the first time in India in reinforced concrete in classical and Dravidian styles.	
75	Suguna Vilasa Sabha		1936		Anna Salai	Possibly one of the earliest drama theatres with stalwarts like Pammal Sambanda Mudaliar — now called SVS Club.	
76	Bharathi Illam				Triplicane		

== See also ==
- Architecture of Chennai
- Heritage conservation
- Architectural conservation
