= Architecture of Chennai =

Architectural style

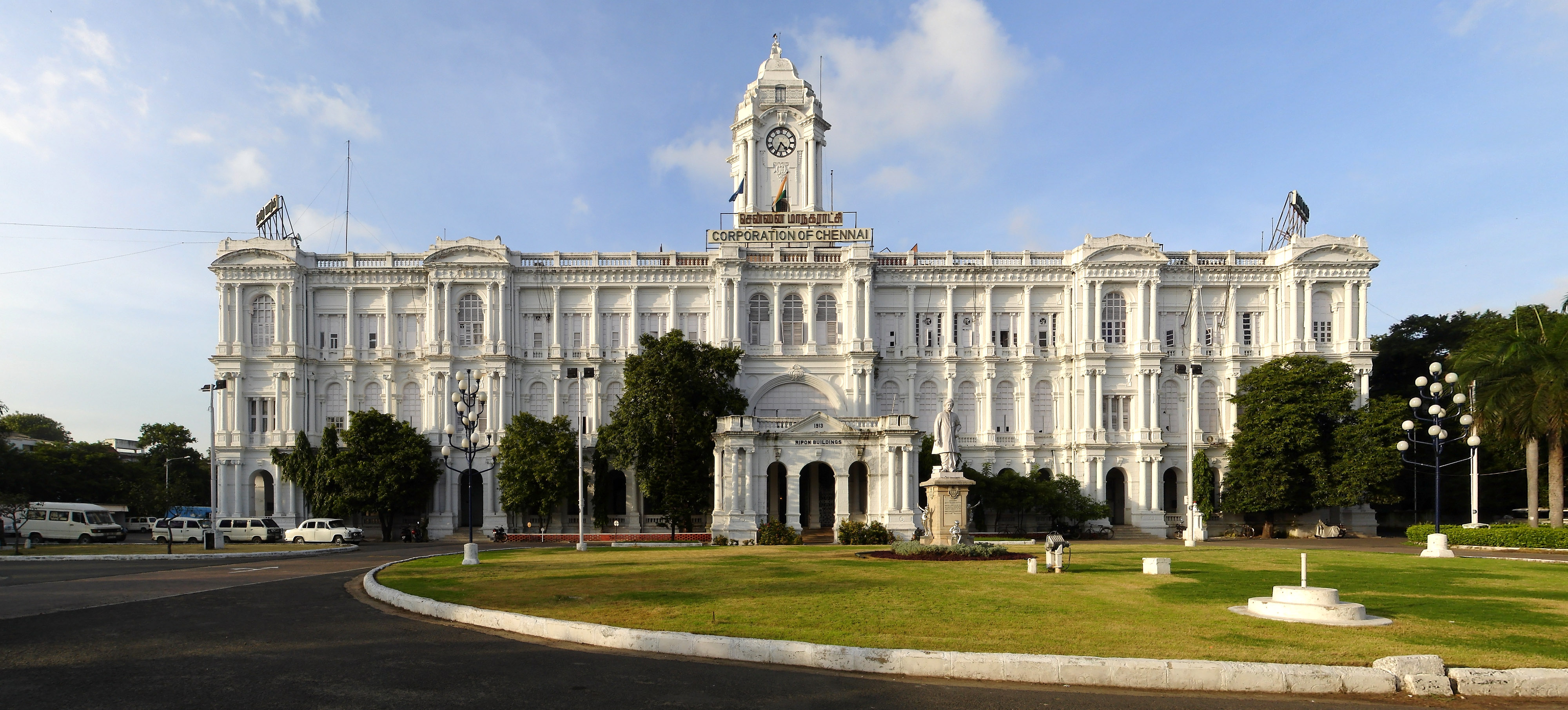
The Ripon Building, Chennai, an example of the Indo-Saracenic architectural style found in the city.

Chennai architecture is a confluence of many architectural styles from ancient Tamil temples built by the Pallavas to the Indo-Saracenic style (pioneered in Madras) of the colonial era, to 20th-century steel and chrome of skyscrapers. Chennai has a colonial core in the port area, surrounded by progressively newer areas as one travels away from the port, punctuated with old temples, churches and mosques.

As of 2014, Chennai city, within its corporation limits covering 426 sq. km, has about 625,000 buildings, of which about 35,000 are multi-storied (with four and more floors). Of these, nearly 19,000 are designated as commercial ones.

== Brief history ==
The European architectural styles, such as Neo-Classical, Romanesque, Gothic and Renaissance, were brought to India by European colonists. Chennai, being the first major British settlement in the Indian subcontinent, witnessed several of the earliest constructions built in these styles. The initial structures were utilitarian warehouses and walled trading posts, giving way to fortified towns along the coastline. Although several European colonists, namely, Portuguese, Danish and French, initially influenced the architectural style of the region, it was chiefly the British who left a lasting impact on the city's architecture succeeding the Mughals in the country. They followed various architectural styles, with Gothic, Imperial, Christian, English Renaissance and Victorian being the essentials.

Starting with factories, several types of buildings such as courts, educational institutions, municipal halls, and dak bungalows were built, most of which were ordinary structures built by garrison engineers. Churches and other public buildings displayed a more nuanced architecture. Most of the buildings were adaptations of the buildings designed by leading British architects of that time like Wren, Adam, Nash and others in London and other places. For instance, the Pachaiyappa's Hall in Chennai was modelled on the Athenium Temple of Theseus. Unlike Europe, these buildings were built mostly of brick and stuccoed with lime, with "facades" sometimes incised to resemble stones. Some later buildings, however, were built with stones. Several churches were built based on London prototypes, with variations as highly original works. The earliest example is the St. Mary's Church in Fort St. George.

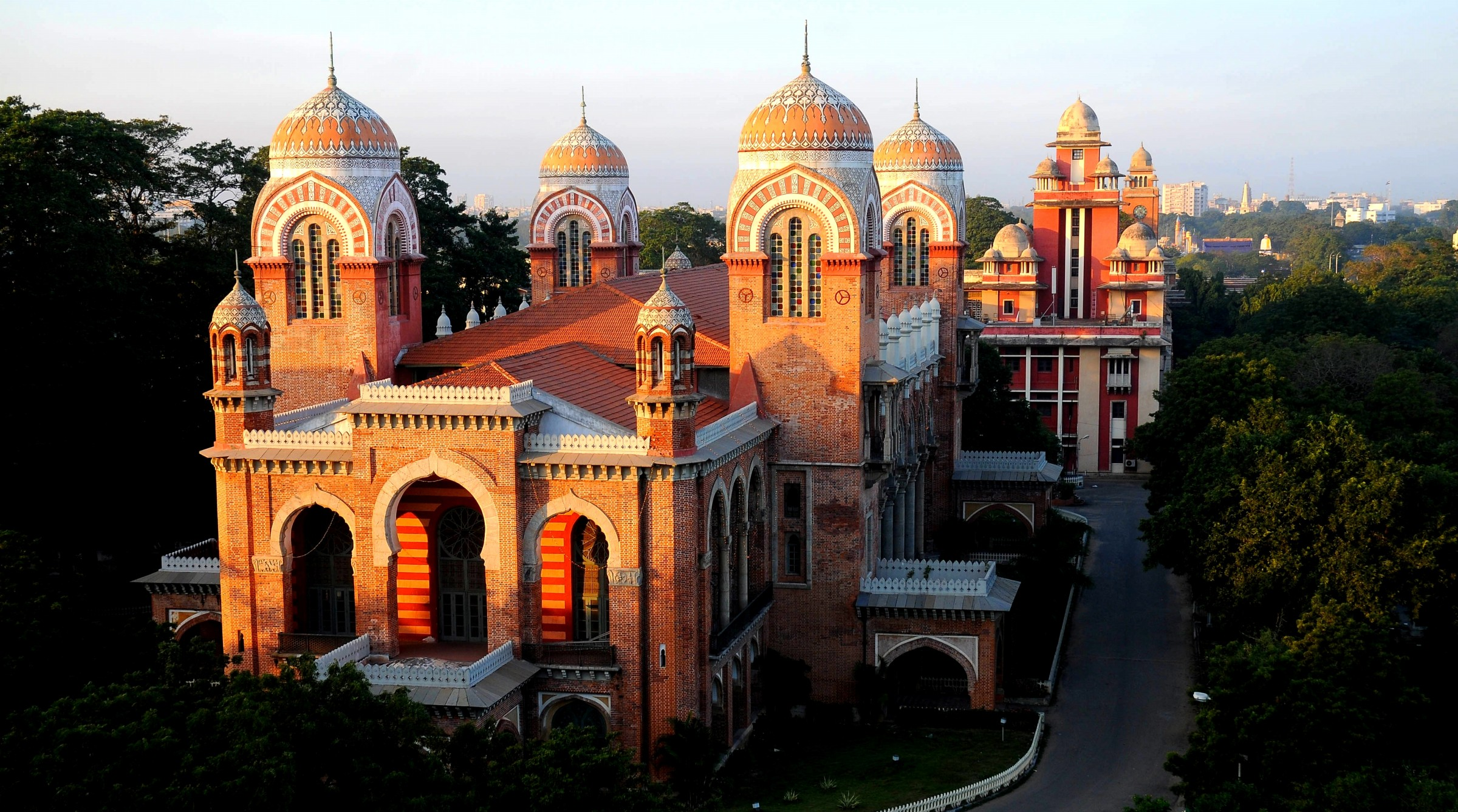
The Senate House at the University of Madras.

The transfer of power to the British Crown from the English East India Company, the rise of Indian nationalism and the introduction of railways marked several milestones in the history of British Colonial Indian architecture. New materials like concrete, glass, wrought and cast iron were being increasingly used in construction, which opened up new architectural possibilities. Native Indian styles were assimilated and adopted in the architecture. All these factors led to the development of Indo-Saracenic architecture towards the end of the 19th century. Victorian in essence, it borrowed heavily from the Islamic style of Mughal and Afghan rulers, and was primarily a hybrid style that combined diverse architectural elements of Hindu and Mughal with gothic cusped arches, domes, spires, tracery, minarets and stained glass. F. S. Growse, Sir Swinton Jacob, R. F. Chisholm and H. Irwin were the pioneers of this style of architecture, of whom the latter two designed several buildings in Chennai. The Chepauk Palace, designed by Paul Benfield, is said to be the first Indo-Saracenic building in India. Other outstanding examples of this style of architecture include the Law Courts, Victoria Memorial Hall, Presidency College and the Senate House of the University of Madras.

== Styles of architecture ==
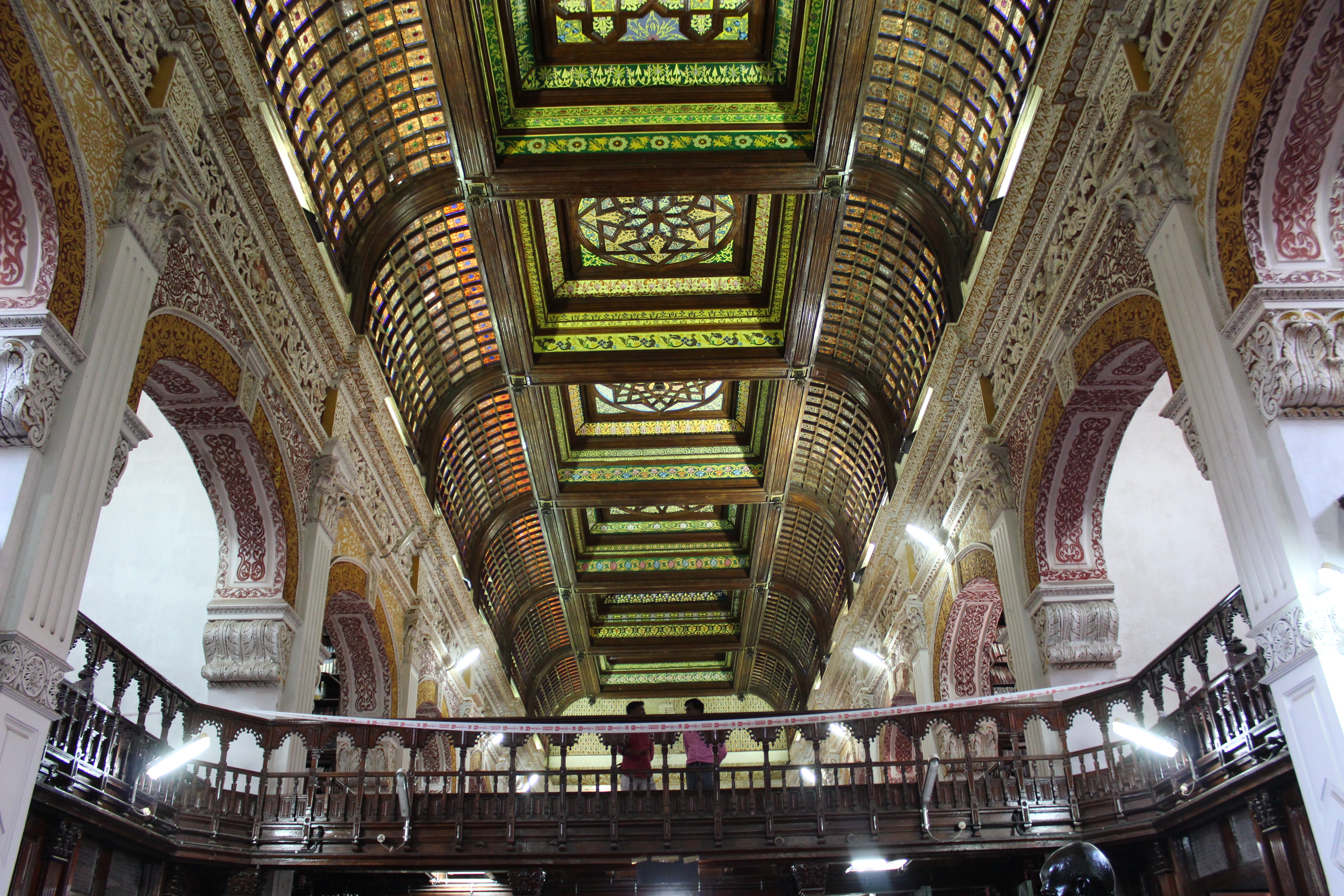
Interior of the Connemara Public Library

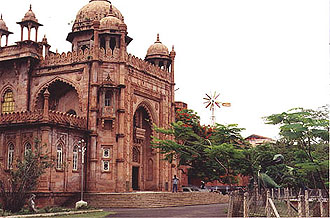
The Government Museum, Egmore, in the Indo-Saracenic style.

The Indo-Saracenic style of architecture dominated Chennai's building style just as Gothic style dominated Mumbai's building style, before the advent of Art Deco style. After the Indo-Saracenic, the Art Deco was the next great design movement to impact the city's skyline and it made way for the international and modern styles. Just as Bombay developed an intermediary style that combined both the Gothic and Art Deco, so too did Chennai with a combination of Indo-Saracenic and Art Deco in the University Examination Hall, the Hindu High School and Kingston House (Seetha Kingston School). However, many buildings are either being defaced by modern ornamentation or being completely demolished to make way for new constructions. An example is the Oceanic Hotel which was classic Art Deco and which has since been razed to the ground for an IT park. The language department of the University of Madras is another.

=== Indo-Saracenic and colonial style ===
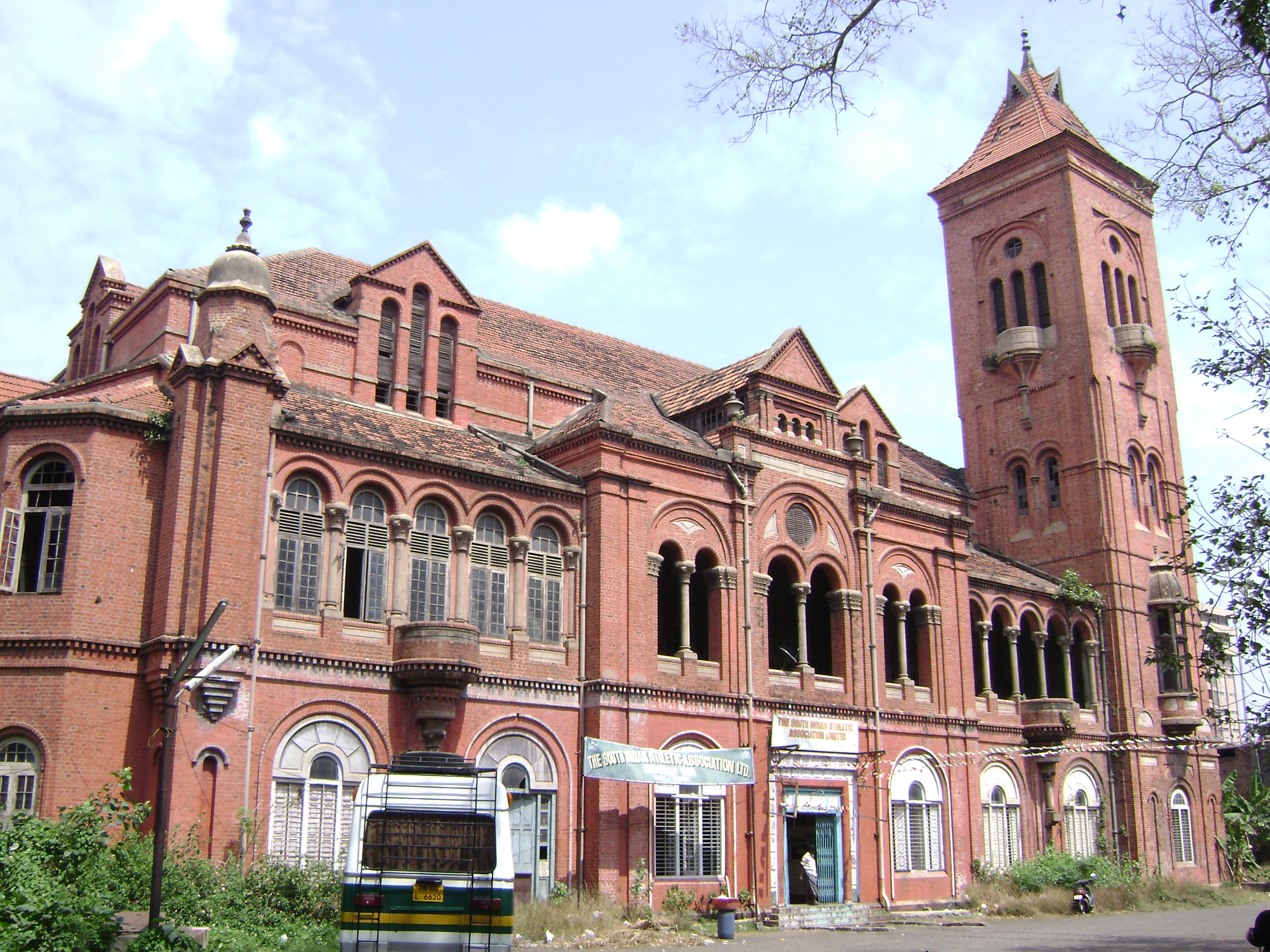
Victoria Public Hall, Chennai

In the city, one can notice the British influence in the form of old cathedrals and the mix of Hindu, Islamic and Gothic revival styles that resulted in the Indo-Saracenic style of architecture. Many of the colonial era buildings are designed in this style. The colonial legacy of Chennai is most apparent in the vicinity of the port. South of the port is Fort St George. The stretch between the fort and the port is occupied mostly by the High Court buildings and several clubs, some of which have existed since the British era. A little south of the fort, across the Cooum River, is the Chepauk cricket stadium, another British staple, dating from 1916. North and west of the port is George Town, where dockyard workers and other manual labourers used to live. George Town is now a bustling commercial centre, but its architecture is significantly different from areas closer to the fort, with narrower roads and tightly packed buildings. Most of the colonial-style buildings are concentrated in the area around the port and Fort St George. The remaining parts of the city consist of primarily modern architecture in concrete, glass and steel.

The Chepauk Palace, designed by Paul Benfield, is said to be the first Indo-Saracenic building in India. However, most of the Indo-Saracenic structures in the city were designed by English architects Robert Fellowes Chisholm and Henry Irwin and can be seen across the city, especially in areas such as Esplanade, Chepauk, Anna Salai, Egmore, Guindy, Aminjikarai and Park Town. Prominent structures in the Esplanade region include the Madras High Court (built in 1892), the General Post Office, State Bank of India building, Metropolitan Magistrate Courts, YMCA building, and the Law College. Chepauk area is equally dense with these structures with Senate House and library of the University of Madras, Chepauk Palace, PWD Buildings, Oriental Research Institute and the Victoria Hostel. Southern Railway headquarters, Ripon Building, the Victoria Public Hall, and the Madras Medical College's anatomy block are examples of Indo-Saracenic-style structures found in Park Town. Structures such as Bharat Insurance Building, Agurchand Mansion and the Poombhuhar Showroom are found along the Anna Salai, and Amir Mahal is in Triplicane. Structure found in Guindy include College of Engineering and Old Mowbrays Boat Club. Egmore is dotted with several such structures including the Government Museum, Metropolitan Magistrate Court, Veterinary College, State Archives building, National Art Gallery, and College of Arts and Crafts. St. George's School Chapel and the Southern Railway Offices in Aminjikarai are other examples of the Indo-Saracenic structures in the city.

=== Art Deco ===
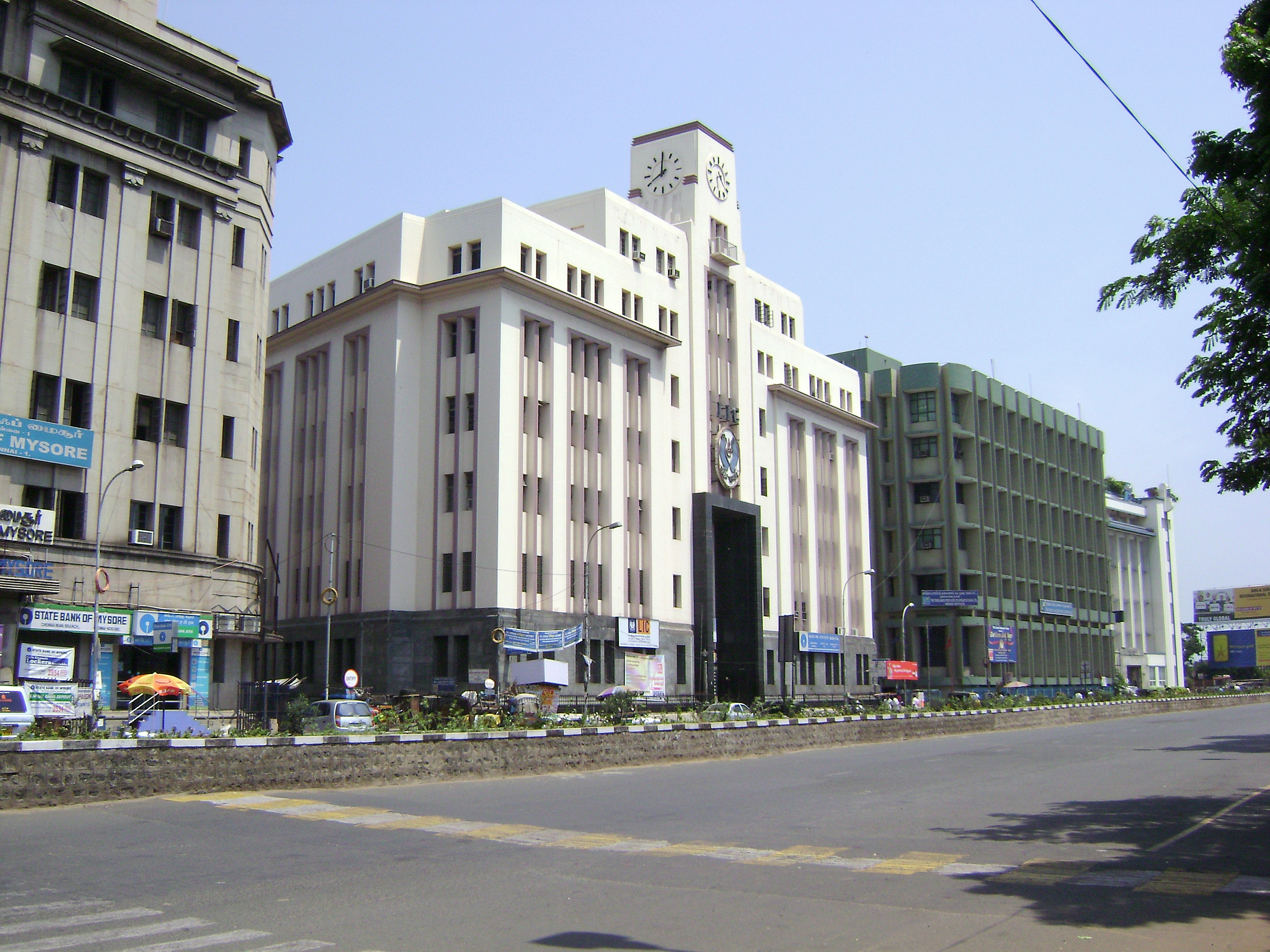
Art Deco buildings in Parrys Corner

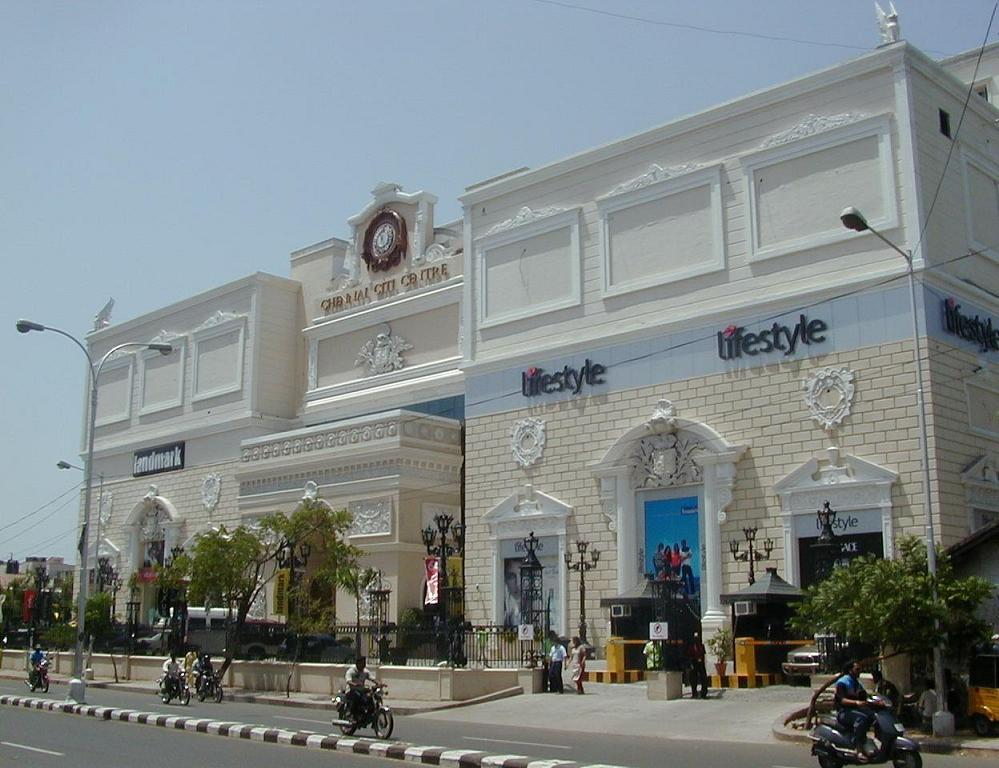
A Neo Classical architecture example of Citi Centre Mall

In the early 20th century, several major modern institutions such as banking and commerce, railways, press and education were established in the city, mostly through colonial rule. The architecture for these institutions followed the earlier directions of the Neo-Classical and the Indo-Saracenic. The residential architecture was based on the bungalow or the continuous row house prototypes. From 1930s onwards, many buildings in George Town were built in the Art Deco style of architecture. Art Deco, a popular international design movement that flourished between the 1920s and 1940s, was adapted by cities such as Bombay and Madras almost immediately.

Although Chennai does not have a uniform art deco skyline like the way Mumbai does, the city has significant pockets that are clearly completely art deco. A long stretch along NSC Bose Road beginning from EID Parry and a similar stretch along the Esplanade used to have several examples of public buildings in the art deco style. Yet another instance is along the stretch of Poonamallee High Road between Chennai Central and Chennai Egmore railway stations. Similarly there are many areas in south Chennai with bungalows designed in similar fashion. Some early examples are the United India building (presently housing LIC) and the Burma Shell building (presently the Chennai House), both built in the 1930s along Esplanade. The Dare House, the most famous landmark at the junction of NSC Bose Road and First Line Beach Road, was built in 1940 as the office of the Parry's company. It is after which the area is named Parry's Corner. These buildings were departures from earlier models in that they were planned without external verandahs and incorporated new technology such as the lift. Cantilevered porches that showcases the potential of concrete are also seen in some structures. Externally, the stylistic devices such as stepped motifs and sweeping curves used in areas like grilles, parapet walls along with vertically proportioned windows impart a coherent appearance. Attempts to Indianise Art Deco also led to elegant, decorative buildings like the Oriental Insurance building of the 1930s. Situated at one of the corners of Armenian Street, it imposes delicately with its chattri (domed pavilion) and projecting ornamented balconies. Such a direction is sometimes termed the 'Indo-Deco'. Art Deco continued into the 1950s too, with the Bombay Mutual building (presently housing LIC) along NSC Bose Road and the South Indian Chamber of Commerce building on Esplanade being built during this period.

Art Deco buildings located at road junctions had curvilinear profiles. This approach is sometimes considered a separate style, the Streamline Moderne, inspired by the streamlining of aeroplanes, bullets, ships, and the like, due to principles such as aerodynamics. Apart from the Dare House, other buildings that portraits these characteristics are those along the junctions of Mount Road like the Bharath Insurance building of the 1930s and shops such as the current Bata showroom. Also along Mount Road and adjoining areas are other types of Art Deco buildings, The Hindu office with its stepped form and Connemara Hotel built between 1934 and 1937 are city landmarks. While cinema had come to Chennai in the early 20th century, the later cinema buildings offered yet another platform for the exposition of Art Deco. Casino Theatre and Kamadhenu Theatre of the 1950s stand testimony to this era. The Art Deco house in the city features sweeping porches, stepped corner windows, circular windows and rooms, and projecting staircase areas, with the furniture within the houses having motifs in order to resonate with the larger theme. Houses of the middle and lower income group too aspired towards such expressions as is evident in the City Improvement Trust project of Mambalam and the houses at Gandhinagar. Art Deco continued in the city into the late 1950s, when modernism had started gradually rooting itself. Art Deco served as the base from which modernism took off.

=== Agraharam architecture ===
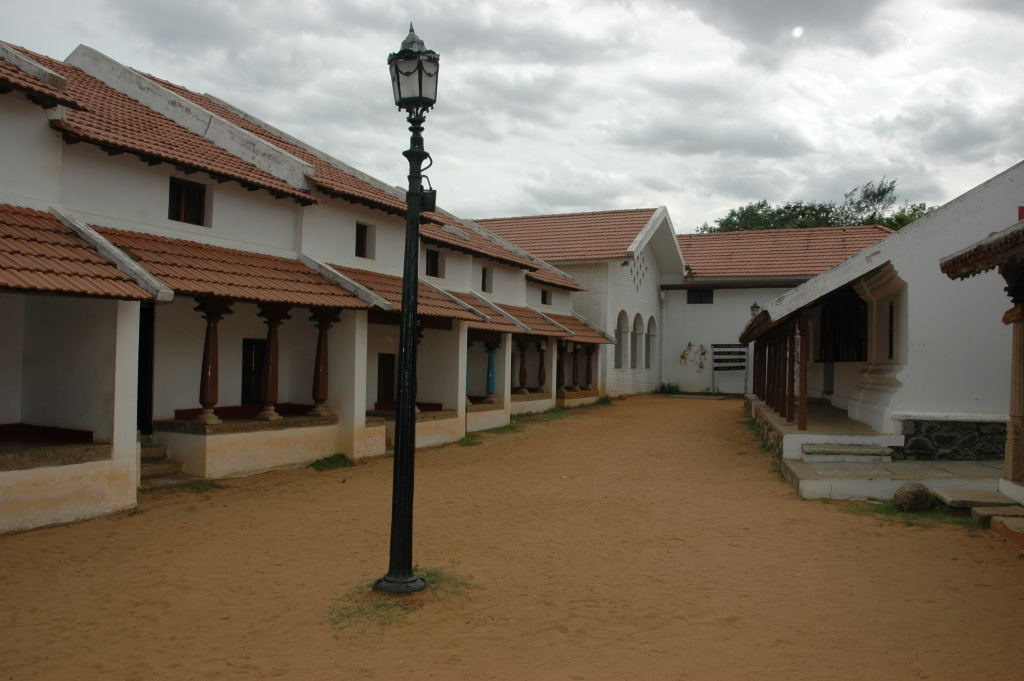
The agraharam architecture

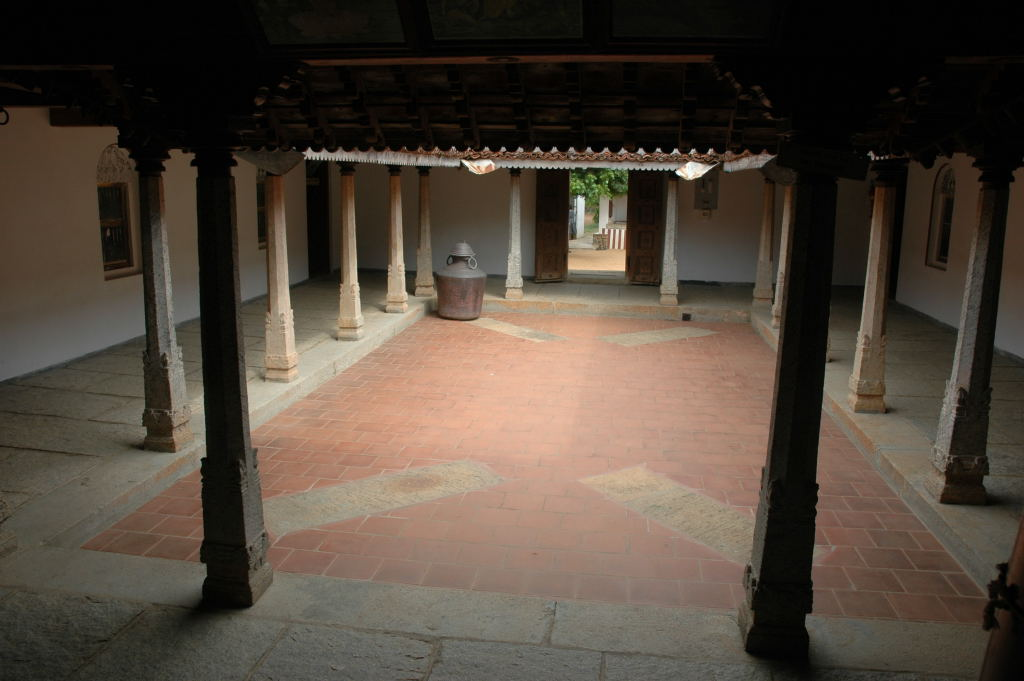
Inside an agraharam house

Some residential areas like Tiruvallikeni (Triplicane) and Mylapore have several houses dating from the early 20th century, especially those far removed from arterial roads. Known as the Agraharam, this style consists of traditional row houses usually surrounding a temple. Many of them were built in the traditional Tamil style, with four wings surrounding a square courtyard, and tiled sloping roofs. In sharp contrast, the apartment buildings along the larger roads in the same areas were built in 1990 or later.

Typically, agraharams can be seen where an entire street is occupied by Brahmins, particularly surrounding a temple. The architecture is distinctive with Madras terraces, country tile roofing, Burma teak rafters and lime plastering. The longish homes consisted of the mudhal kattu (receiving quarters), irandaam kattu (living quarters), moondram kattu (kitchen and backyard) and so on. Most houses had an open to sky space in the centre called the mitham, large platforms lining the outside of the house called the thinnai and a private well in the backyard. The floors were often coated with red oxide and sometimes the roofs had glass tiles to let in light. The agraharam quadrangle seen in Triplicane is around the Parthasarathy Temple and its tank, while that of Mylapore is centred around the Kapaleeshwarar Temple and its tank. About 50 families continue to live in the agraharams in Triplicane. However, many of these houses are being replaced with modern multi-storied apartments, resulting in a reduction in their numbers. Traditional vernacular architecture can be found in some of the Agraharam houses in Mylapore, Triplicane, and Tiruvanmiyur. As of 2018, a team of architects and volunteers has documented traditional vernacular architectural designs of about 50 houses in Mylapore.

=== Post-Independence ===
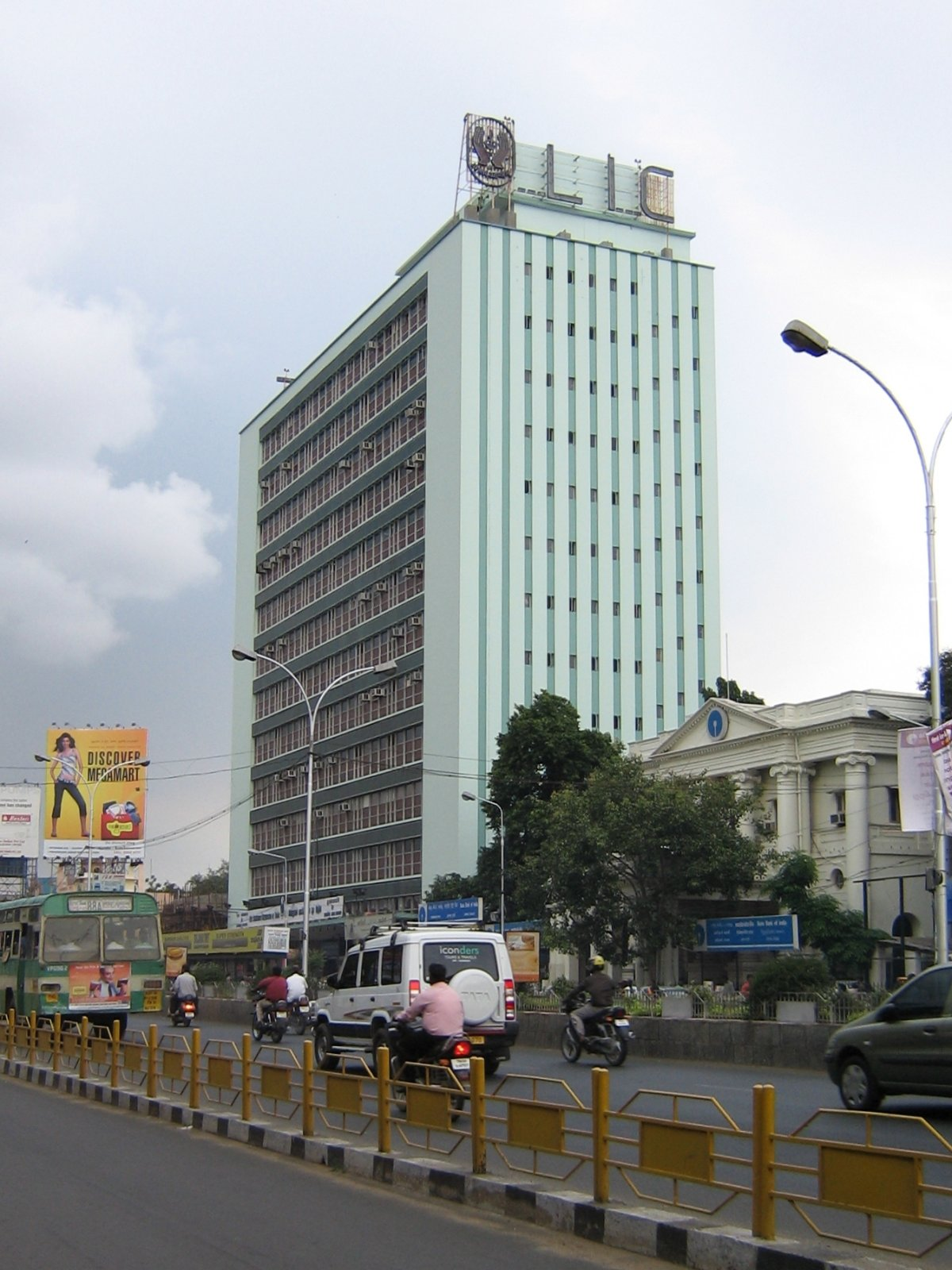
LIC Building, the first skyscraper of Chennai

After Independence, the city witnessed a rise in the Modernism style of architecture. The completion of the LIC Building in 1959, the tallest building in the country at that time, marked the transition from lime-and-brick construction to concrete columns in the region. The presence of the weather radar at the Chennai Port, however, prohibited the construction of buildings taller than 60 m around a radius of 10 km. The floor-area ratio (FAR) in the central business district was also 1.5 at that time, much less than that of smaller cities of the country. This resulted in the city expanding horizontally, unlike other metropolitan cities where vertical growth is prominent. On the contrary, the peripheral regions, especially on the southern and south-western sides, are experiencing vertical growth with the construction of buildings up to 50 floors. Within the downtown area, the 48-storied Highliving District Tower H remains the tallest building at 161 meters.

== Notable buildings ==
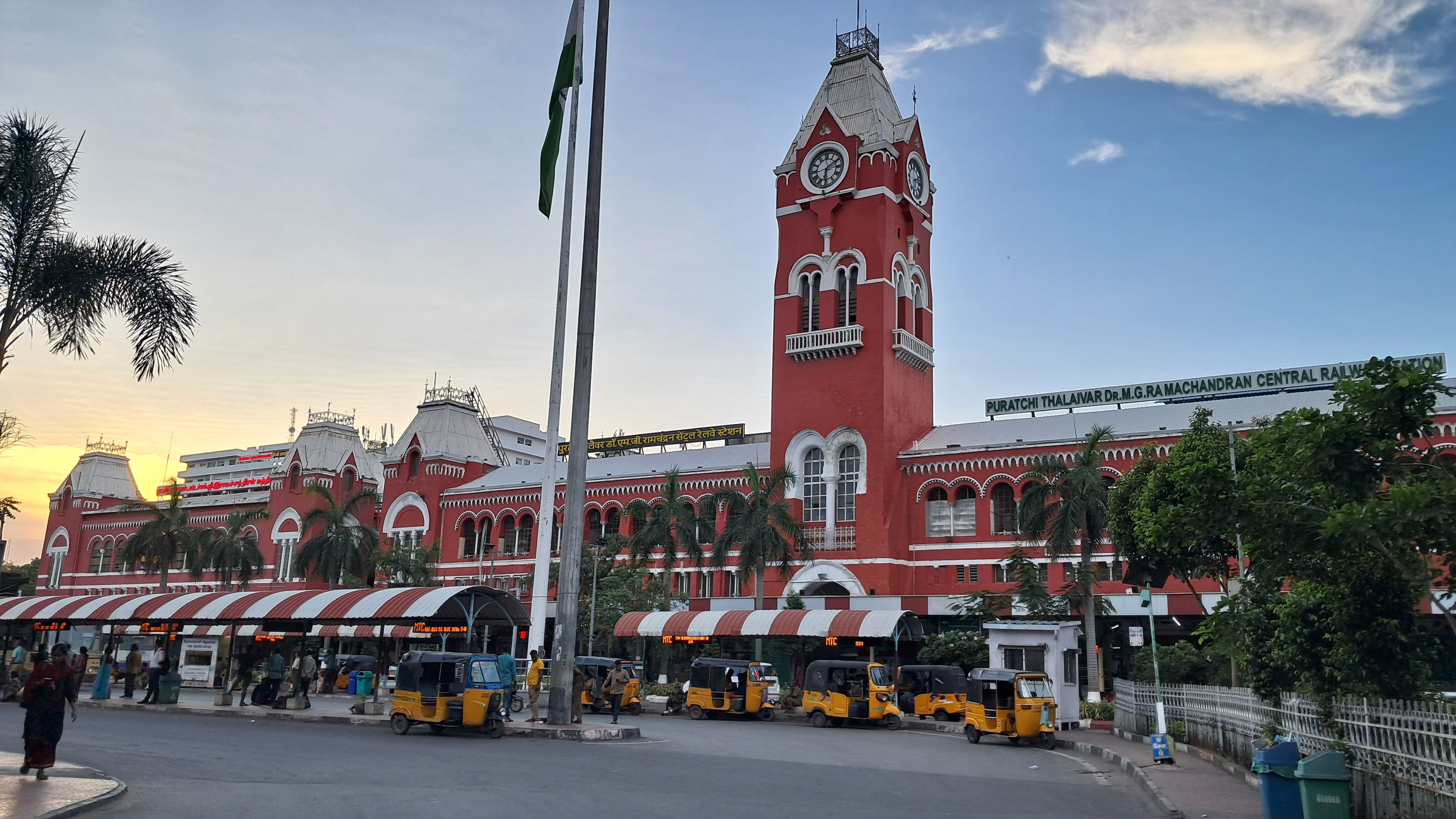
M.G.R. Chennai Central Station

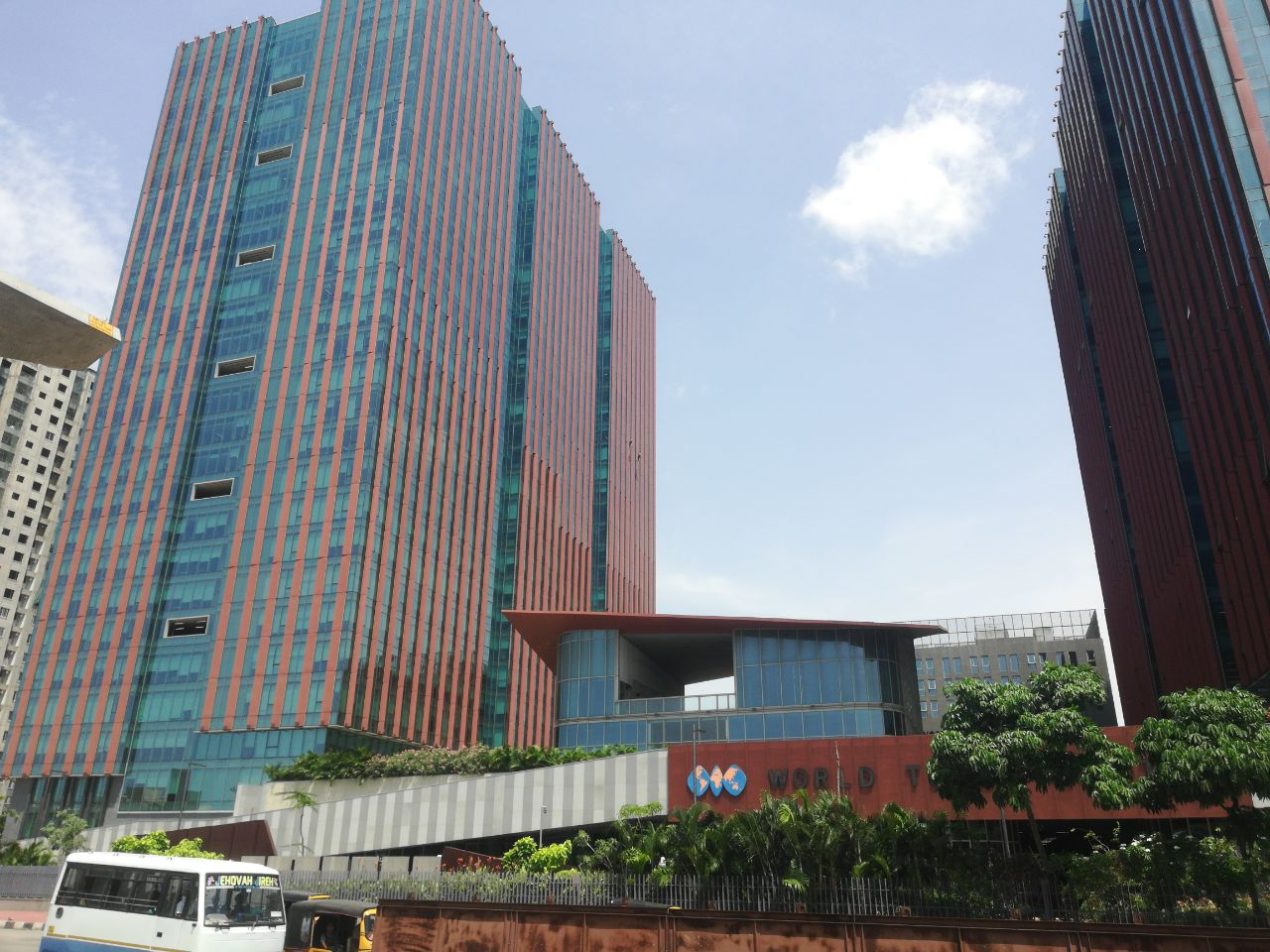
World Trade Center buildings

Many historic buildings are still fully functional and host government, business or educational establishments. Chennai is home to the second largest collection of heritage buildings in the country, after Kolkata.

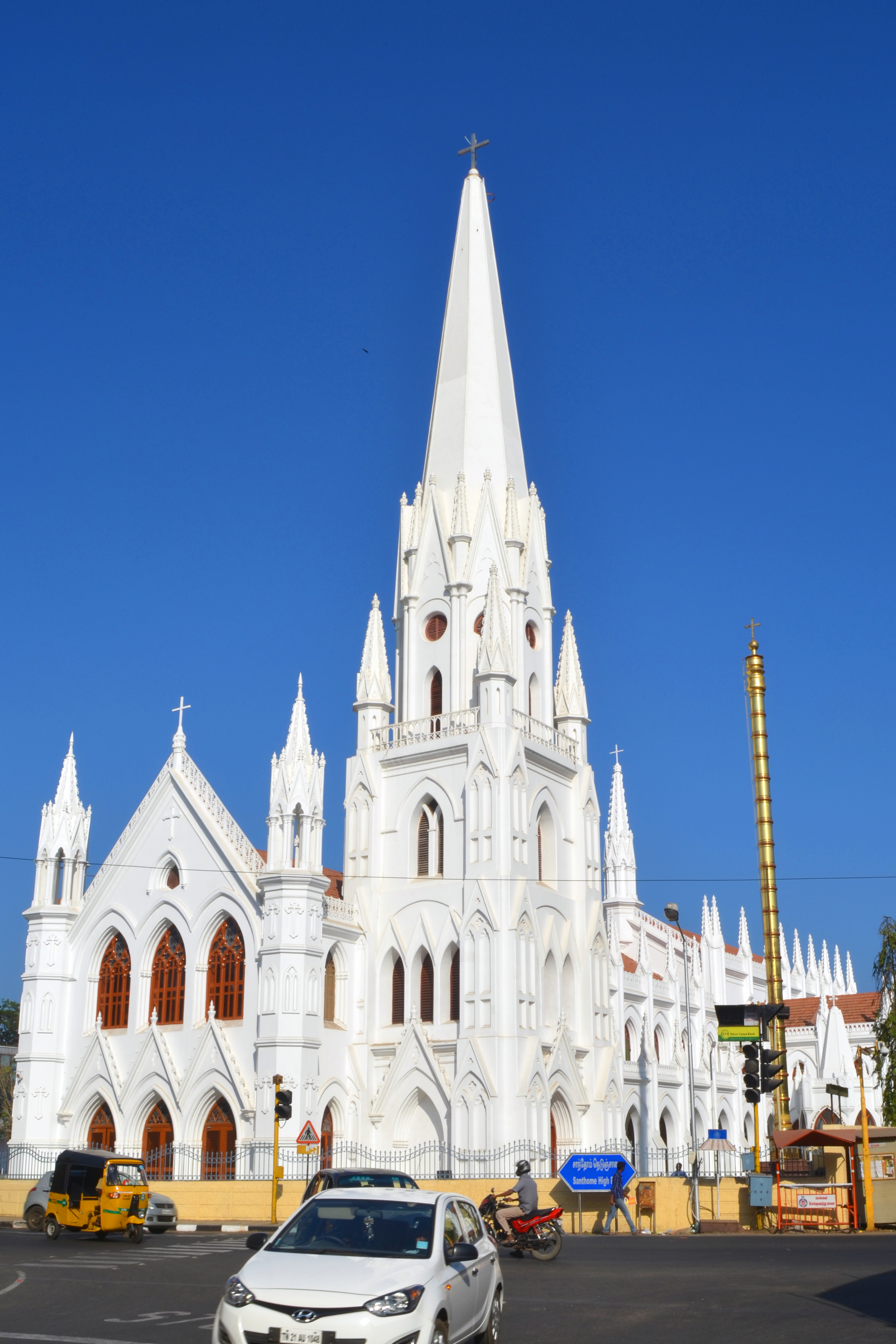
The Santhome Cathedral, built in 1523 by Portuguese and rebuilt in 1893 by British, is an example for Neo-Gothic architecture in the city.

=== Santhome Church ===
Built in 1523 by Portuguese explorers over the tomb of Saint Thomas the Apostle and rebuild in 1896 by British in the style of Gothic revival architecture with big tower and a second tower mark's the tomb of Apostle. It is known as National Shrine of Saint Thomas Cathedral Basilica in Chennai.

=== Fort St. George ===
Built in 1639, Fort St George, used to house the Tamil Nadu Legislative Assembly and Secretariat. Tipu Sultan's cannons decorate the ramparts of the Fort's museum. The Fort has the country's tallest flagstaff at a height of 150 feet. The fort is one of the 163 notified areas (megalithic sites) in the state of Tamil Nadu.

=== Madras High Court ===
The Madras High Court is the second largest judicial building in the world next only to the Courts of London. It is a good example of the Indo-Saracenic style and was completed in 1892.

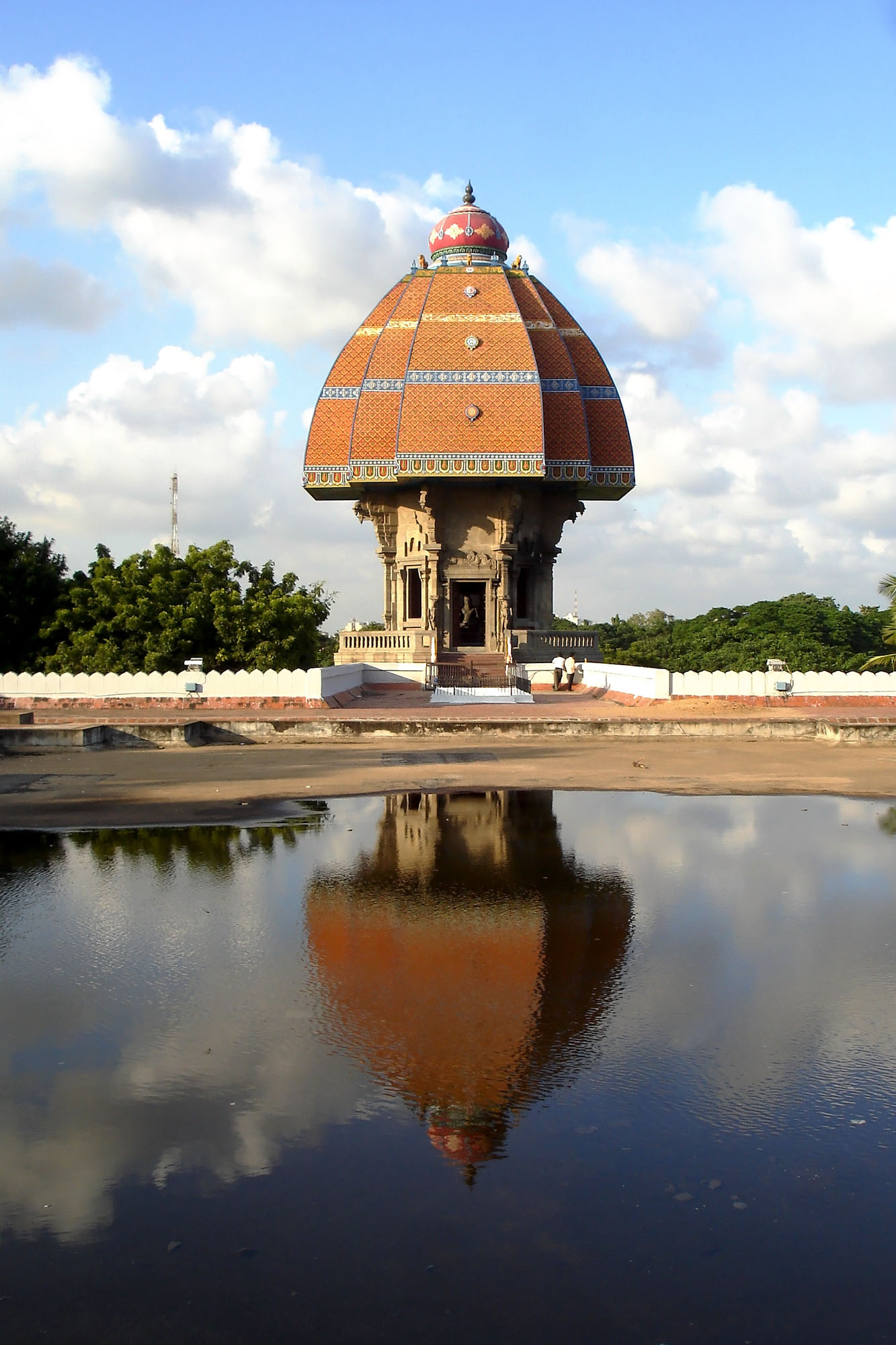
Valluvar Kottam from the terrace of the exhibition hall.

=== Valluvar Kottam ===
The Valluvar Kottam, constructed in 1976, is an auditorium in memory of the poet-saint Thiruvalluvar. All 1,330 verses of the poet's epic, the Thirukkural, are inscribed on the granite pillars that surround the auditorium. There is a 101-feet high temple chariot structure with a life-size image of the poet in it. The base of the chariot shows in bas-relief the 133 chapters of the Thirukkural.

=== Railway stations ===
There are a number of railway stations of interest in Chennai, primarily built throughout the colonial era. These include the Egmore station, the Royapuram station dating from 1856, the Chennai Central station dating from 1873 and the Southern Railway Headquarters built in 1922.

=== Other interesting buildings ===
The Government Museum (designed by Henry Irwin and completed in 1896), the Senate House of the Madras University and the College of Engineering, Guindy are some more examples of the Indo-Saracenic style of architecture.

Other buildings of architectural significance are the Presidency College, built in 1840, the Ripon Building (now housing the Chennai Corporation) dating from 1913, The War Memorial, Vivekanandar Illam, The Museum Theatre and the Ramakrishna Math temple. Adjoining the Governor's residence (Raj Bhavan) at Guindy, there are five mandapams (or memorials) dedicated to Mahatma Gandhi, the first Indian Governor General C Rajagopalachari, former Chief Ministers of the state Kamaraj and Bhaktavatsalam and one to Martyrs in general.

== Urban planning ==
Chennai city is arranged in a grid pattern running north–south and east–west. Roads and localities have undergone significant change in the late 20th century. Many areas along the western stretch of the city were planned development efforts, such as Ashok Nagar, KK Nagar and Anna Nagar. Several areas south of the Adyar River, including Kotturpuram, Besant Nagar and Adyar itself, have been developed only since the mid-1960s. Characteristic features of all these localities are their unusually wide roads and Cartesian grid layouts. Many of these places were remote suburbs when they were first developed.

Current urban development efforts are concentrated along the southern and western suburbs, largely seeking to benefit from the growing IT corridor in the southeast and the new ring roads in the west. The National Maritime Complex (NMC) is a proposed facility to be built in Chennai. The extent of the city's urban sprawl is indicated by the fact that the area administered by Chennai Corporation is 174 km^{2}, while the total urbanized area is estimated to be over 1,100 km^{2}.

== See also ==
- List of tallest buildings in Chennai
- Heritage structures in Chennai
