= Gove Building, Chennai =

Heritage building in Chennai, India

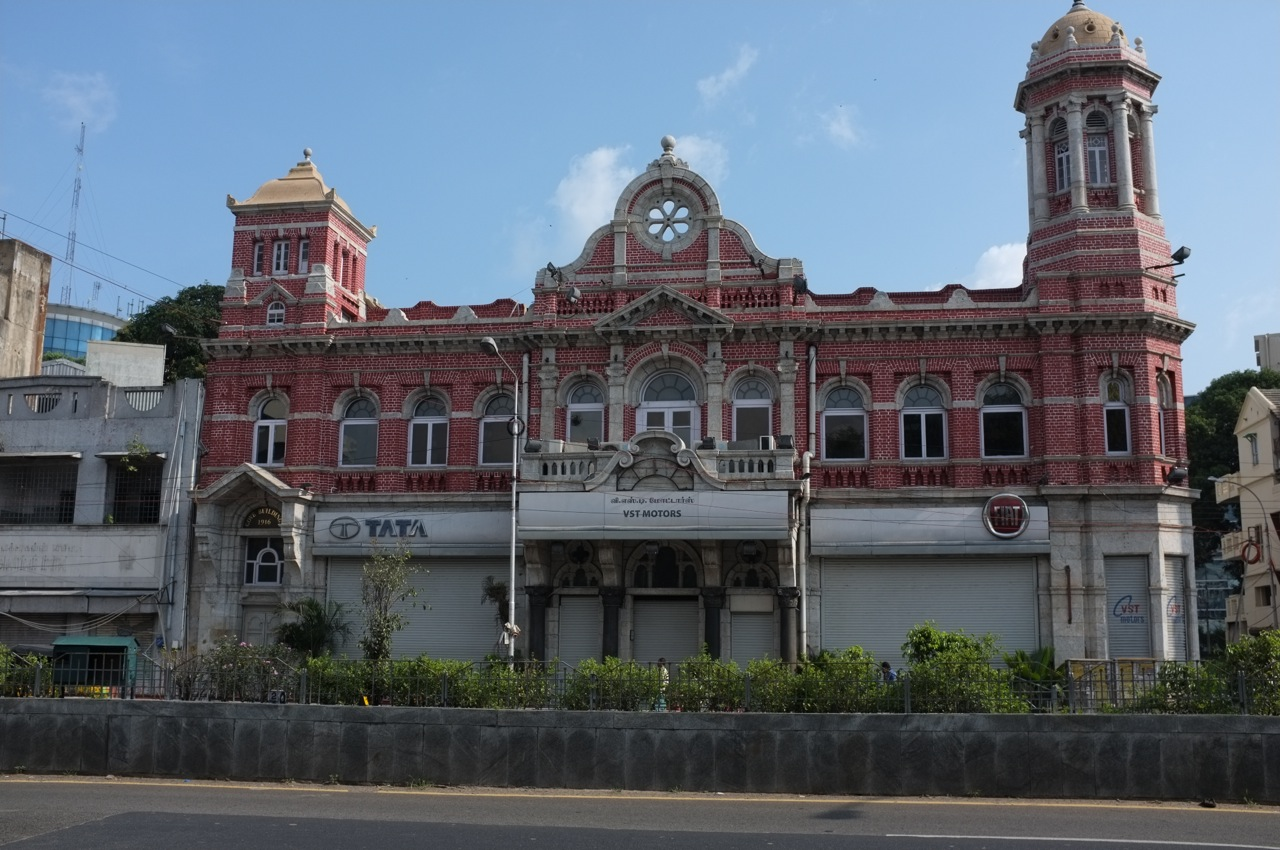
Gove Building

Gove building, formerly Cuddon building, is a heritage building in Chennai, India. Located on the arterial Anna Salai, the colonial building was built in 1916 in the Indo-Saracenic style.

== History ==
The building was originally built to be used as a car showroom for the city-based Simpson and Co owned by George Cuddon. With various models of luxury cars, including the Mercedes-Benz, on display, the building was considered the finest showroom in India. Named in 1943, the showroom still continues to function for the same purpose. In 1943, the building was renamed Gove Building, when it was bought by V. S. Thiruvengadaswamy Mudaliar of VST Motors. The building has been used by VST Motors ever since. Although minor modification were made to the building's interior by the company, the outer part remains untouched to retain its heritage value.

== The building ==
Gove Building is an ornate brick double-storied commercial structure. It features a wide frontage of about 90 feet, Italian marble flooring, and 18-foot-long plate-glass windows with sun-blinds imported from England.

As of 2020, the building has been used by VST Titanium Motors, a subsidiary company of VST Motors, running a Mercedes-Benz dealership in its 15,000 sq. ft. showroom.

== See also ==
- Architecture of Chennai
- Heritage structures in Chennai
