= Senate House (University of Madras) =

Administrative centre of the University of Madras, India

Coordinates: 13.065082°N 80.282909°E

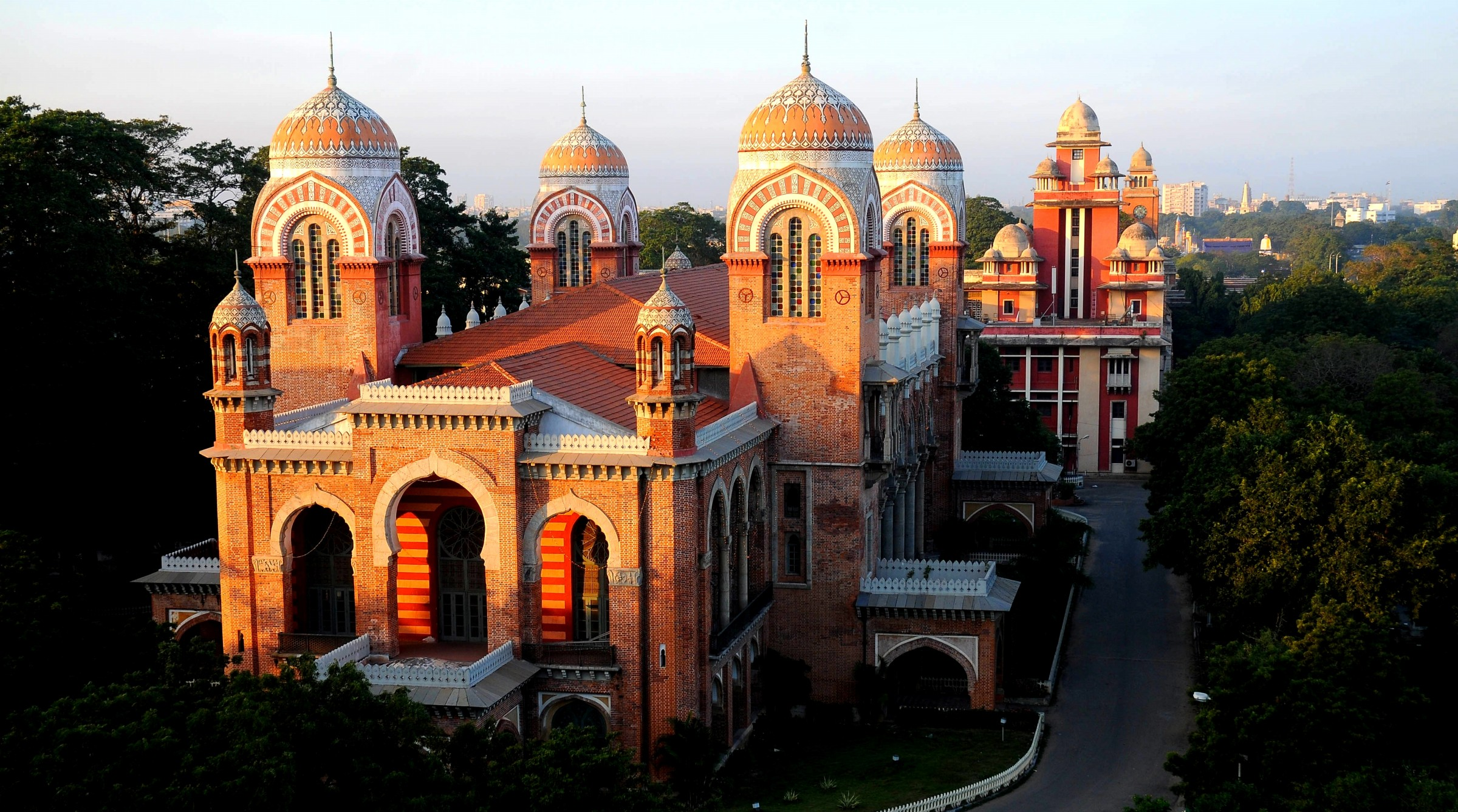
- Interactive map of the Senate House area

General information
- Location: Wallajah Road, Chennai, Tamil Nadu, India
- Groundbreaking: 1874
- Completed: 1879

Design and construction
- Architect: Robert Chisholm

The Senate House is the administrative centre of the University of Madras in Chennai, India. It is situated in Wallajah Road, along Marina Beach. Constructed by Robert Chisholm between 1874 and 1879, the Senate building is considered to be one of the best and oldest examples of Indo-Saracenic architecture in India.

== History ==
Robert Chisholm was a 19th-century British architect who is considered to be one of the pioneers of Indo-Saracenic architecture. Initially designing buildings using the Renaissance and Gothic styles of architecture, Chisholm switched over to Indo-Saracenic with the construction of the PWD buildings of the Chepauk Palace in 1871.

In 1864, the Madras government gave an advertisement inviting designs for the Senate House building. Chisholm's design was eventually approved and the building was constructed between April 1874 and 1879. A saluting battery was present at the site prior to the construction of the Senate House. Prior to the construction of the Senate House, university convocations were held at Banqueting Hall (now Rajaji Hall). The first annual conference of the Madras Music Season was held in the Senate House in the year 1929. During 14 July – 21 December 1937 the legislature of the Madras Presidency met at the Senate House.

== Architecture ==
The Senate built in the Indo-Saracenic style of architecture, incorporates many elements of the Byzantine style. The great hall of the Senate House is of immense height and proportions and considered to be the finest of its kind in India. The unique interior of the building includes, stained-glass windows, rare fresco paintings, intricate murals and painted panels.

== Renovation and events ==
The restoration of the Senate House was completed in 2006 to coincide with sesqui-centenary (150th year) celebration of the Madras University. Experts from INTACH and Archaeological Survey of India were consulted to restore the various features of this historic building. In September 2006, the Senate House was re-opened to the public by then president of India A. P. J. Abdul Kalam. Although, it remained largely unused for nearly a decade, until August 2015 when the prime minister of India Narendra Modi, inaugurated the India's first National Handloom Day at the Senate House building. Recently, it was the venue of a month-long exhibition of the second edition of Chennai Photo Biennale, a first-of-its kind photography conference in India during February–March 2019.

== Image gallery ==
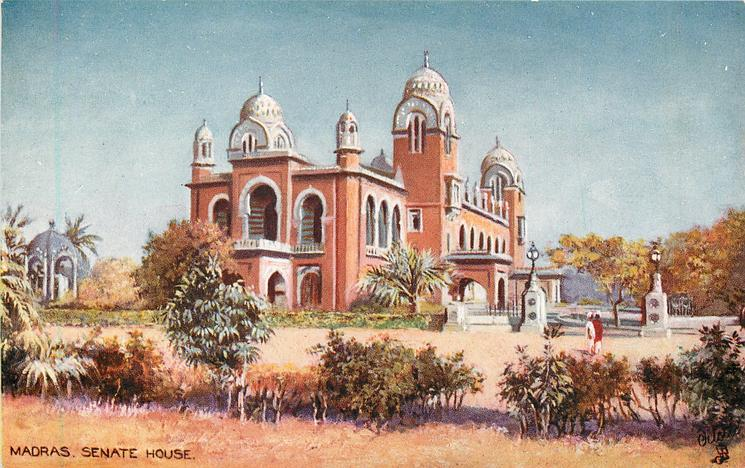
Senate House, Madras - Tucks Oileete (1911)

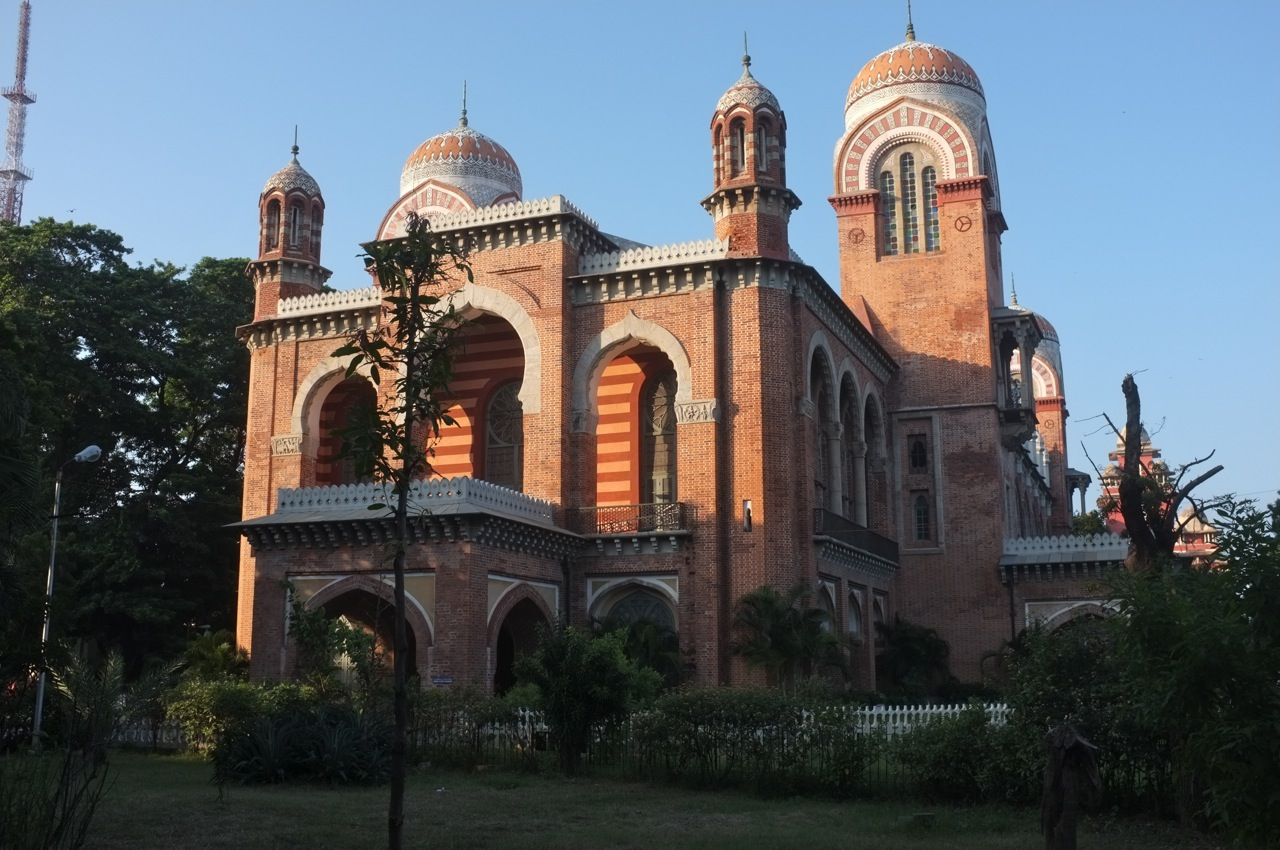
The Senate House

Stained-glass windows inside the Senate House

Interior view of the Senate House

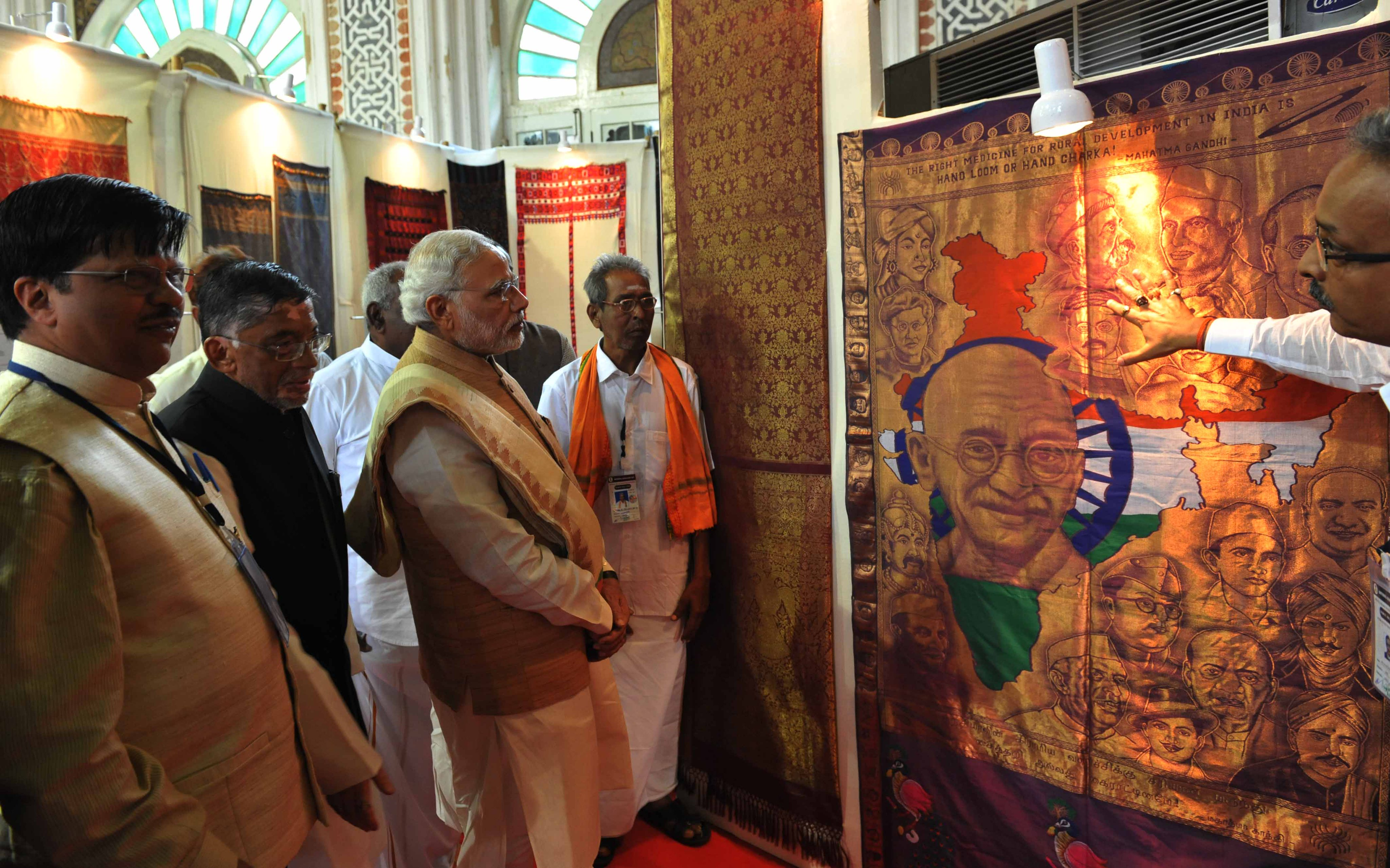
Narendra Modi at the inaugural National Handloom Day

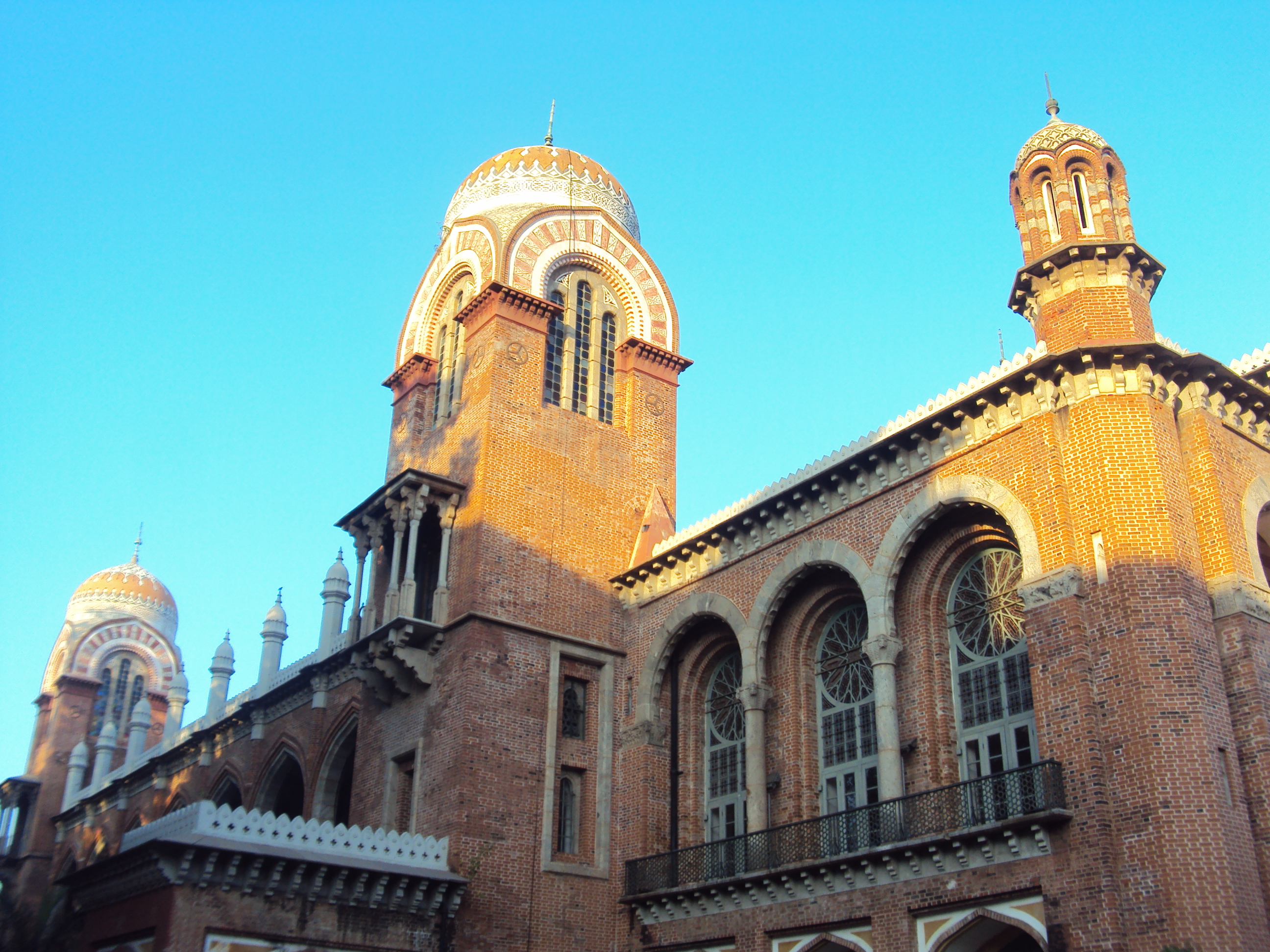
Front view of the Senate House

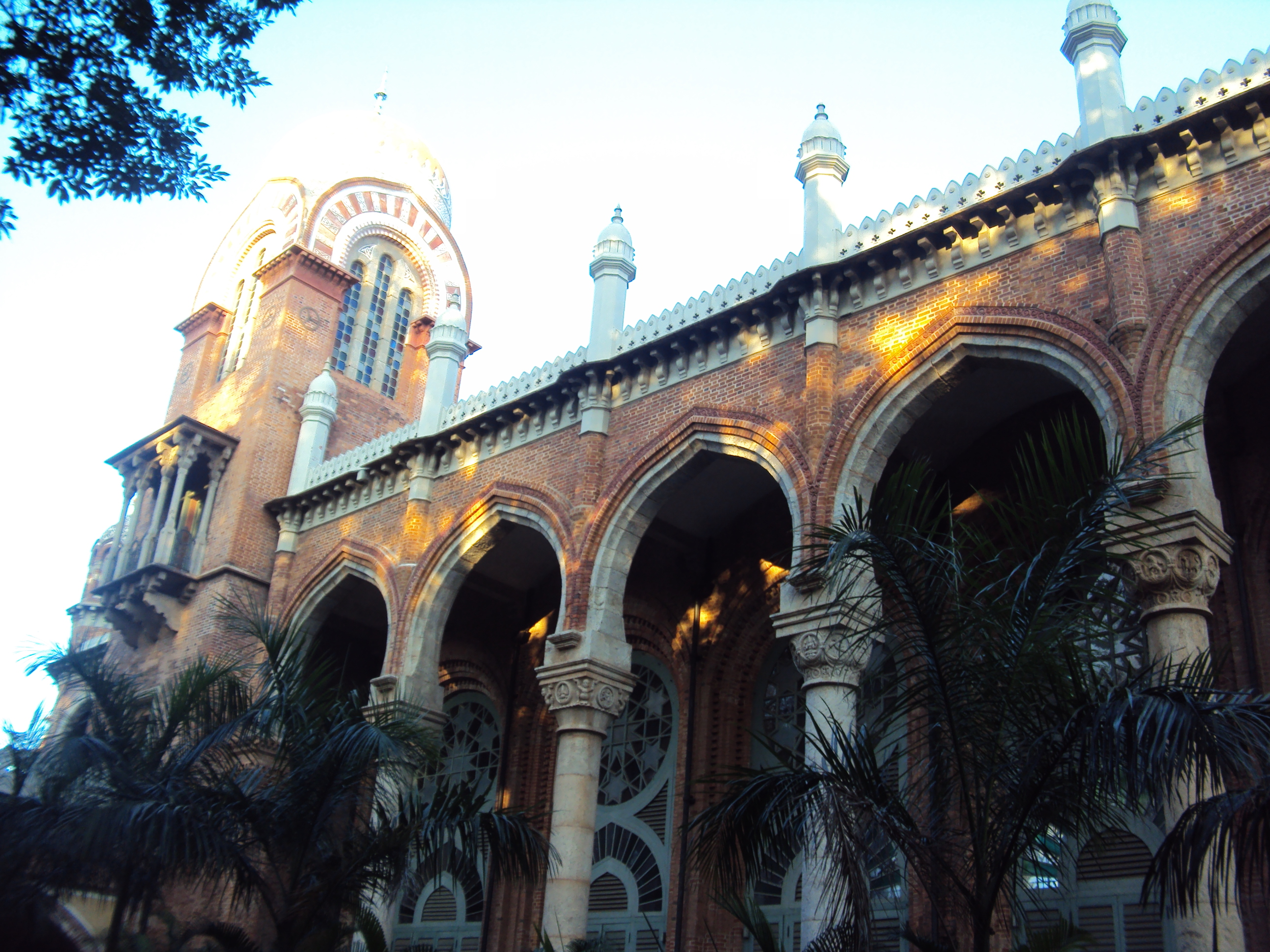
Decorative pillars of the Senate House

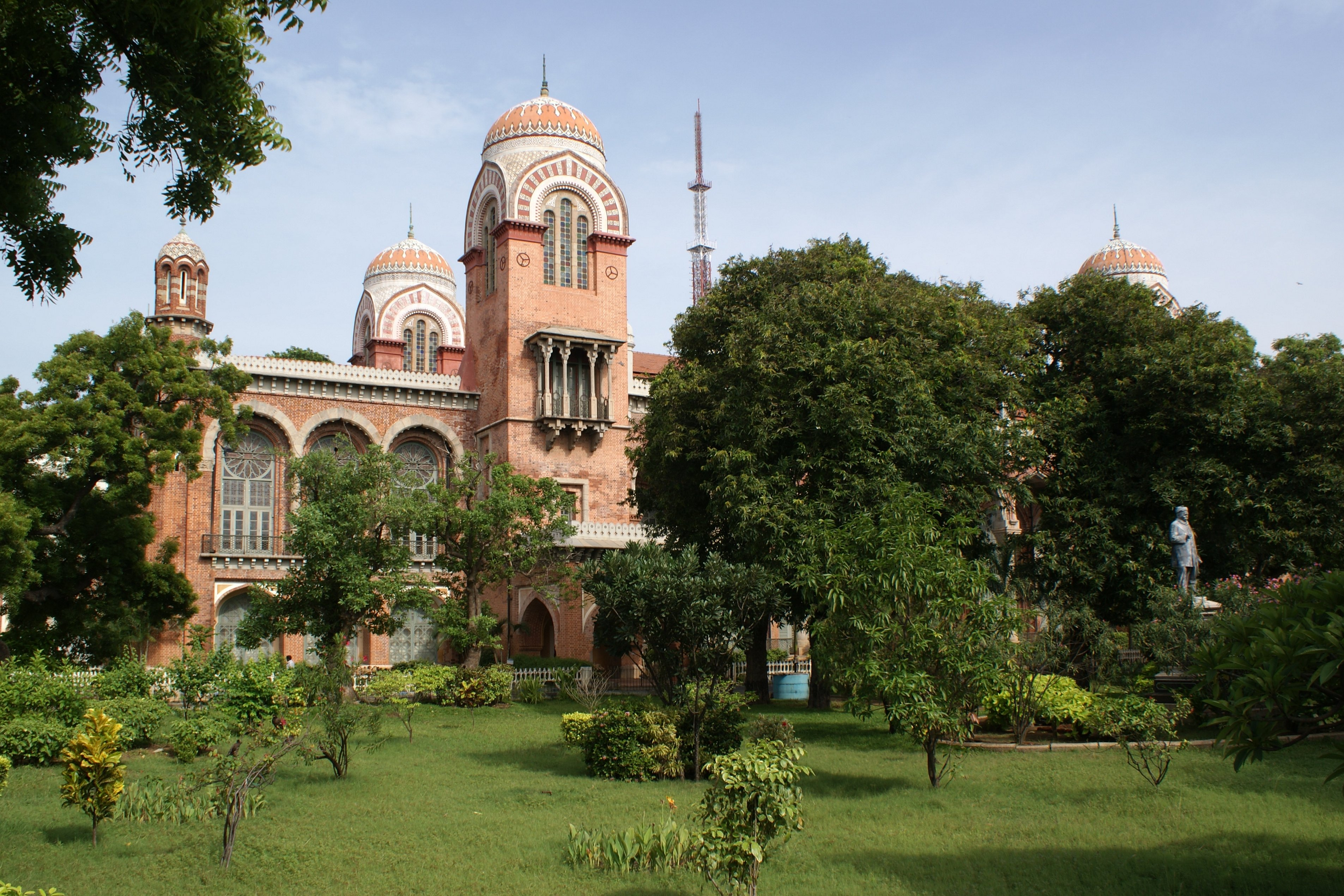
Garden outside the Senate House

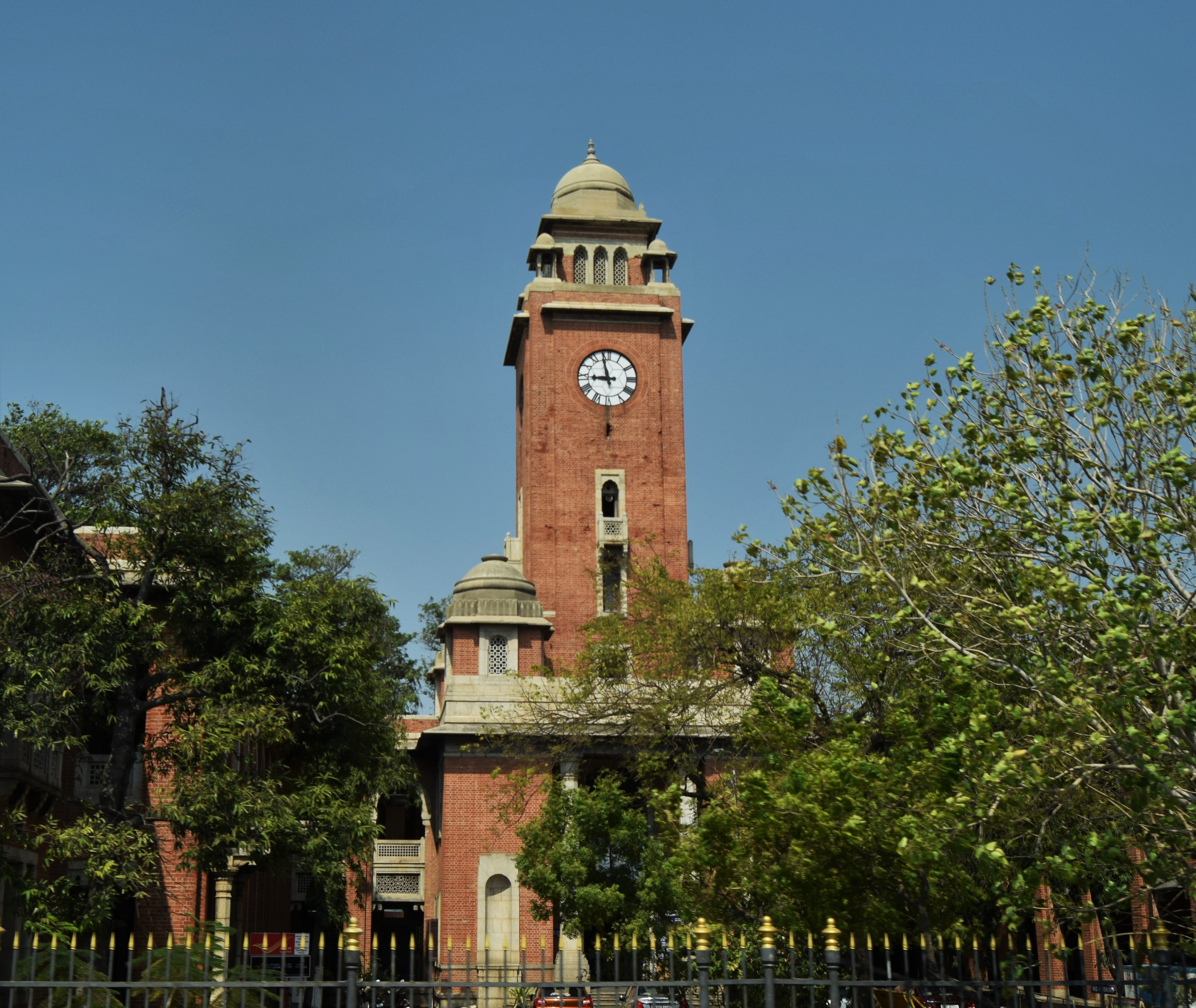
Clock Tower at the Chepauk Campus

== See also ==
- University of Madras
- Heritage structures in Chennai
