= Bharat Insurance Building =

Building in Chennai, India, built in 1897

Kardyl Building
- Kardyl Building in the early 20th century

- Location of Kardyl Building in Chennai
- 13.0651°N 80.2672°E

Kardyl Building is a heritage building in Chennai, India. Located on the arterial Anna Salai, it was built in 1897. Popularly known as The Bharat insurance building, the building is an example of the Indo-Saracenic architecture, a hybrid of Mughal and Gothic design with local materials.

The Madras High Court has stayed demolition of the building following a petition from heritage lovers.

== History ==
The building was made built with stained glass panels, domes, spires, arches, verandahs and 100-ft minarets in 1897 as a headquarters for pharmacist W.E Smith's firm, W.E Smith & Co. It was named The Kardyl building after the firm's telegraphic address "KARDYL". Once a lively commercial center, it started deteriorating due to poor maintenance. In the 1930s, the building shifted hands to the Bharat insurance company owned by Lala Harikrishen Lal, hence the later popularised name. The ownership changed several hands before it came under the possession of the Life Insurance Corporation of India (LIC) in 1956. In 1998, tenants were asked to vacate the premises due to the weakness of the structure, and LIC planned to demolish the building in 2006. The Madras High Court stayed it after the Indian National Trust for Architectural and Cultural Heritage (INTACH) filed a public interest litigation. INTACH received an interim order to preserve the building. LIC appealed to the Supreme Court which referred the matter back to the Madras High Court. The High Court issued a comprehensive order in 2009, asking the state government to submit a report on the building and also form a conservation committee to handle protection of other heritage structures. The heritage committee said in its report to the High Court that the building should be preserved, reiterating its heritage value. Meanwhile, LIC filed a petition with the Supreme Court in 2010, citing a technical report to argue that the building is structurally unsound and that it should be allowed to redevelop the property so it will resemble the old building in design. It also stated that the building has not been listed as a heritage structure anywhere and proposed an eight-storeyed complex in its place. The government made an announcement in October 2010 about finalising a heritage bill.

The Madras High Court in a landmark judgement in 2010 included the building in a set of 400-plus heritage structures that could not be demolished. The grade 'A' certification was also confirmed.

In May 2025, restoration work on the Kardyl building commenced headed by a restorative firm called Savani heritage conservation, headed by the Life insurance corporation of India, who presently own the premises, it was estimated to be a twenty month project to finish.

== See also ==
- Architecture of Chennai
- Heritage structures in Chennai
