= Southern Railway Headquarters, Chennai =

Office building in Chennai, India

Southern Railway Headquarters
- M&SM Headquarters Building
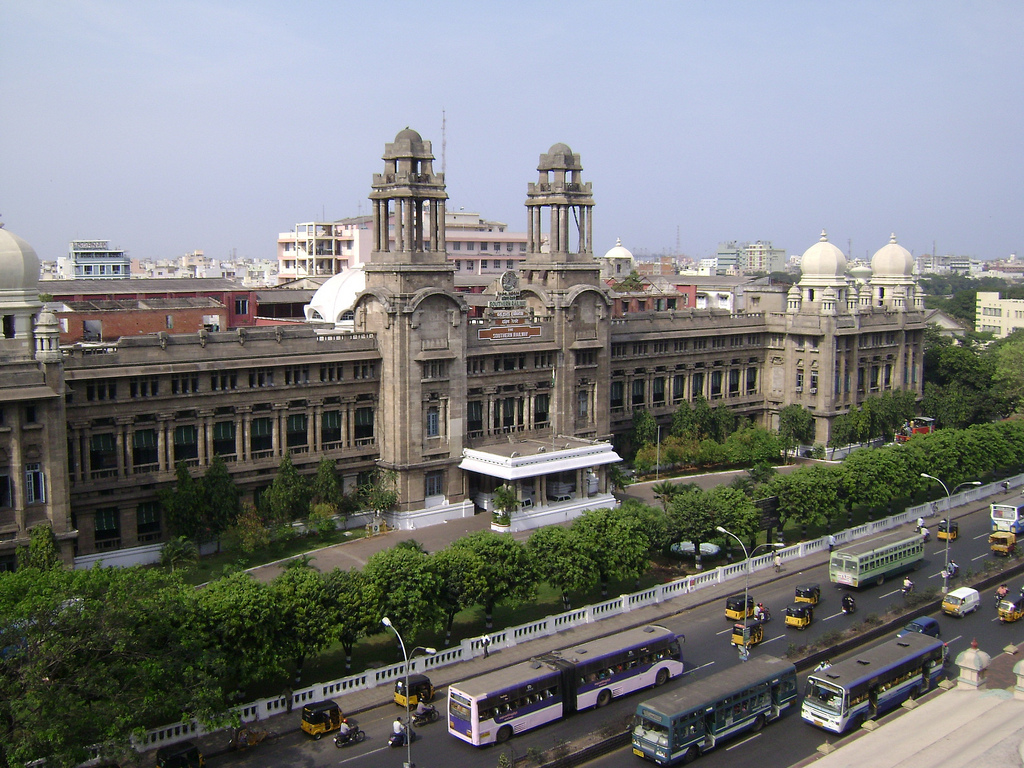
- Southern Railway headquarters, Chennai
- Interactive map of the Southern Railway Headquarters area

General information
- Architectural style: Indo-Saracenic
- Location: Poonamallee High Road, Chennai, India, Park Town, Chennai, Tamil Nadu 600 003
- Coordinates: 13.082574°N 80.277081°E
- Completed: 1921
- Inaugurated: 11 December 1922
- Owner: Southern Railways

Design and construction
- Architect: N. Grayson
- Main contractor: H. H. Wadia and Bros

Southern Railway headquarters administrative building, Chennai, is an Indo-Saracenic structure located adjacent to the Chennai Central on Poonamallee High Road.

== History ==
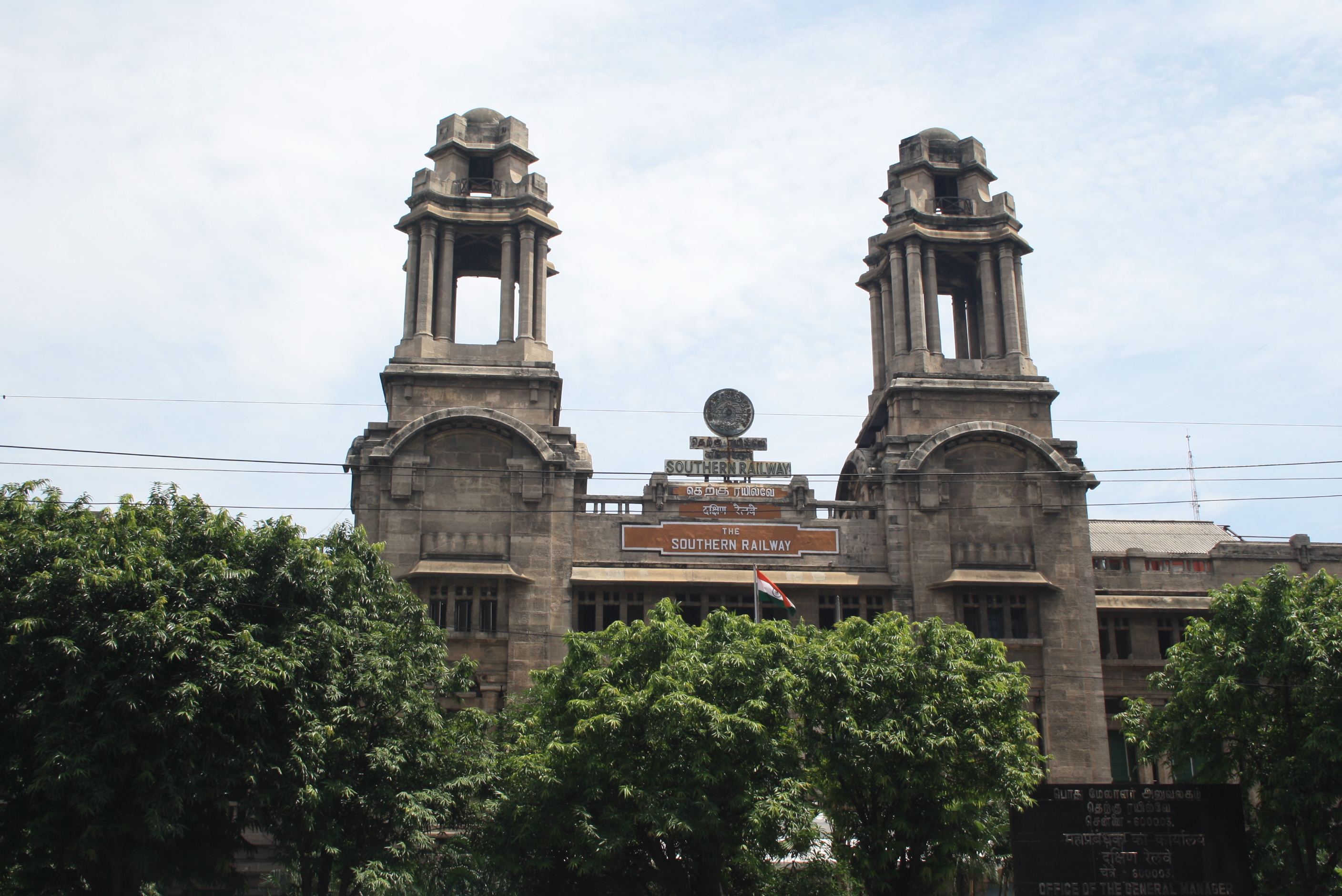
The facade towers of the building

Built in 1921 as the new Madras and Southern Mahratta Railway Company (MSMR) headquarters (successor of Madras Railway Company), replacing the general office of MSMR at Royapuram Railway Station, the building now functions as the headquarters of the Southern Railways. The building was built at a cost of ₹ 3 million by H. H. Wadia and Bros, a leading Porbandar-based contractor. Built for the first time in India in reinforced concrete in classical and Dravidian styles, the building was designed by N. Grayson, a 'company architect', working for the Madras & Southern Mahratta Railway. It took nine years and over ₹ 3 million to complete the building and was inaugurated on 11 December 1922.

== The building ==
The central bay has two rectangular wings, both of which are arranged around a lush courtyard. The structure was built with large windows to allow the sea breeze to waft through, reaching the courtyard from the front and then going out through the opposite wing.

== See also ==
- Heritage structures in Chennai
- Architecture of Chennai
