= National Maritime Complex =

The National Maritime Complex (NMC) is a proposed facility to be built in Chennai, India.

== Constituents ==
- National Maritime Museum & Maritime Art Gallery
- Marine Aquarium
- Maritime Commercial Complex
- Maritime Sector Offices
- Marine Food Court and Catering College
- Maritime Convention Centre with a Five Star Hotel
- Golf Course and Water Sports
