= Chepauk =

Neighbourhood in Chennai, Tamil Nadu, India

- Neighbourhood
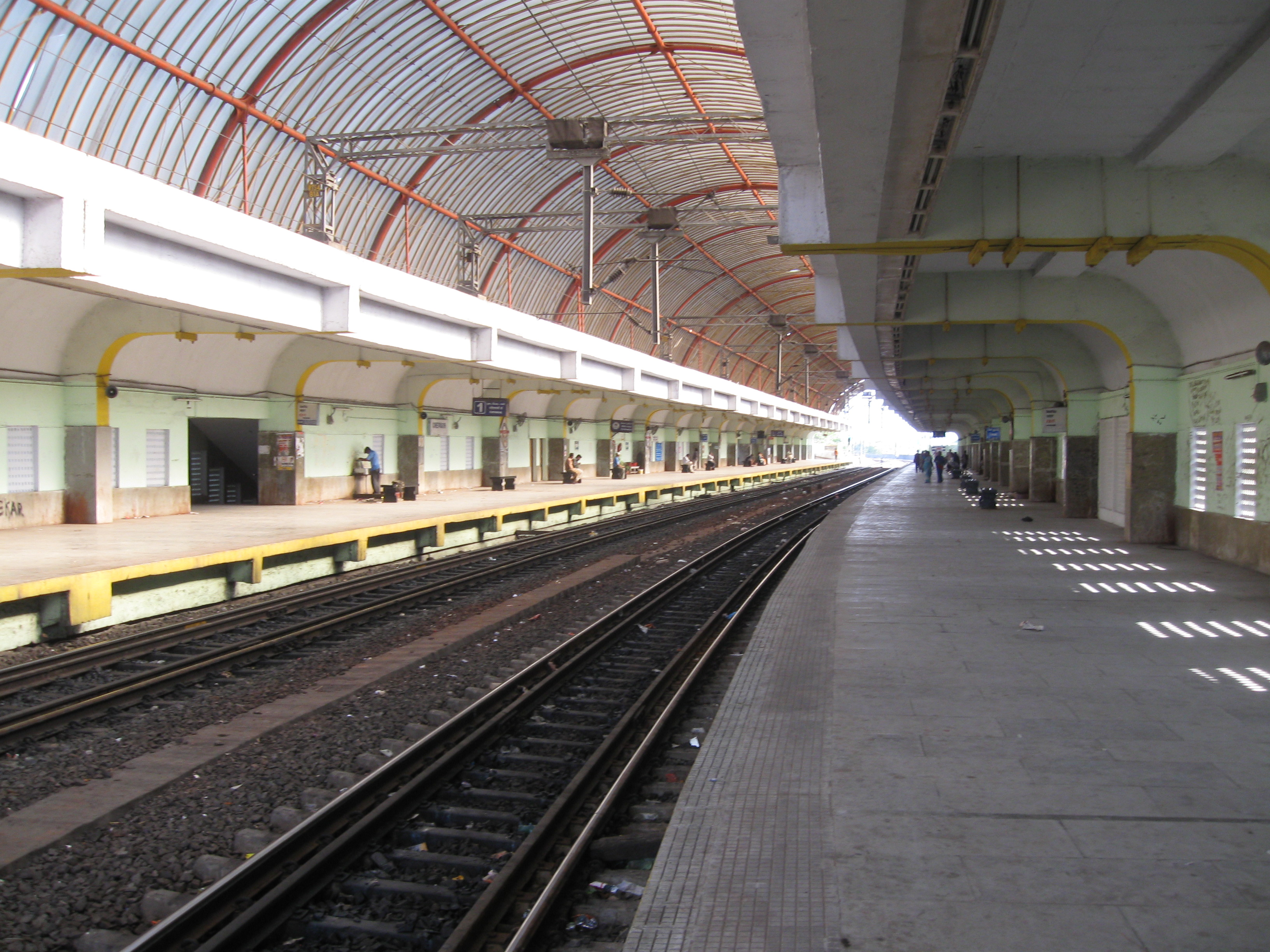
- Chepauk MRTS station

- Location within Chennai Location within Tamil Nadu Location within India
- Coordinates: 13.0637°N 80.2817°E
- Country: India
- State: Tamil Nadu
- District: Chennai District
- Metro: Chennai

Government
  - Body: Greater Chennai Corporation
- Elevation: 56 m (184 ft)

Languages
  - Official: Tamil
- Time zone: UTC+5:30 (IST)
- PIN: 600005
- Planning agency: CMDA
- Civic agency: Chennai Corporation
- Website: www.chennai.tn.nic.in

Chepauk is a locality in Chennai, India. The name Chepauk is popularly used to refer to the M. A. Chidambaram International Cricket Stadium, also known as the Chepauk Stadium. It is also home to the Chepauk Palace, built in the Indo-Saracenic style. The University of Madras campus is yet another prominent landmark of Chepauk. The Central Research laboratory is located here. Chepauk's postal index number (PIN) code is 600005. The main roads of Chepauk are Bells Road and Walajah Road.

The University of Madras has its main campus located here.

The Tamil Nadu legislative assembly-secretariat complex was built up at Omandurar Government Estate, also situated on the periphery of Chepauk, which was later converted into a vast multi-speciality government hospital. The Chennai MRTS railway passes through Chepauk and the Chepauk MRTS station is located adjacent to the M. A. Chidambaram Stadium.

== Etymology ==
The English name "Chepauk" is said to be derived from the Hindustani word "Che Baagh", meaning "six gardens".

== Politics ==
It is a part of Chepauk-Triplicane assembly constituency which in turn a part of Chennai Central (Lok Sabha constituency).

== Public transport ==
Chepauk is one of the stations on the MRTS elevated rail corridor in Chennai

MTC Buses Passing exactly through chepauk:

Through Bells Road, Stadium and Walajah Road: 22A, 6A, 22, 27B, 127B, 27L, 27H, 40, 40A, M28

Walajah Road and Annasquare: 11H

Beach Road (Chepauk and Annasquare): 13 series, 45B,45E, PP19, PP21, 21G, G21, H51, PP51, 21H, H21, 6D, 6E, 12G, 25G, 21K, M21K, 21L, etc.

A metro rail station, Government Estate, in the underground line of the CMRL is also present near the Government Multi-Speciality Hospital.
