= Robert Chisholm (architect) =

English architect active mainly in India

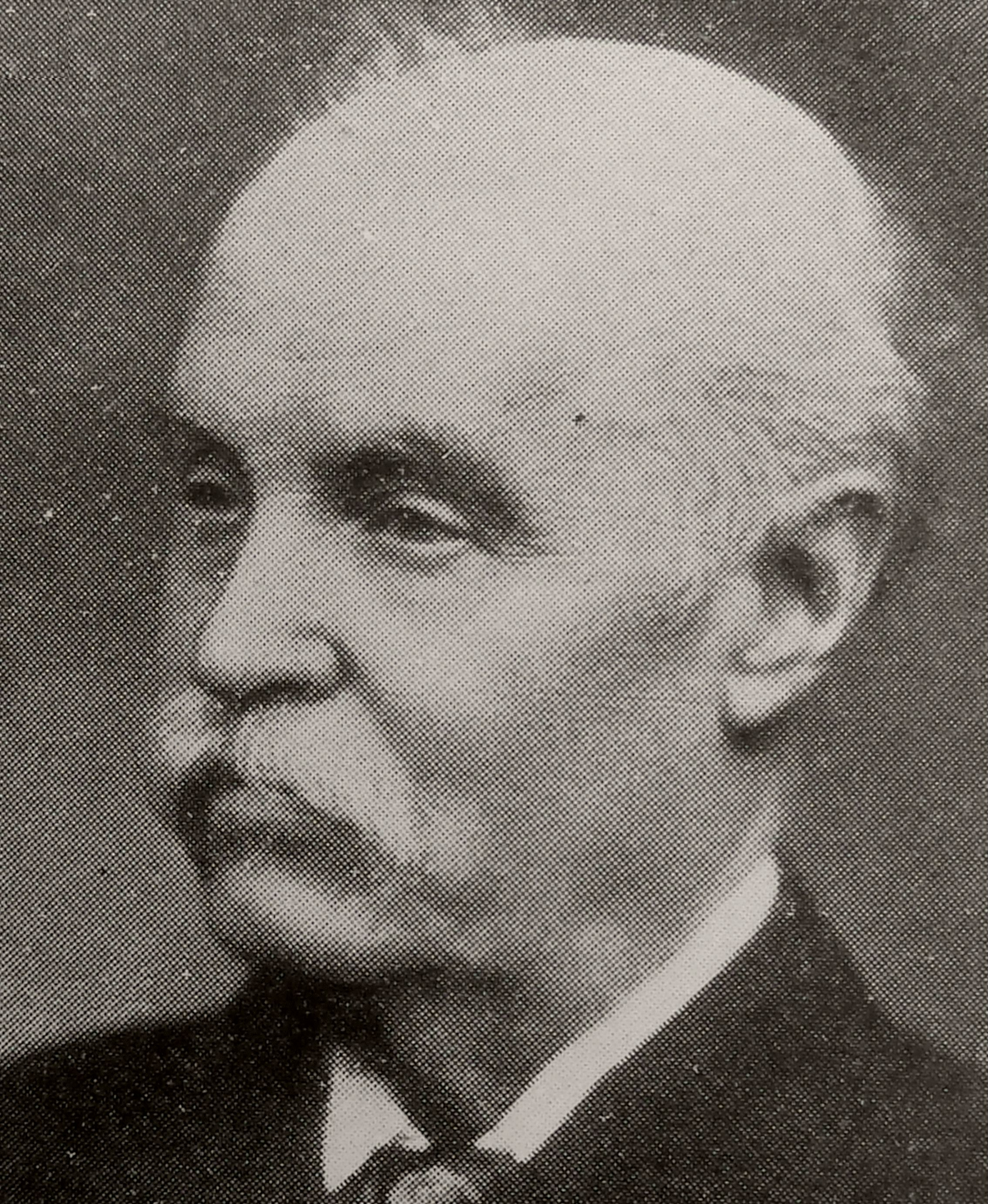
- Born: Robert Fellowes Chisholm; 11 January 1840; London, England
- Died: 28 May 1915 (aged 75); Southsea, England
- Occupation: Architect
- Buildings: Senate House, Madras; Laxmi Vilas Palace; Cadogan Hall
- Design: Pioneer of Indo-Saracenic style

Robert Fellowes Chisholm (11 January 1840 – 28 May 1915) was a British architect who pioneered the Indo-Saracenic style of architecture in Madras.

== Early life ==
Chisholm was born in London on 11 January 1840 (or on 3 November 1838, according to the Royal Institute of British Architects), and had his early education in the United Kingdom, practising as a talented landscape painter in London during his youth. On completion of his education, he arrived at Calcutta, India and moved to Madras in 1865, where he was appointed head of the school of industrial art.

He was an active freemason, and Worshipful Master of the Lodge Perfect Unanimity, in its Centenary Year (1886).

== Career ==
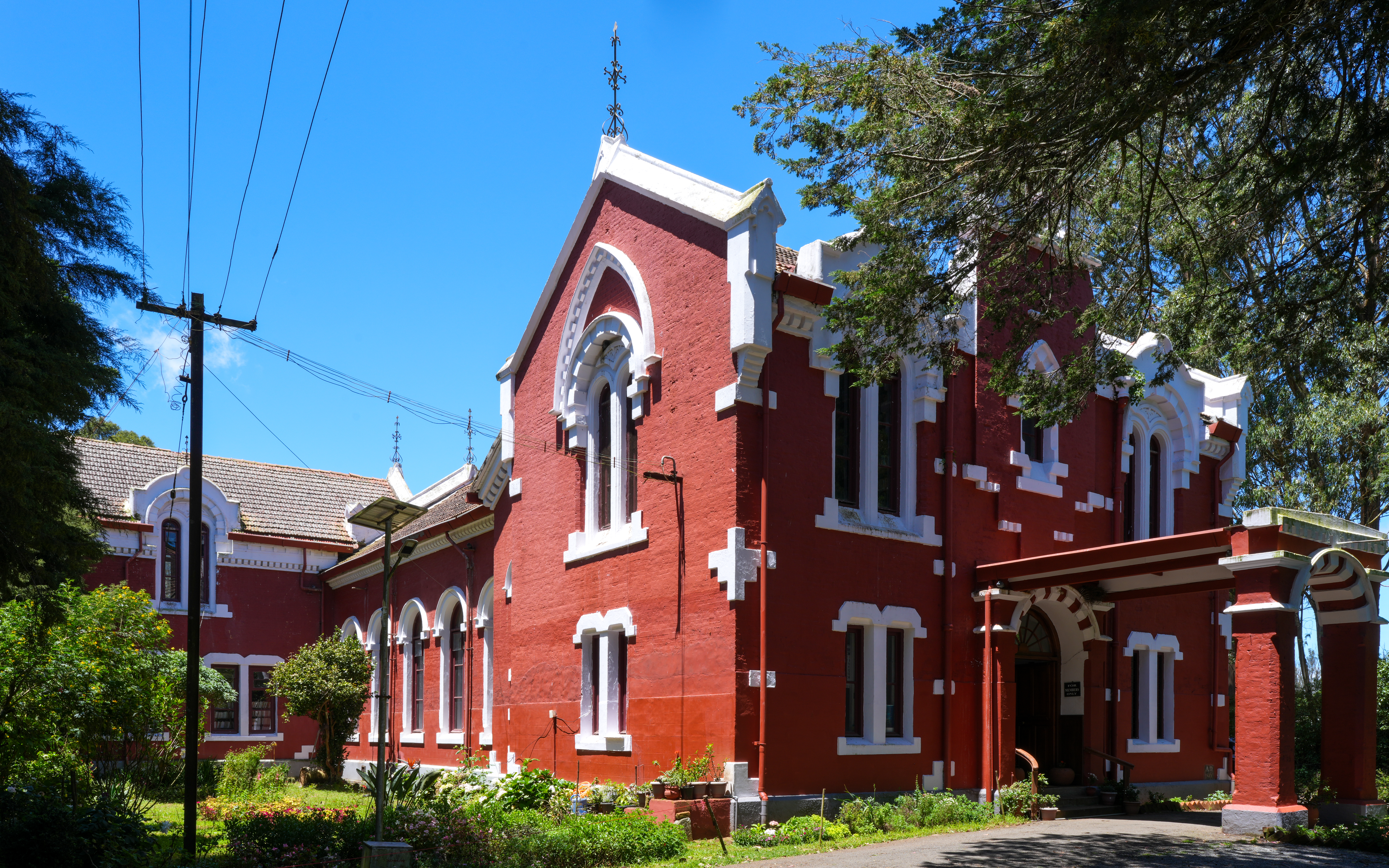
Nilgiri Library, Ootacamund, designed by Chisholm in 1865-67

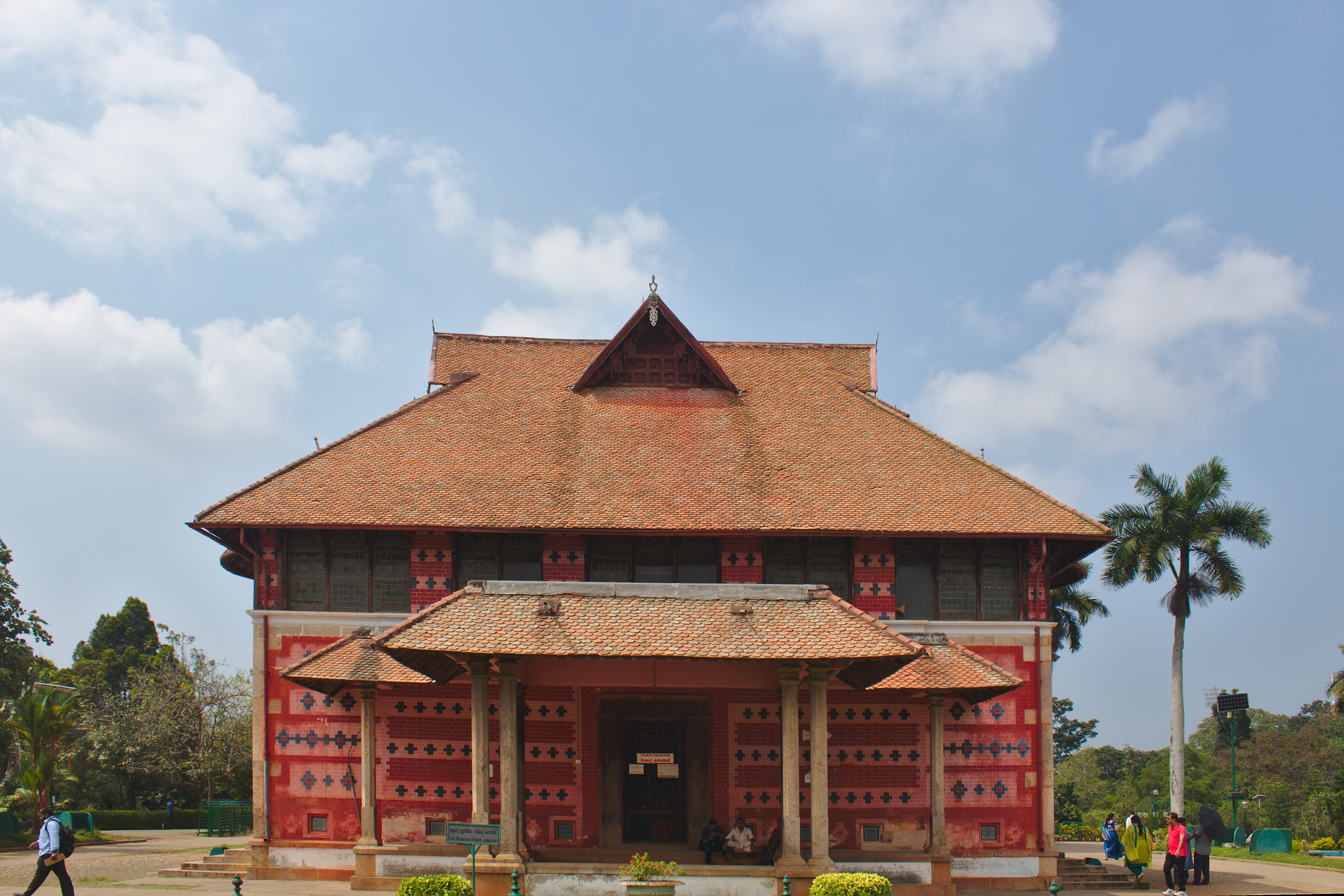
Napier Museum, designed by Chisholm

In that same year, 1865, Chisholm began to design the older building of Presidency College, Madras. He initially constructed buildings in the Renaissance and Gothic styles of architecture. Also in 1865–67, he was designing the Nilgiri Library in Ootacamund (completed in 1869), and the Lawrence Memorial School in that same town (1865–69). The revenue board building in the Chepauk Palace complex, which was constructed by Chisholm in 1871, was his first in the Indo-Saracenic or Muslim style of architecture. Chisholm later emerged as a pioneer in the Indo-Saracenic style of architecture.

Chisholm also constructed the Lawrence Asylum buildings (1865), Napier Museum Trivandrum, Presidency College, Madras (1865–70) the Senate buildings of the University of Madras (1874–79), offices of the P. Orr & Sons and the Post and Telegraph Office in Ootacamund (1875–83). Chisholm also enlarged and constructed a pavilion at the M. A. Chidambaram Stadium. Chisholm was appointed Consulting Architect to the Government of Madras in 1872 and served from 1872 to 1886. In 1876 he was appointed to the newly established executive committee of management of the Madras School of Arts, and was Officiating Superintendent of that institution from 1877 to 1883. He was also responsible for the Bombay Municipal Offices and the immense Laxmi Vilas Palace in Baroda (Vadodara) during 1880–90. He returned to London in 1902, where his best-known London building is Cadogan Hall (originally First Church of Christ, Scientist), near Sloane Square. He also designed an uncompleted Indian Museum in Belvedere Road, Lambeth, London.

== Death ==
Chisholm died on 28 May 1915 at Southsea at the age of 75.
