= Thiruvalluvar Temple, Mylapore =

Thiruvalluvar Temple
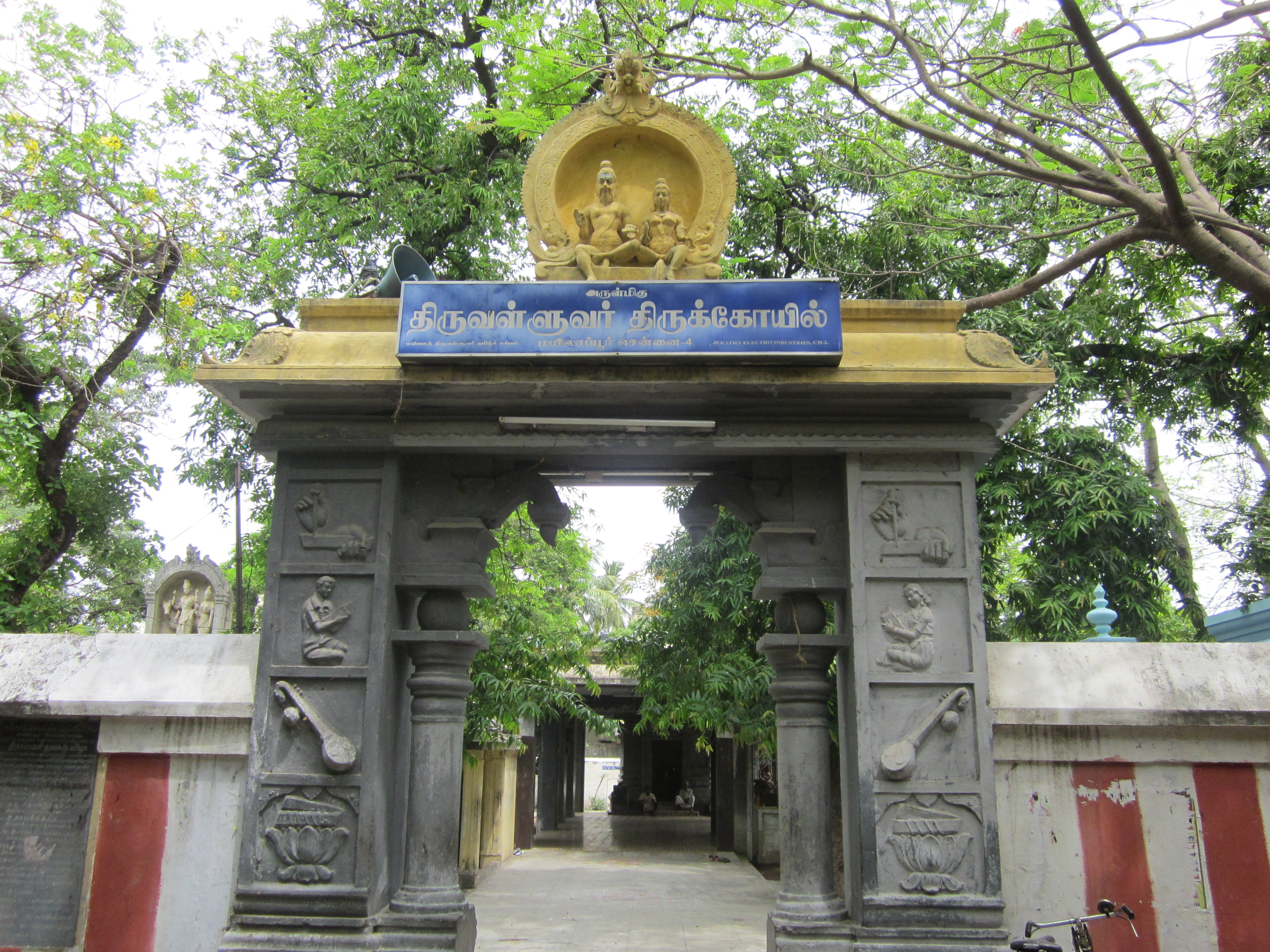
- Thiruvalluvar Temple in Mylapore

- Location within India

Religion
- Affiliation: Hinduism
- Deity: Valluvar and Vasuki

Location
- Location: M. K. Amman Street, Mylapore, Chennai, India
- Country: India
- Interactive map of Thiruvalluvar Temple
- Coordinates: 13.0398073°N 80.2710717°E

Architecture
- Completed: Early 16th century (present structure)

The Ekambareswarar–Kamakshi Temple, commonly known as the Thiruvalluvar Temple, is a Hindu temple dedicated to the poet-saint Valluvar in the neighborhood of Mylapore in Chennai, India. The shrine is located within the Ekambareswarar temple complex. Believed to have been constructed in the early 16th century, the temple was extensively renovated in the 1970s. Traditionally believed to be the birthplace of Saint Valluvar, the temple is the oldest ever built to Valluvar. The temple also serves as the venue for meetings of Tamil language enthusiasts and conducting Kural classes. While many consider the temple as the birthplace of Valluvar, some additionally consider it as his samadhi (place of cremation).

== Tradition and history ==
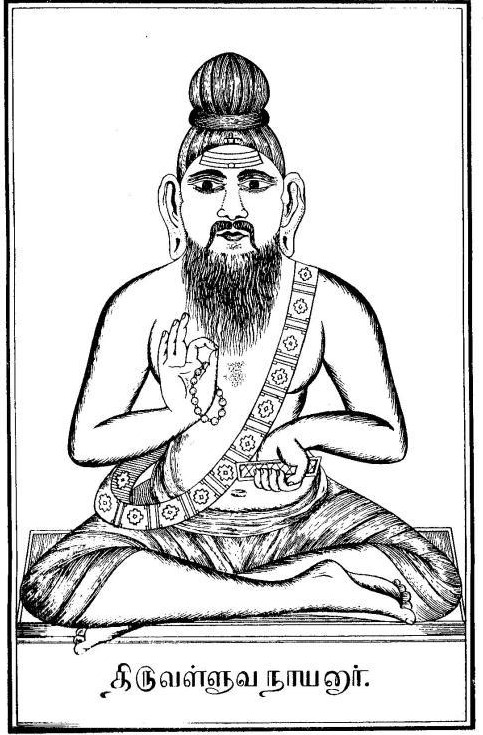
Traditional Shivite portrait of Valluvar

The temple was originally believed to be a village temple dedicated to Shiva during the times of Valluvar. Valluvar is traditionally believed to have been born under the iluppai or butter tree (Madhuca indica) within this temple complex, where he was found and taken for adoption by his foster parents. This claim is attributed to the poem Kapilar Akaval, which states that Valluvar was born on the top of an oil-nut or iluppai tree in Mayilapuram. Legend has it that close to the time of Valluvar's death, Elelasingan, a merchant at Mylapore and the disciple of Valluvar, expressed his desire to place Valluvar's body in a golden coffin and erect a monumental grave. Refusing his request, Valluvar asked him to tie his corpse with cords and leave it among the woods outside the town in order for the wild animals to feed on it. Elelasingan obliged to his mentor's wishes and, upon doing so, observed that the crows and other animals that fed on his corpse "became beautiful as gold." He then built a small temple at the site and instituted worship, where it remained for centuries. The present shrine was built on the ruins of the old shrine located in a grove within the existing Shiva temple complex in the early 16th century. The temple is the oldest known temple ever built to Saint Valluvar. The British civil servant of the Madras Presidency Francis Whyte Ellis mentions the temple in his early-19th-century stone inscription found in the Periyapalayathamman temple at Royapettah. The Ekambareshwarar temple is widely considered as the birthplace of Valluvar by the public and historians, although some additionally consider it as the place of his death and cremation. Valluvar is believed to have been born on Vaikasi Anusha (Anusha star in the Tamil month of Vaikasi) and attained moksha on Maasi Utthra (Utthra star in the Tamil month of Maasi).

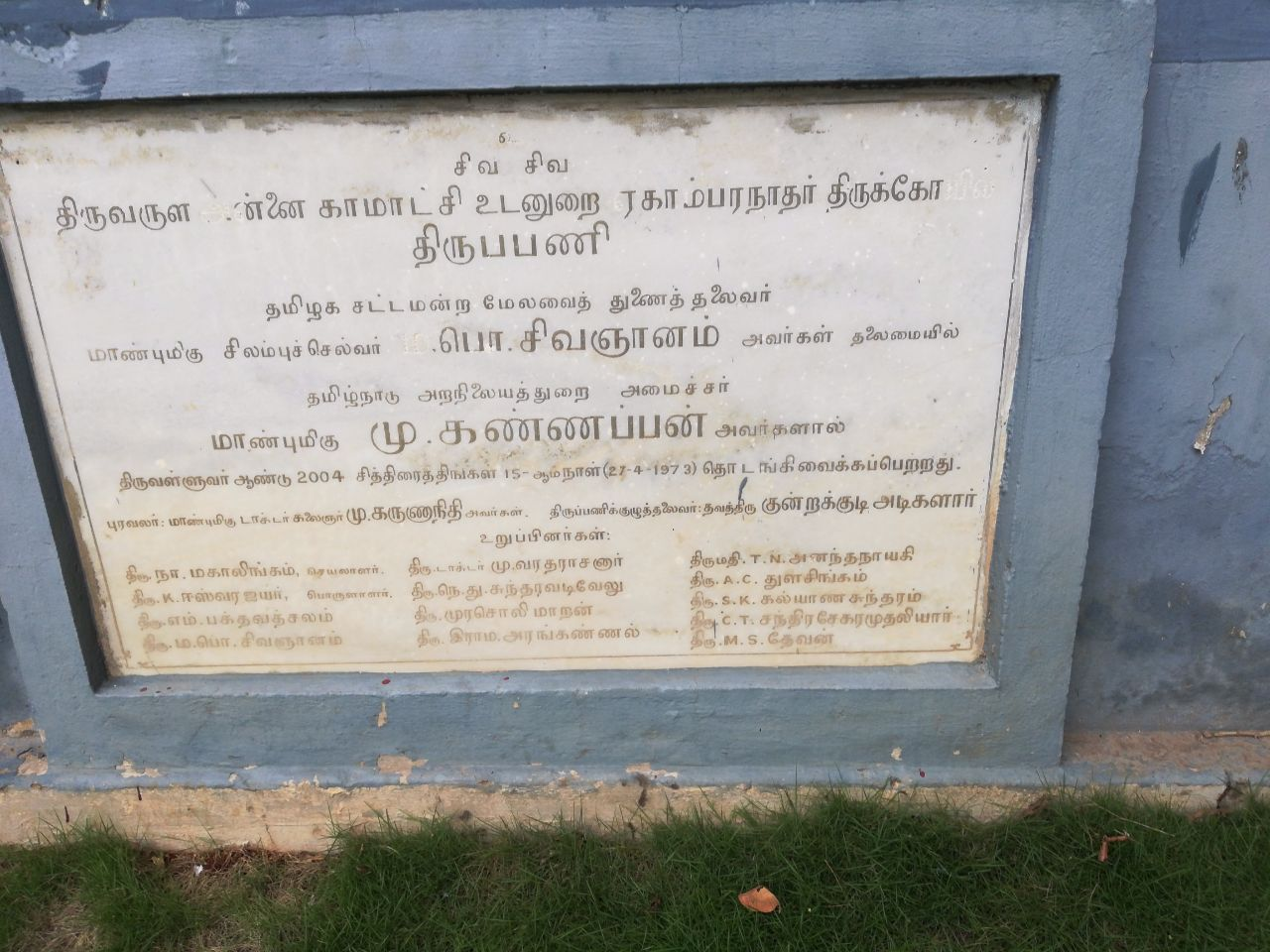
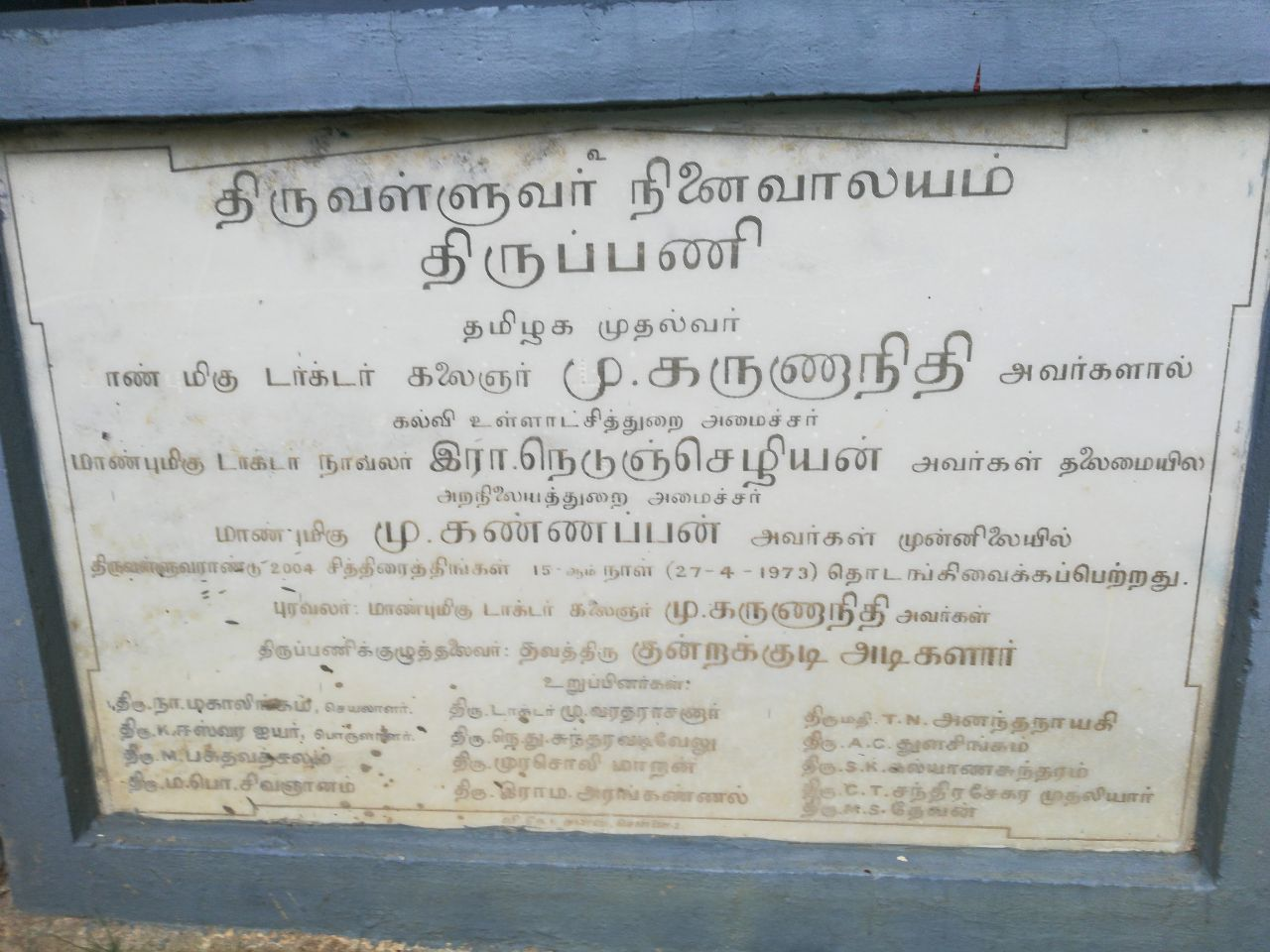
Temple renovation plaques

In his 1989 book entitled Thirumayilayin Thirukoilgal, S. Rajendran indicates that the temple was built in the early part of the 16th century. The book also mentions that the temple's history is documented much earlier by Nathamuni Mudaliar in 54 Tamil verses in his work entitled Thirumayilai Thalapuranam, which chronicles the history of various Shiva temples in Mylapore. The revised version of the work was later published as a book by N. Singaravelan Mudaliar in 1929. The Temple Directory of Madras City reports the claim that the temple was constructed by the Raja of Benares, although the dates are unknown. Joanne Punzo Waghorne, professor of religion at Syracuse University, cites this claim in her work and adds that a survey from 1990 dates the temple to the 16th century. She also notes that two men, one from the Naicker community and another from the Chettiar community, made some renovations in 1935 and that the remains of the ancient sacred tree was preserved and made a monument only in 1973. Three statues, namely, Valluvar's father, Valluvar's mother holding her child, and Valluvar seated in meditating posture, along with Valluvar's feet were installed in the same year during consecration to mark Valluvar's birthplace. Except for the stone idols in the temple, no traces of the original temple structure remain after the 20th-century renovation by the government. The original statue of Valluvar in the shrine is said to have been taken away by the government along with several palm-leaf manuscripts that were preserved in the temple. The bronze idols in the temple are believed to be made during the 19th century. After the renovation and consecration of 1973, consecrations were held in 1985 and 2001, and the most recent one was in 2020.

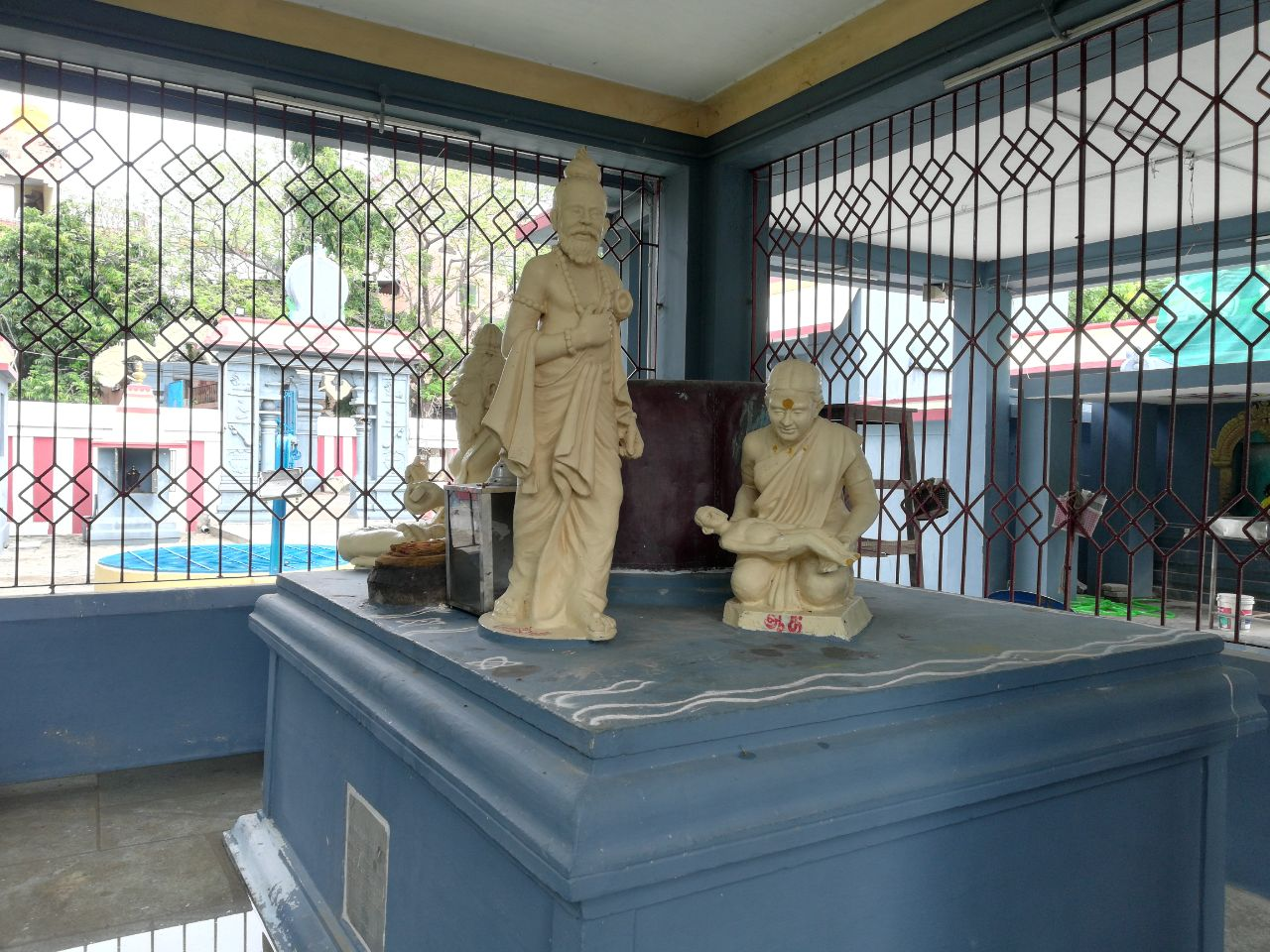
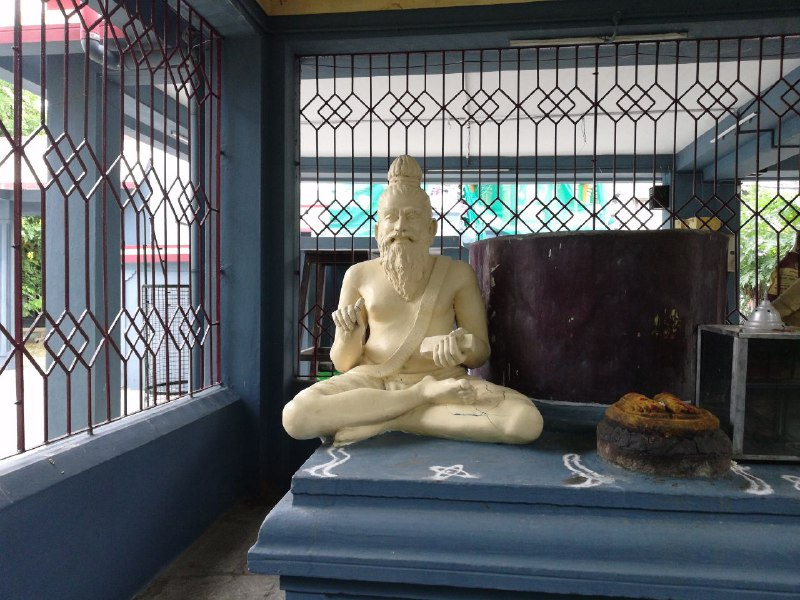
Statues installed at the temple

The tradition of celebrating Valluvar's birthday annually on Vaikasi Anusham (a day in May) was officially accepted on 18 and 19 May 1935, when a group of Tamil scholars and researchers congregated at the Pachaiyappa's College auditorium under the leadership of Maraimalai Adigal and officially declared Valluvar year and the Valluvar Day celebrations. A procession organized on the first day concluded at the Valluvar temple and a mass worship was organized at the temple on the same day. The temple was under the aegis of Sivagyana Mudaliyar before it was taken over by the Hindu Religious and Charity Endowment Department of the state government. In the neighbourhood of Mylapore, which is known for its "Sapta Sthana Shiva sthalas" or the sacred seven-some Shiva shrines (which includes the Karaneeswarar Temple, Tirttapaleeswarar Temple, Velleeswarar Temple, Virupakshiswarar Temple, Valeeswarar Temple, Malleeswarar Temple, and Kapaleeshwarar Temple), the Ekambareshwarar–Valluvar temple is traditionally considered the indispensable eighth.

== The temple ==
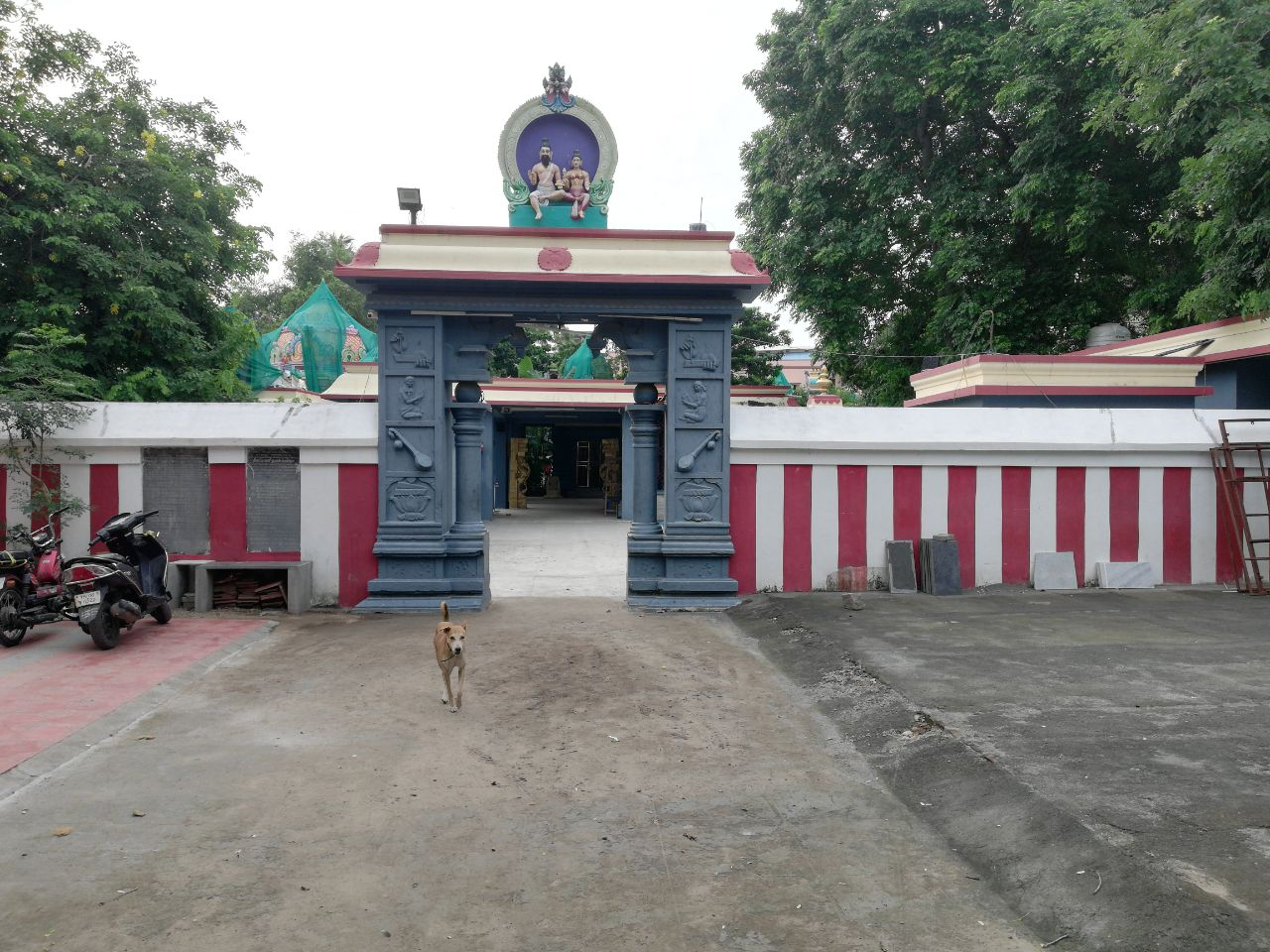
The entrance to the shrines within the temple complex

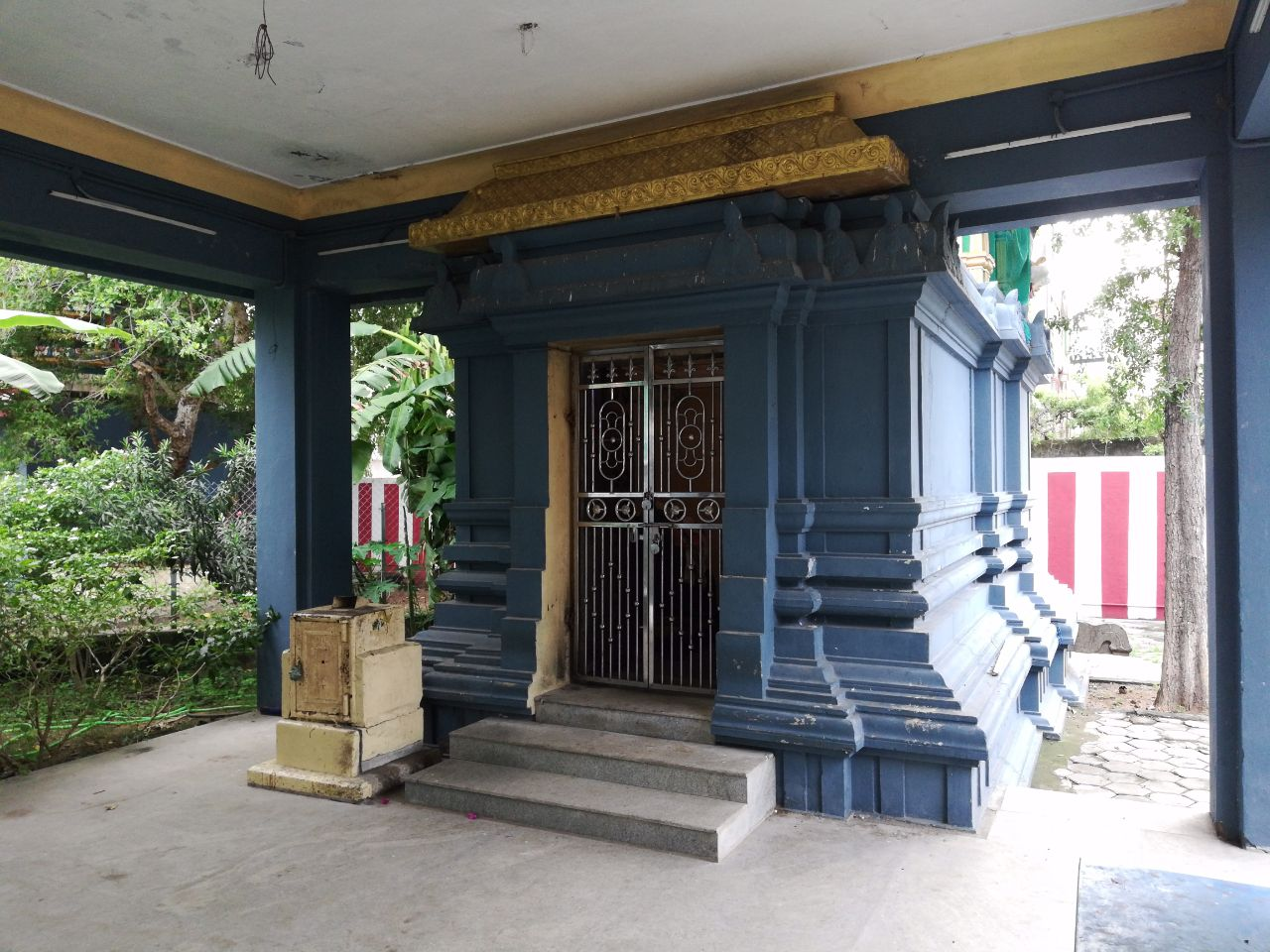
Valluvar's Sanctum at the temple

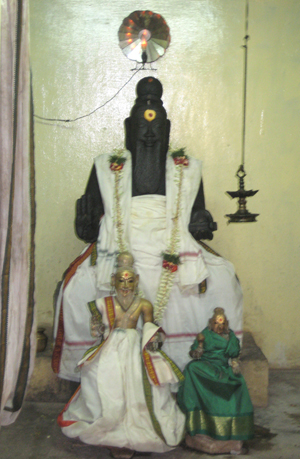
Idols of Valluvar and Vasuki inside the sanctum

The Valluvar shrine is located within the Ekambareswarar temple complex in a narrow lane adjacent to the Valluvar statue on Royapettah High Road, off Mundagakanni Amman Koil street at its northern end and off Nattu Subbaraya Street and behind the Thanithorai market in Mylapore. Situated on a 25-ground plot, the temple complex has exclusive sanctums for various deities, namely, Ganesha, Subramanya, Shiva (Ekambaranathar shiva linga) and Parvathi (Kamakshi), Thiruvalluvar and his consort Vasuki, Durga, the Navagrahas, and goddess Karumariamman (an incarnation of goddess Parvathi). On a traditional clockwise circumambulatory trip around the temple corridor, the shrines of Shiva and Parvathi appear along with Ganesha and Subramanya, followed by the sanctums of Karumariamman and nagakkal (carved stone slabs depicting holy snakes) representing Nagaraja beneath a holy neem tree (Azadirachta indica) at the southwestern corner of the temple complex. The lintel of the main shrine of Ekambaranathar bears the stucco idols of Valluvar worshiping Shiva and Parvathi. The palli arai, or the divine bedchamber, lies behind the Shiva shrine, where the processional deities are symbolically laid to rest for the day.

The sanctum of Valluvar is a two-roomed shrine enclosed by an open-pillared portico known as the maha mantapam or the meditation hall. The very first couplet of the Tirukkural is written at the entrance of Valluvar's sanctum. The Valluvar sanctum enshrines a large stone idol of Valluvar seated on a pedestal along with smaller bronze idols of both Valluvar and Vasuki below the pedestal. Valluvar's stone idol is sculpted in padmasana posture with chin mudra. The idol also features elongated ears, Linga on the head, rosary on one hand, palm-leaf manuscripts on the other, and a robe bearing the panchakshara mantra (five-lettered mantra) of "Namah Shivaya". The shikhara (a large cupola over the sanctum) of the Valluvar's shrine bears stucco idols of Valluvar. The main shrine of Vasuki is found at the northwestern corner of the temple complex near the Valluvar shrine. The idol of Vasuki is patterned after the Hindu deity Kamakshi inside the sanctum. The idols of all the main deities, including Ekambareshwarar, Valluvar, Vasuki, and Karumariamman face towards the east. The temple shikhara (spire) above the sanctum shows scenes of Hindu life and deities, along with Valluvar reading his couplets to his wife. The present sthala vriksha (sanctum tree) is located in front of the Vasuki sanctum, beside the meditation hall and the original sanctum tree. The walls of the temple are adorned with koshta images of deities such as Dakshinamurthy, Lingodbhava, Brahma, and goddess Durga. Other small sub-shrines within the temple complex include that of Hanuman, Chandikeshwara, Bhairava, and an individual shrine for Shaneeswara (planet Saturn). The processional deity of Ekambareswarar is stored in a temple vault opposite the temple's holy water well near the entrance. The temple grove is located on the northern side. The holy water well of the temple is associated with one of the legends of Vasuki's unfailing devotion towards Valluvar. A triad of neem, fig, and peepal trees that have grown together in an intertwined manner in the temple is considered an incarnation of the Trimurtis (the trinity of Hinduism). All the three trees are considered the temples sthala vrikshas (sacred trees) and are combinedly known as Shankaranarayana Vriksha.

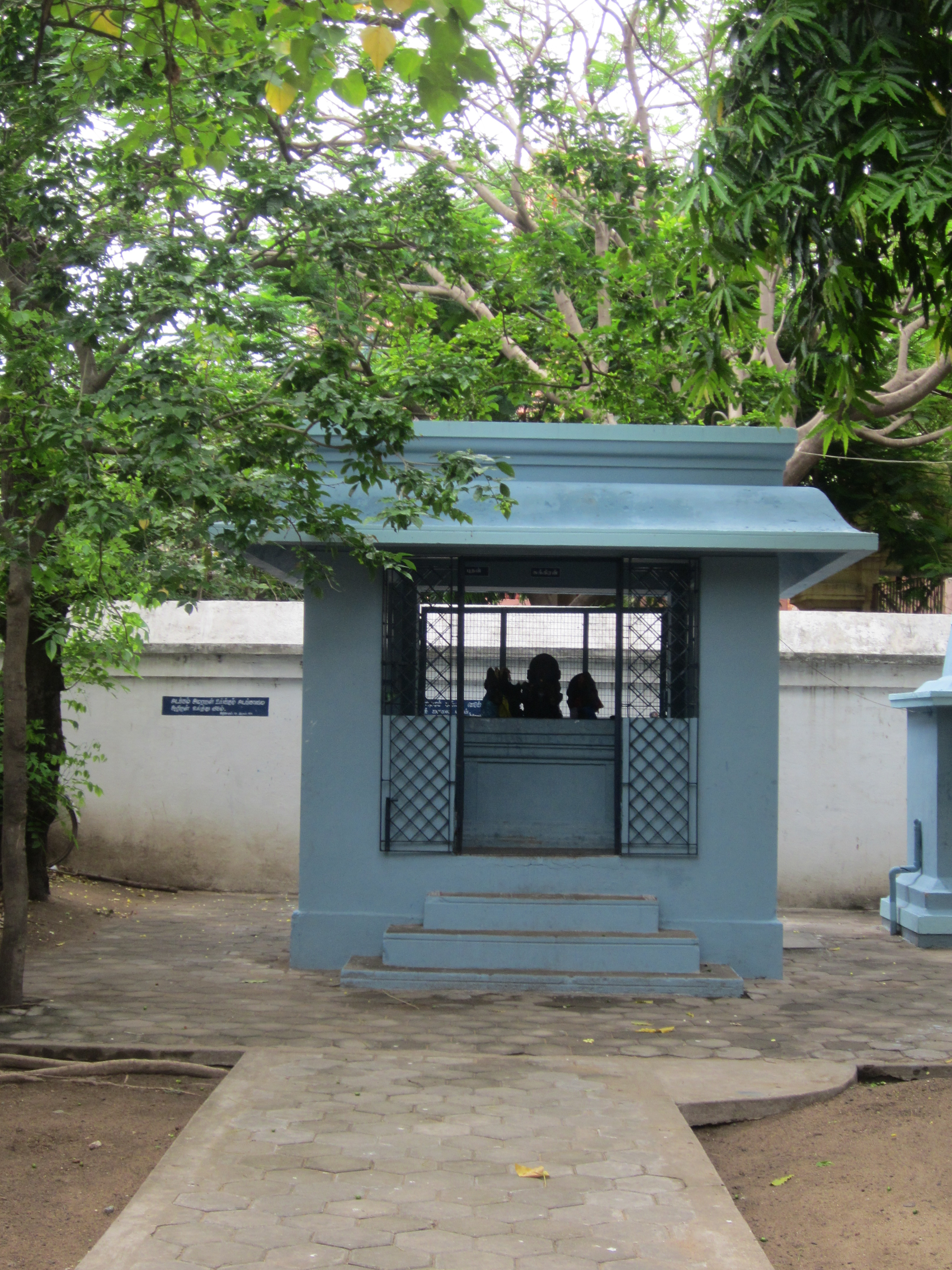
The navagraha shrine inside the temple complex

The temple's sthala vriksham (sanctum tree) is the iluppai or butter tree (Madhuca indica), grown near the original tree of the same species under which, according to tradition, Valluvar was found as a baby by his foster parents. The locals believe that this is where Valluvar was born. A chamber is built around the original tree. A Valluvar statue in yoga position holding a palm leaf manuscript of the Tirukkural sits on the pedestal around the original tree. A pedestal was built around the remains of the original tree in 1935 and is now braced up with copper sheets. The pedestal additionally holds an idol representing the feet of Valluvar made of black granite, along with the statues of Valluvar and his parents, Sri Adhi and Sri Bhagavan, with Adhi holding the baby Valluvar in her arms. Renovation of the temple began on 27 April 1973. Holy consecration (Kumbabishekam) of the temple took place on 23 January 2001. The temple comes under the purview of the nearby Mundakakanniamman temple and is under the ambit of the Hindu religious charity department of the Government of Tamil Nadu. There is also a library within the temple campus. A community centre named "Valluvar–Vasuki Community Hall" has been built near the temple. The temple also serves as the venue for meetings of Tamil language enthusiasts. Classes on the Tirukkural are also held in the evenings for children.

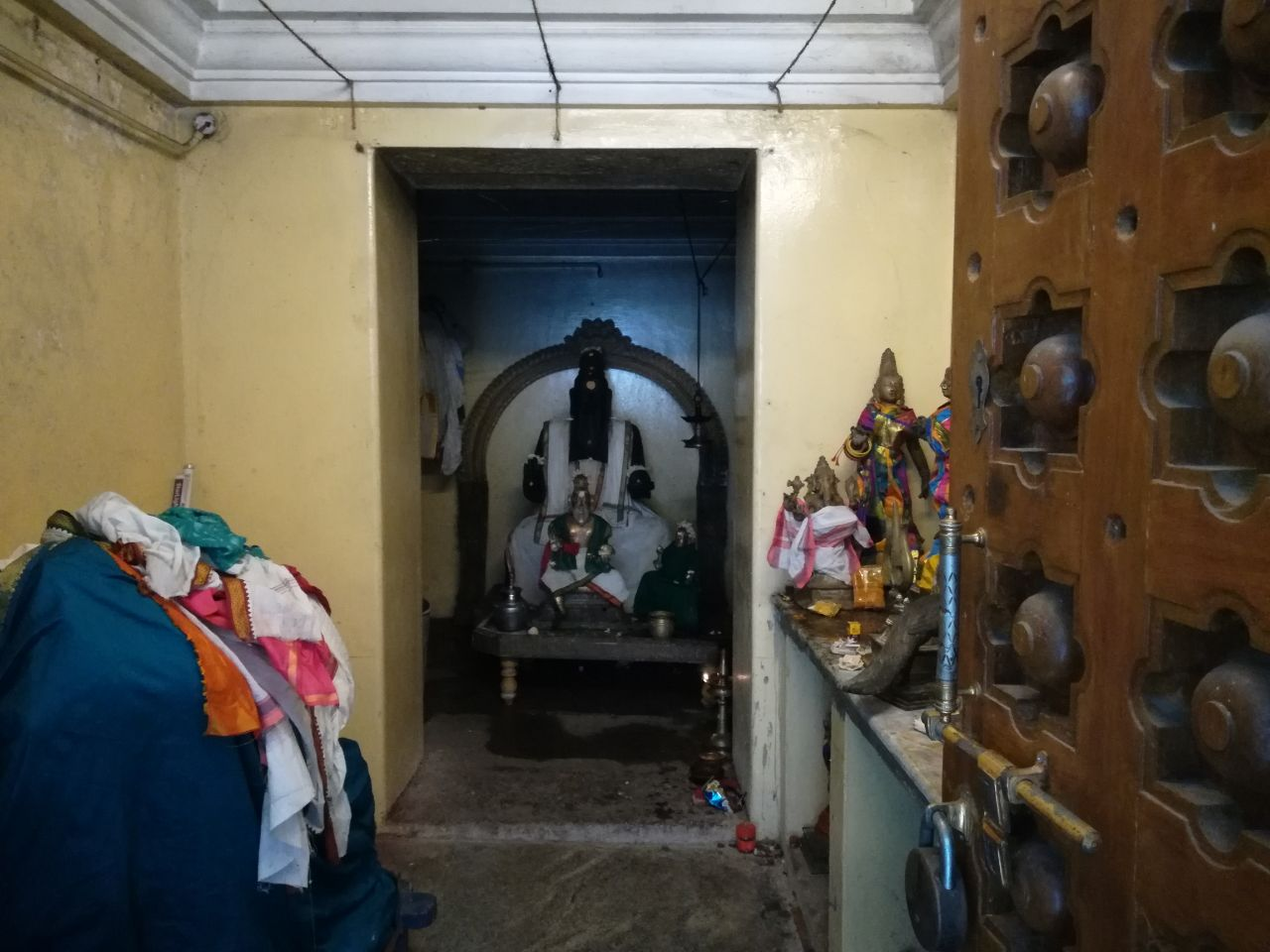
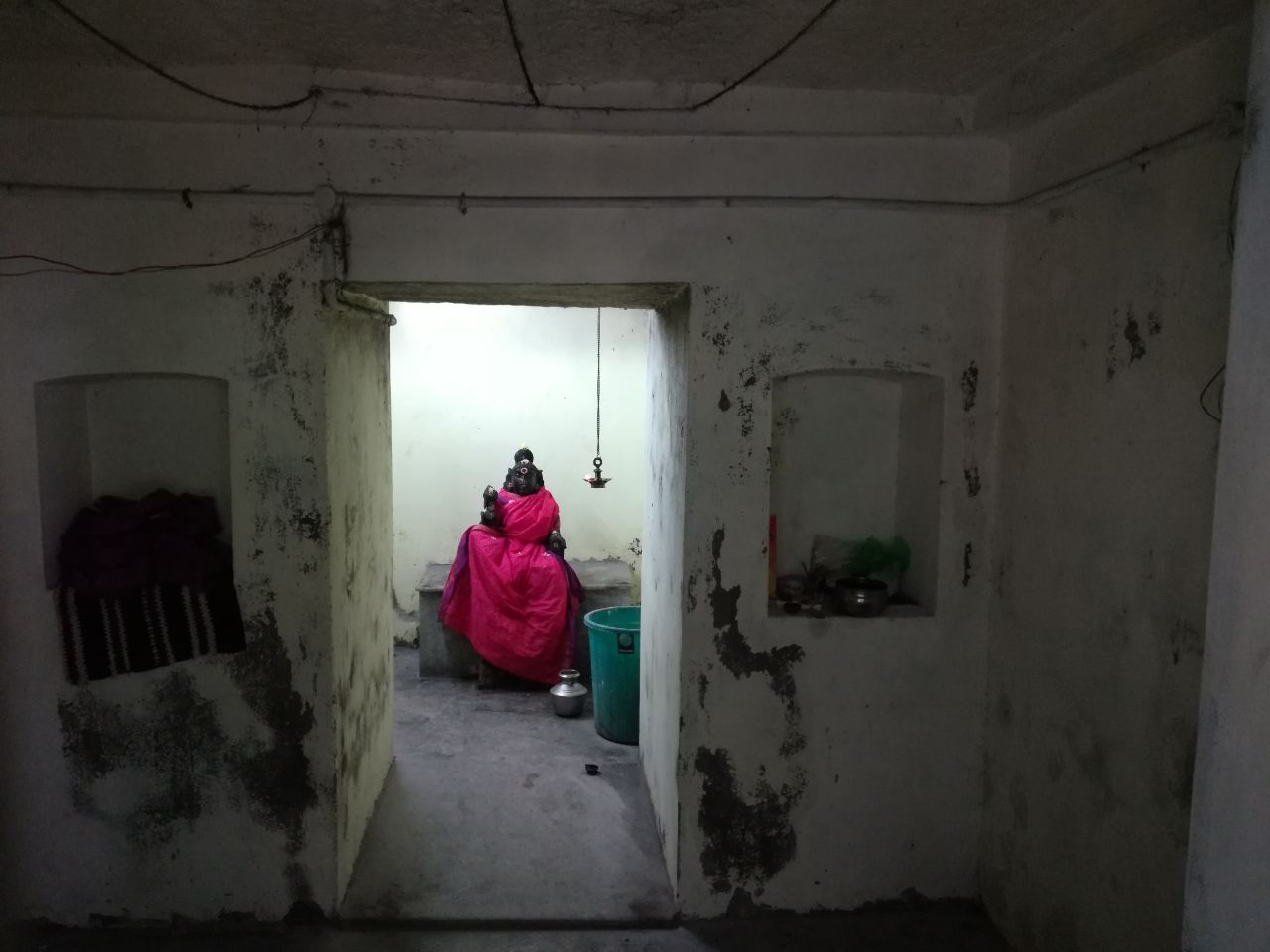
Idols at the sanctum. Left: Valluvar sanctum. Right: Vasuki sanctum

In the introduction to his 1897 book The Ethics of Kural, J. M. Nallaswamy Pillai, describes the statue at the temple thus:

Those of you, who wish to have our idea of the personal appearance of the sage, may proceed to his shrine at Mylapore, a minute's walk from the Barber's Bridge, and witness the statue of the canonized saint. The folded knot of his lock, the bushy moustache and beard sweeping over his breast, the gravity of the forehead, the broad eyes revealing his noble heart, and the grace of his majestic frame are such as remind one of Plato and Socrates. Add to these, the beads in his right and the moral code in the left hand, the saint in a sitting posture on a raised seat, seeming to impart instruction to his disciples, you will verily believe that he is a Tamil Rishi next to Agasthya. He is in fact said to be the great grandson of Agasthya. At least the genealogy framed by the pandits states so.

== Rituals and festivals ==
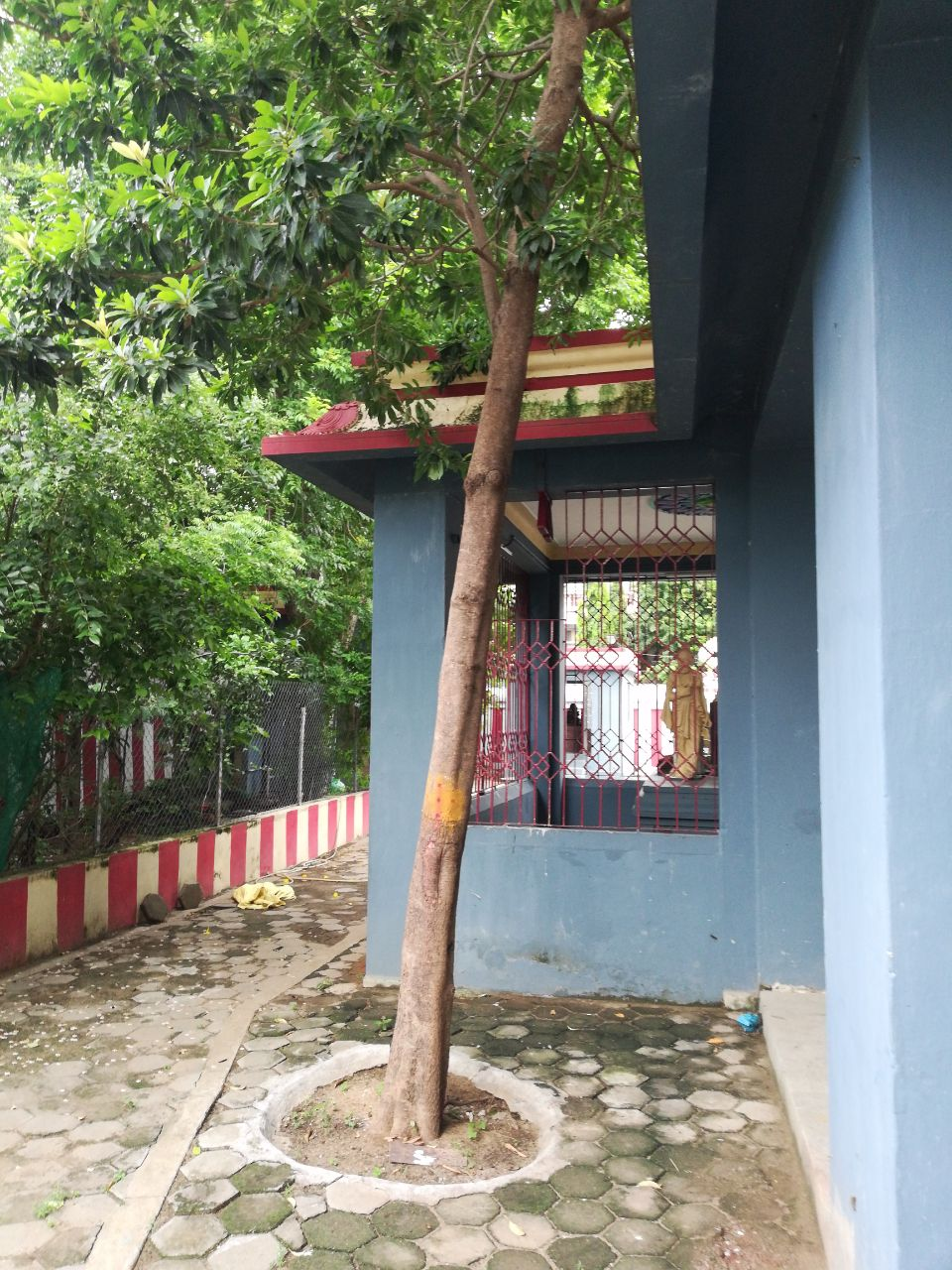
The sacred Iluppai tree at the temple, grown near the spot where the remains of the original tree are preserved

Although the official count of Nayanmars, or the canonical Saivite saints, is 63, Valluvar is often considered the 64th Nayanmar by various communities across South India as an important sign of honor, and several temples have the tradition of taking the idol of Valluvar in annual procession. The Valluvar temple at Mylapore, too, follows this tradition. On Arubathi Moovar, the 8th day of the grand annual festival of the Kapaleeshwarar temple known as the Panguni Brahmotsavam taking place on the Uthra star falling in the Tamil month of Panguni (March–April), which draws the maximum crowd during the series of events, the bronze idol of Valluvar and Vasuki are also taken in procession along with the idols of the 63 Nayanmars. According to historian V. Sriram, the festival is dated back to the 7th century CE. Thus, festivals in the temple can be categorized into two, namely one for the Shiva shrine and the other for the Valluvar shrine. For the Shiva shrine, the usual Shivite festivals are celebrated except the grand 10-day Brahmotsavam. For the Brahmotsavam, the Valluvar–Vasuki idols are placed on a palanquin and taken in procession as part of the Kapaleeshwarar temple annual events.

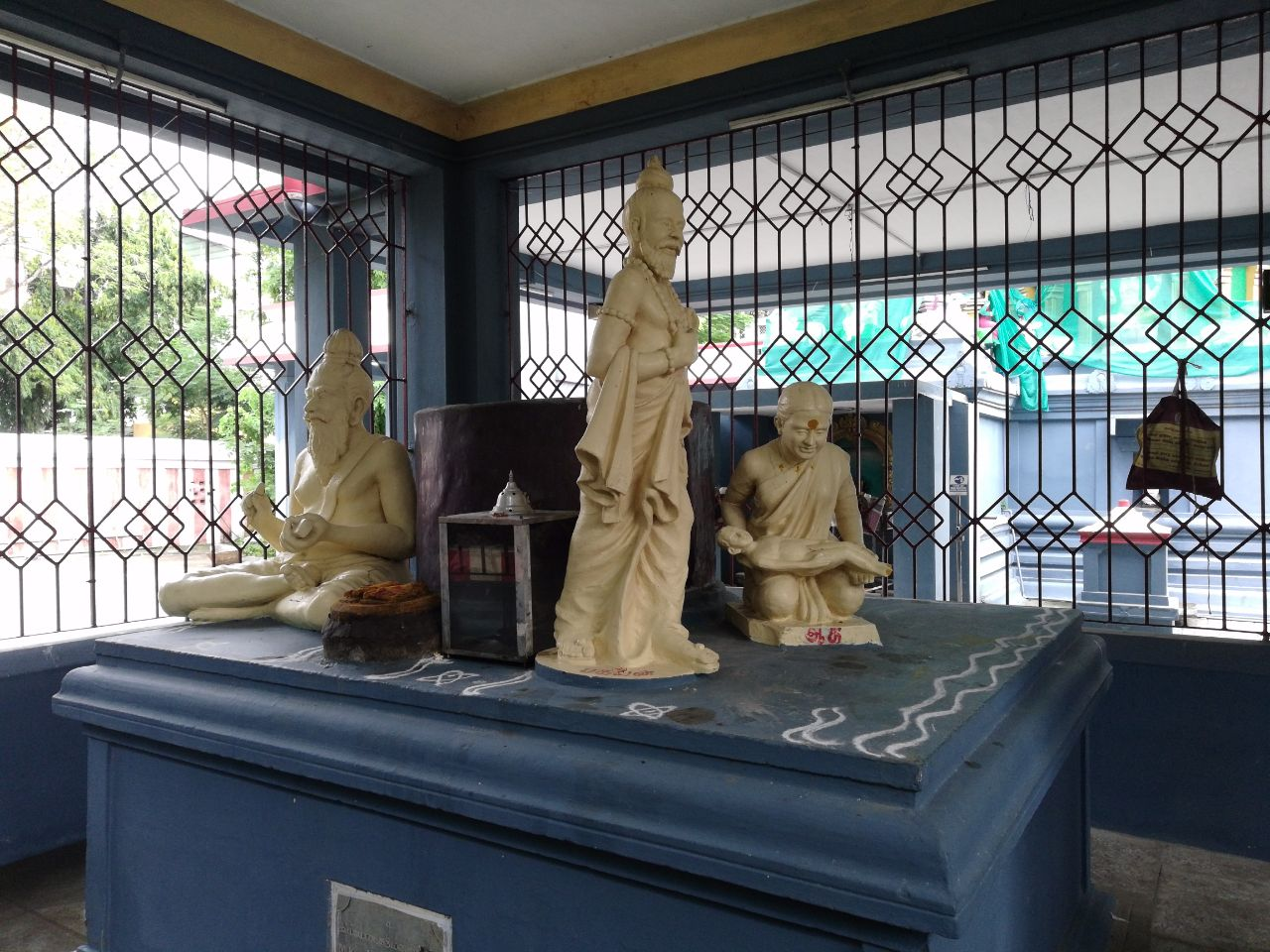
Statues of Valluvar and his parents holding him as a baby, on the pedestal built around the remains of the original holy tree

Like any other Hindu temple, the idols witness full traditional temple rituals on a daily basis. Abhishekam (bathing the idol) is performed twice a day, along with alankaram (decoration). In the morning, rice is offered as neivedhyam (offering). Draped in a white dhoti, the idol of Valluvar sports a dash of vibhuti (holy ash), kumkum (holy crimson), and sandalwood paste on the forehead. Poojas for Valluvar are performed in the morning while those for Ekambareshwarar in the morning and evening. The rituals are performed by the priests belonging to the Veerashaiva-Lingayat communities.

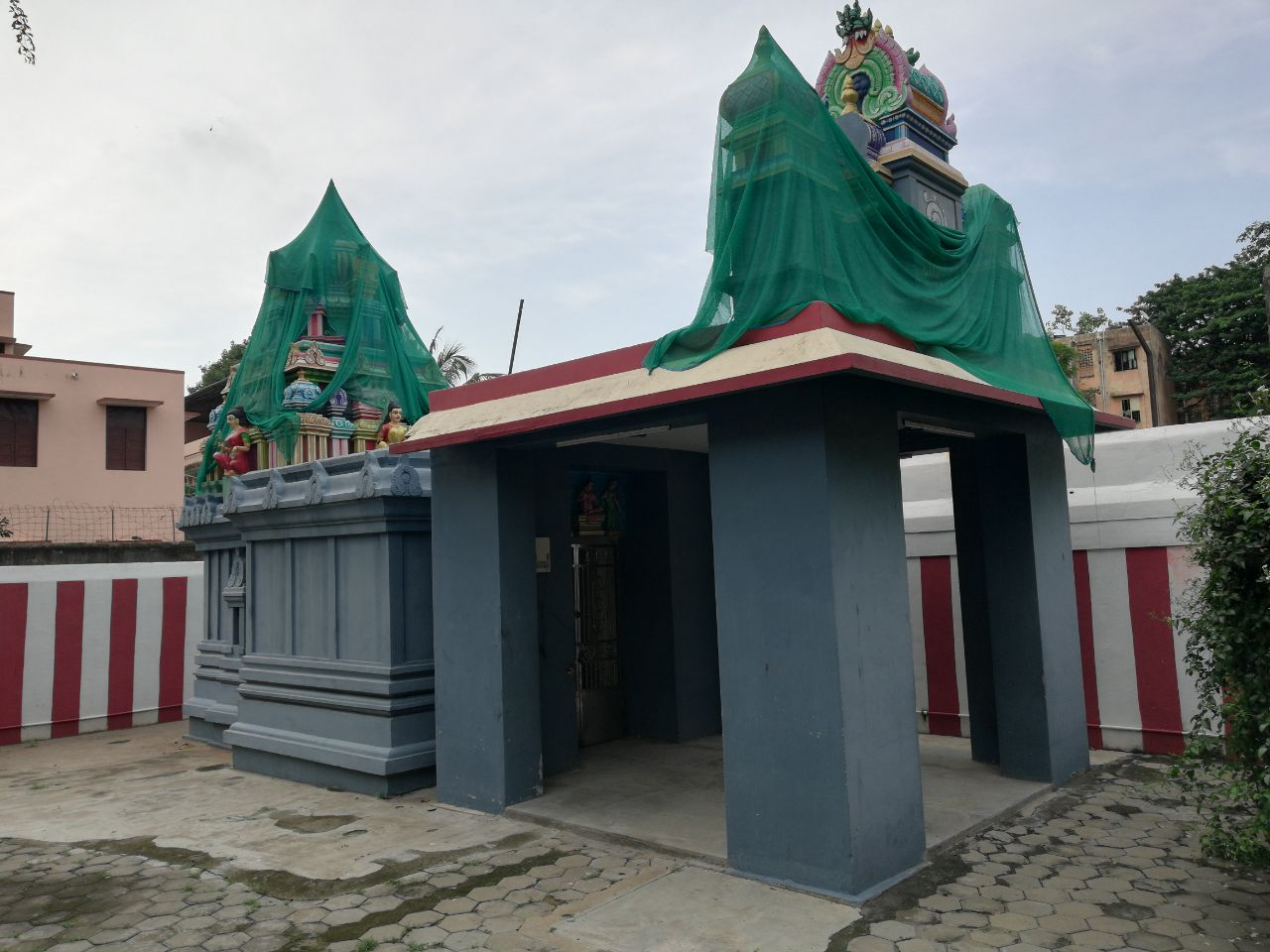
Vasuki Sanctum

Besides these daily services, special pujas are performed during the Arubathi Moovar festival (March–April), the second day of the Chitrai month (April), Thiruvalluvar day (a day notionally fixed by the Government of Tamil Nadu, falling in January), Chitra Pournami (full moon in the Tamil month of Chitrai, falling in March–April), and during the monthly Anusha star (the birth star of Valluvar). Chitra Pournami is when the wedding of Valluvar and Vasuki is believed to have taken place, and hence a symbolic marriage of idols of Valluvar and Vasuki is conducted annually on this day. The annual Vaikasi Anusham (Anusha star falling in the month of Vaikasi, around the month of early June) is celebrated as the birth day of the poet saint at the temple. Maasi Utharam (Uthram star falling in the Tamil month of Maasi, in the months of February–March) is another day of significance in the temple, since it is when Valluvar is believed to have attained mukthi or died. Thai Sadhayam (in the months of January–February) is celebrated as the wedding day of Ekambareshwarar and Kamakshi. Maasi Magham, Shivarathri, and Aavani Moolam are other important festivals celebrated at the temple.

According to legend, Valluvar gave some mud to Vasuki and asked her to cook it into food in order to marry her, which she did obligingly. To commemorate this, Pongal pots are kept in front of the sanctum sanctorum and on the Chitra Pournami day (falling in April), some mud is sprinkled into these pots before boiling rice into the dish of pongal. Annual processions are also held by large group of people to the temple to mark Thiruvalluvar Day.

== Funds ==
The temple is part of temples that are under the neighbouring Sri Mundagakanniamman Temple, also at Mylapore, and comes under the control of the Hindu Religious and Charity Endowment Department. Being a small temple, the Valluvar temple cannot sustain itself and uses the funds from other temples. The temple has no property and depends entirely on the Mundagakanni Amman Temple. The temple's primary income comes from the wedding hall, a paid parking space and a few shops. All the festivals are funded by devotees, and the events in the shrine are in part sponsored by the Mudaliar community, whose ancestors were Tamil scholars. The ancestors of the Mudaliar community are believed to have donated the bronze idols of the shrine.

In May 2023, the state government allocated ₹ 150 million for a complete renovation and restoration of the temple. The renovation plan included rebuilding all the temple halls (mantapams) with granite, refurbishing the ancient well, painting the entire temple complex, and landscaping. In 2025, a plan to reconstruct the shrine, replacing the old brick-and-mortar structure with new rough-cut granite structure highlighting a chariot pulled by elephants, at a cost of ₹ 190 million was announced.

== See also ==
- Tiruchuli Thiruvalluvar Temple
- Valluvar Kottam
- Heritage structures in Chennai
