= Malleeswarar Temple, Mylapore =

Hindu temple in Chennai, India

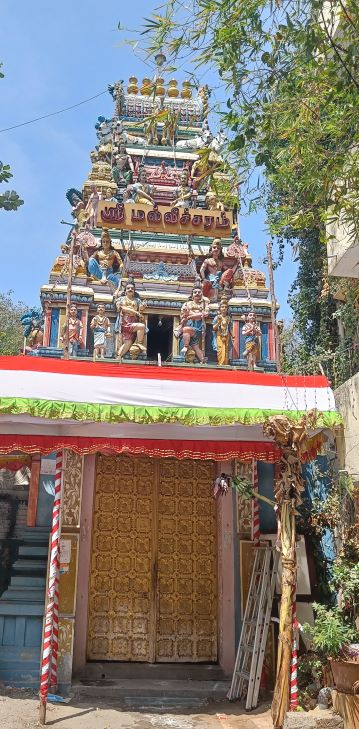

Religion
- Affiliation: Hinduism
- District: Chennai
- Deity: Lord Shiva

Location
- Location: Mylapore in Chennai
- State: Tamil Nadu
- Country: India
- Geographic coordinates: 13°02′20″N 80°16′22″E

Malleeswarar Temple is a Hindu temple located in Mylapore in Chennai, India. It is dedicated to Shiva.

== Sapta Sthana Shiva temples ==
This temple is one of the Sapta Sthana Shiva temples in Mylapore area (one of the seven sacred Shiva temples in Mylapore). They are:

1. Karaneeswarar Temple
2. Tirttapaleeswarar Temple
3. Velleeswarar Temple
4. Virupakshiswarar Temple
5. Valeeswarar Temple
6. Malleeswarar Temple
7. Kapaleeshwarar Temple

In addition to these "Sapta Sthana Shiva sthalas", the Ekambareshwarar–Valluvar temple in the neighbourhood is traditionally considered the indispensable eighth.

== Presiding deity ==
The presiding deity is known as Malleeswarar. The goddess is known as Marakatambikai. As there is more number of Jasmine trees the presiding deity is known as Malleeswarar.

== Opening time ==
The temple located at the rear side of Karaneeswarar Temple. It is opened for worship from 6.00 a.m. to 11.30 a.m and 4.30 p.m. to 8.30 p.m.

== See also ==
- Religion in Chennai
- Heritage structures in Chennai
