= Vyasarpadi =

- Neighbourhood
- Vyasarpadi (Chennai) Vyasarpadi (Tamil Nadu) Vyasarpadi (India)
- Coordinates: 13°07′06.2″N 80°15′33.8″E
- Country: India
- State: Tamil Nadu
- District: Chennai district
- Metro: Chennai
- Elevation: 29 m (95 ft)

Languages
  - Official: Tamil
- Time zone: UTC+5:30 (IST)
- PIN: 600039
- Vehicle registration: TN-05-yy-xxxx
- Lok Sabha constituency: Chennai North
- Vidhan Sabha constituency: Perambur

Vyasarpadi is a neighbourhood of Chennai, India. It is located within Chennai district. The neighbourhood is served by station, one of the oldest stations in South India. The first train to Arcot started from this station. The old ruins still remain 200 metres away from the current station as a cabin room. This place acts as the junction and four rail routes branch from here. The Southern line goes to Chennai Central. The Eastern line goes to Chennai Beach. The Northern line goes to Korukupet further proceeding to Gudur. The Western line goes to Perambur further proceeding to Arakkonam.

The station is named Vyasarpadi Jeeva, after veteran socialist leader Jeevanandam and in memory of his presence in Vyasarpadi.

== Etymology ==
Vysarpadi was named so by Elelasingan, a friend and disciple of Valluvar, around the 1st century BCE. He named the town thus for Sage Vyasa was said to have stayed in the town for some time while on his voyage to Mount Kailash.

== Landmarks ==
A Shiva temple known as the Ravishwarar Temple, which was built in the Chola's period, is situated here. Lord Shiva is named Ravishwarar. It is said the Lord is worshipped by the Sun. The Sun also took bath in the temple tank (Bhrama Theertham) to get rid of his Bhrama Dosham. The temple also has the goddesses. The Sun God is placed inside the sanctum of Lord Shiva facing him. Those worshipping Lord Shiva must also worship the Sun God in this temple. The temple has three sacred trees namely Vanni, Vilva and Naga Linga trees. A lot of people visit this temple on Sundays to get rid of various illnesses.

The Don Bosco Beautitudes School acts as a rehabilation cum Youth Association centre for the youth around this area. The Don Bosco Matriculation School and its church are famous in Chennai. The Roman Catholic church features Italian Architecture.

There is a market place and a "Ambedkar College of Arts and Science".

On 29 April 2009 around 4:50 a.m, a local train driven by unauthorized people crashed head on with a fuel train. Nearly 7 people died and half of the station was damaged. It was the setting of the flashback in the movie Anegan.

== See also ==
- History of Chennai
- Sathiyamurthy Nagar, a sub-district
- Timeline of Chennai history
