= Karaneeswarar Temple, Mylapore =

Temple in India

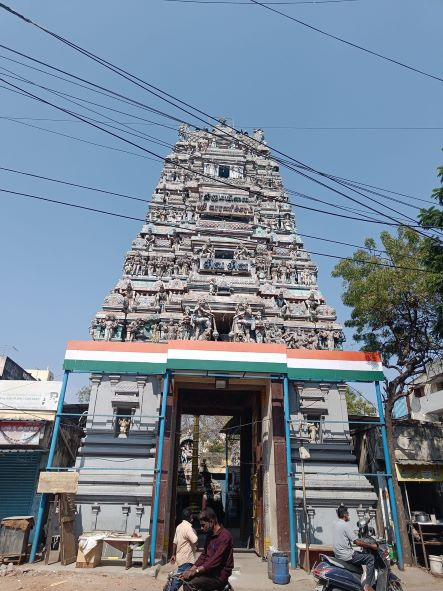

Religion
- Affiliation: Hinduism
- District: Chennai
- Deity: Shiva (Karaneeswarar)

Location
- Location: Mylapore in Chennai
- State: Tamil Nadu
- Country: India

The Karaneeswarar Temple is a 12th-century Hindu temple in the neighbourhood of Mylapore in Chennai, India. The temple is dedicated to Shiva as Karaneeswarar. There are also shrines to Sarvamangala Vinayaka (Ganesha), Dandapani (Kartikeya), Durga, Lakshmi and Saraswati.

== Legend ==
According to legend, a young Brahmin in Mylapore worshipped a lingam, a symbol of Shiva. Through his penance, he discovered that Shiva was responsible for the creation, protection, and destruction of the universe. Subsequently, the lingam became the main deity of this temple, came to be known as Karaneeswarar (literally "one who causes"). While there is no concrete proof, it is widely believed that this temple may date back to the 12th century CE.

== Architecture and Deities ==
The main deities of the temples are Karaneeswara (Shiva) and his consort Porkodi Amman (Parvati). The temple is located at Bazaar road in the middle stretch of the popular Kutcheri road in Mylapore. It is about half a kilometer from the famous Kapaleeswarar temple. Karaneeswara means "the Lord who is the cause" in Sanskrit. Shiva is believed to be the primordial cause of the universe which is his very form. He is also the Lord who can teach us the causality behind all events.

The main deities are found in two separate shrines. The temple has a small tower and as per the tradition followed in all old South Indian temples, this temple also has bali peeth, flag staff and Nandi idol facing the main shrine. The entrance of the main shrine has the idols of Shiva's son Ganesha and Dhandayudhapani (a form of Subramanya).

The following shrines are also found in this temple:

- Nataraja (Shiva as Lord of Dance) with his consort Sivakami
- Hanuman
- Bhairava
- Arunachaleswarar (a form of Shiva) as a lingam with his consort Annamalai
- Subramanya with his consorts Valli and Devasena
- Ganesha with his consorts Siddhi and Buddhi
- Saneeswarar
- Navagraha

The following idols are additionally found in this temple:

- Ganesha
- Nalvar – the four great devotees of Shiva
- Sekkilhar
- Surya
- 3–4 Shiv Lingas under the tree

== Religious practices ==
Devotees believe the temple visit can cure any ailment or disease. Karaneeswarar is also said to grant material boons. The worship of Karaneeswarar and his consort is said to grant a happy family life and amicability amongst family members.

An offering of a mixture—of coconut oil, sesame oil (gingelly) and castor oil in equal parts—to light oil lamps in multiples of six, is prescribed in this temple. Another important ritual is the Pradakshina (circumbulation).

== Religious Significance ==
Karaneeswara temple is one of the Sapta Sthana Shiva temples in Mylapore (one of the seven sacred Shiva temples in Mylapore). They are:

1. Karaneeswarar Temple
2. Tirttapaleeswarar Temple
3. Velleeswarar Temple
4. Virupakshiswarar Temple
5. Valeeswarar Temple
6. Malleeswarar Temple
7. Kapaleeshwarar Temple

In addition to these "Sapta Sthana Shiva sthalas", the Ekambareshwarar–Valluvar temple in the neighbourhood is traditionally considered the indispensable eighth.

== See also ==
- Religion in Chennai
- Heritage structures in Chennai
