= Velleeswarar Temple =

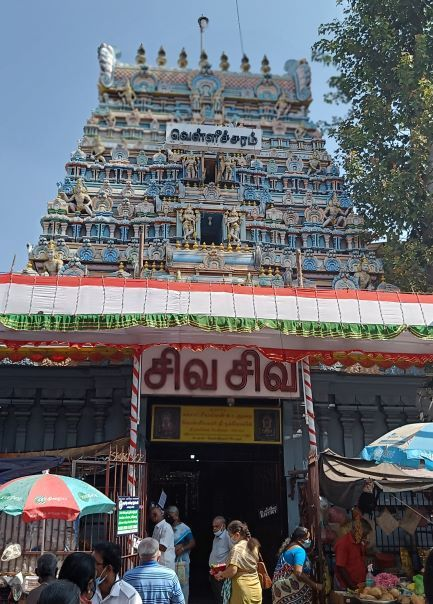

Religion
- Affiliation: Hinduism
- District: Chennai
- Deity: Shiva (Velleeswarar)

Location
- Location: Mylapore
- State: Tamil Nadu
- Country: India
- Interactive map of Velleeswarar Temple

Velleeswarar Temple is a Hindu temple in Mylapore, Chennai, Tamil nadu, India. The presiding deity is Shiva as Velleeswarar. This mid-sized temple, spread over 2 acres is one amongst the Seven Shiva Temples of Mylapore. It is situated at South Mada Street, closer to Kapaleeswarar Temple.

== Sapta Sthana Shiva temples ==
This temple is one of the Sapta Sthana Shiva temples in the Mylapore area. (one of the seven sacred Shiva temples in Mylapore). They are:

1. Karaneeswarar Temple
2. Tirttapaleeswarar Temple
3. Velleeswarar Temple
4. Virupakshiswarar Temple
5. Valeeswarar Temple
6. Malleeswarar Temple
7. Kapaleeshwarar Temple

In addition to these "Sapta Sthana Shiva sthalas", the Ekambareshwarar–Valluvar temple in the neighbourhood is traditionally considered the indispensable eighth.

== Legend and Religious Significance ==
Velleeswarar is the epithet of Shiva, as "Lord of Vellee"; Vellee being the god Shukra - the guru of the asuras (demons).

According to legend, when the asura king Mahabali was about to grant Vamana—an avatar of Vishnu—land as part of his sacrifice, Shukra tried to stop him, suspecting foul play. When Mahabali ignored his guru's request, Shukra went into the nozzle of Mahabali's kamandalu, blocking the water flow and thus Mahabali could not ritually grant Vamana the land by letting the water from the kamandalu on Vamana's hand. Vamana pricked the nozzle with a blade of darbha grass, which blinded Shukra.

Shukra meditated upon Shiva at this place in Mylapore and got his eyesight back.

It is said that one's eyes will be empowered with that spiritual vision that can perceive God, by worshipping at this temple. Velleeswarar is said to protect his devotees from falling prey to the desires inflamed by our eyes. Eye specialist doctors and patients of eye-related ailments are prescribed to worship Velleeswarar.

== Architecture and Deities ==
The temple is a mid-sized Temple with a five-tier vimana facing south. On entering the temple, there is a shrine of the god Ganesha in standing posture with his consorts Siddhi and Buddhi. This posture of Ganesha is said to be rare. The sanctum of Velleeswara (Shiva) has the lingam, the symbol of Shiva as the central icon facing East. Nearby is the shrine of Shiva's consort Kamakshi, a form of Parvati, who faces south. The idols of the Sapta-matrikas (seven mother goddesses) are installed around the circumbulation path of the Shiva shrine. One of the matrikas, Varahi is much venerated here.

There is an idol of Trivikrama (Vamana) behind Shiva's shrine. Also, the goddess Durga, who faces North, is worshipped. Furthermore, there is a shrine of Muthukumaraswamy (Kartikeya) along with his consorts Valli and Devasena in standing posture.

In the outer courtyard, the god Bhairava (a form of Shiva) is installed. On the left, there are shrines for Sarabeshwara (a form of Shiva), the goddess Pratyangira and Shukra praying to Shiva. In the outer courtyard, there are shrines of Shani and the Navagrahas along with the temple flagstaff.

== See also ==
- Religion in Chennai
