= Virupakshiswarar Temple, Mylapore =

Hindu temple in Chennai, India

Religion
- Affiliation: Hinduism
- District: Chennai
- Deity: Lord Shiva

Location
- Location: Mylapore in Chennai
- State: Tamil Nadu
- Country: India
- Geographic coordinates: 13°02′19″N 80°16′27″E

Virupakshiswarar Temple is a Hindu temple located in Mylapore in Chennai, India. It is dedicated to Shiva.

== Sapta Sthana Shiva temples ==
This temple is one of the Sapta Sthana Shiva temples in Mylapore area (one of the seven sacred Shiva temples in Mylapore). They are:

1. Karaneeswarar Temple
2. Tirttapaleeswarar Temple
3. Velleeswarar Temple
4. Virupakshiswarar Temple
5. Valeeswarar Temple
6. Malleeswarar Temple
7. Kapaleeshwarar Temple

In addition to these "Sapta Sthana Shiva sthalas", the Ekambareshwarar–Valluvar temple in the neighbourhood is traditionally considered the indispensable eighth.

== Presiding deity ==
The presiding deity is known as Virupakshiswarar. The goddess is known as Visalakshi. While Sundarar was worshipping the deity, as per his wish, the Lord blessed him with his Tandava of Nataraja.

== Opening time ==
The temple located near Karaneeswarar Temple in Mylapore. It is opened for worship from 6.30 a.m. to 12.00 a.m and 4.30 p.m. to 8.00 p.m.

== See also ==
- Religion in Chennai
- Heritage structures in Chennai
