= Tirttapaleeswarar Temple, Triplicane =

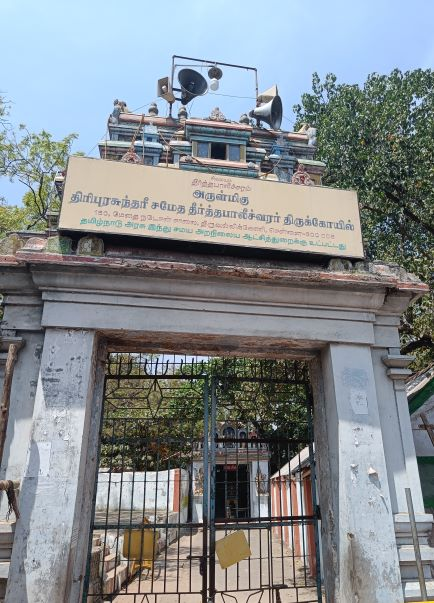

Religion
- Affiliation: Hinduism
- District: Chennai
- Deity: Shiva (Tirttapaleeswarar)

Location
- Location: Triplicane in Chennai
- State: Tamil Nadu
- Country: India
- Geographic coordinates: 13°02′53″N 80°16′28″E

Tirttapaleeswarar Temple is a Hindu temple located in Triplicane in Chennai, India. It is dedicated to Shiva as Tirttapaleeswarar.

== Sapta Sthana Shiva temples ==
This temple is one of the Sapta Sthana Shiva temples in Mylapore area (one of the seven sacred Shiva temples in Mylapore). They are:

1. Karaneeswarar Temple
2. Tirttapaleeswarar Temple
3. Velleeswarar Temple
4. Virupakshiswarar Temple
5. Valeeswarar Temple
6. Malleeswarar Temple
7. Kapaleeshwarar Temple

In addition to these "Sapta Sthana Shiva sthalas", the Ekambareshwarar–Valluvar temple in the neighbourhood is traditionally considered the indispensable eighth.

== Opening time ==
The temple located in Natesan Street in Mylapore-Triplicane road. It is opened for worship from 6.00 a.m. to 11.00 a.m and 5.30 p.m. to 9.00 p.m.

== See also ==
- Religion in Chennai
- Heritage structures in Chennai
