= Anusha =

Anusha is a name of multiple origins meaning "dawn" or "auspicious morning" in Sanskrit, and "immortal" or "ambrosial" in Persian (انوشه). Anusha may also be etymologically traced to the Tamil astronomical term anusham. The name Anusha also has Russian origins which means Grace in Russian.

Notable people with the name include:

- Anusha (actress) (born 1980), South Indian actress
- Anusha Dandekar (born 1981), Sudan-born Australian-Indian actress and VJ
- Anusha Mani, Indian female playback singer
- Anusha Rizvi (born 1978), Indian film director and screenwriter
- Neeragattu Anusha (born 1999), Andhraite cricketer
