= Mundaka Kanni Amman Temple =

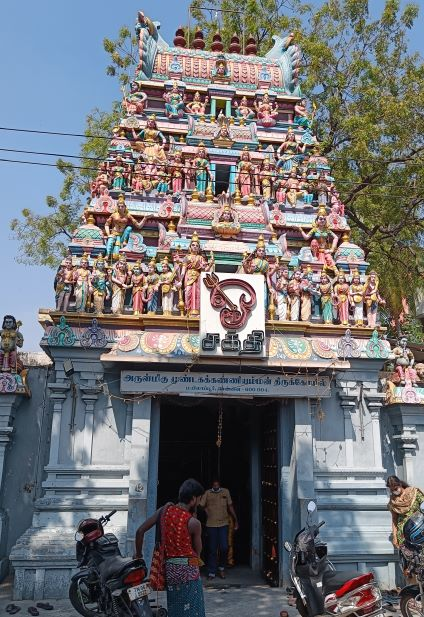

Religion
- Affiliation: Hinduism
- District: Chennai
- Deity: Lord Mariamman

Location
- Location: Chennai
- State: Tamil Nadu
- Country: India

Mundaka Kanni Amman Temple is a Hindu temple in the neighbourhood of Mylapore in Chennai, India. It is dedicated to Mariamman and used to be famous for animal sacrifices. The temple is one of the most famous shrines dedicated to Mariamman.

The neighbourhood is served by Mundakanniamman Koil railway station of the Chennai MRTS on the Chennai Beach - Velachery line.

== Location ==
In the Luz-Sanlthome road, at the left an arch could be seen. Through that route this temple could be reached.

== Structure ==
In the rear side of the presiding deity a tree is found. It is worshipped as the Temple tree. Facing east, this temple has a three-tier gopura. Sacred Ficus religiosa trees are found inside the temple. Vinayaka and Nāgas are also found inside.

== Presiding deity ==
Mundakanniamman is the presiding deity of the temple. She is one of the Avatars of Renukadevi and one among the Saptakannis.
