= Sir Sivaswami Kalalaya =

Sir Sivaswami Kalalaya Higher Secondary School

Sir Sivaswami Kalalaya is a co-educational school and Affiliated to Directorate of school Education, Tamil Nadu located in Mylapore, Chennai, Tamil Nadu, India.

== Council Members ==
President Sri T.R. Mani, Senior Advocate

Vice-President Sri K.V. Ramanathan, I.A.S. (Retd.)

Honorary-Secretary Dr.Smt. Vathsala Narayanaswami, Retd. Director, Sharmik Vidya Peeth.

Honorary-Joint Secretary & Treasurer Sri V.S. Subramanian, Business.

== History ==
=== Art and Craft ===
Students are taught drawing, painting, water color techniques, still-life composition and charcoal-based art work. The school has taken the initiative of providing exclusive training to the students in Folk Art, Madhubani and Warli.

=== Sports ===
The school offers coaching facilities for Karate, Basketball and gives scope for cricket too. The school conducts yearly tournaments for cricket and basketball.

=== Playground ===
The School has a Cement Basket Ball Court and a Playground.Preschool:

=== Senior Secondary (Classes XI & XII) ===
Science and Commerce streams are offered at this level.

=== Subjects ===
Core English - compulsory subject Group I - Physics, Chemistry, Maths, Biology / Computer Science. Group II - Accountancy, Business Studies, Economics, Mathematics / Informatics Practice / Marketing / Physiology.

=== Languages ===
The school follows the three-language formula as per the language policy. Students learn 2 languages—English & Hindi or Tamil up to Class IV. The third language is studied from Classes V-VIII and this reverts to a two-language pattern in the secondary school. Only one language needs to be studied at the Senior Secondary level. The students would have to study Hindi as one of the languages in Classes V-VIII.
