= Kaveripakkam =

- Town
- Nickname: Kaveripauk
- Location in Tamil Nadu, India
- Coordinates: 12.901667°N 79.463889°E
- Country: India
- State: Tamil Nadu
- Region: Ranipet
- District: Ranipet
- Talukas: Nemili
- Elevation: 160 m (520 ft)

Population (2011)
  - Total: 14,583

Languages
  - Official: Tamil
- Time zone: UTC+5:30 (IST)
- PIN: 632 508
- Telephone code: 04177
- Vehicle registration: TN-73
- Lok Sabha constituency: Arakkonam Lok Sabha constituency
- Vidhan Sabha constituency: Sholinghur
- Other Languages: Telugu, Urdu

Kaveripakkam is a town panchayat in Ranipet district in the Indian state of Tamil Nadu.

== Demographics ==
As of the 2011 India census, Kaveripakkam had a population of 14,583. Males constitute 50% of the population and females 50%. Kaveripakkam has an average literacy rate of 72%, higher than the national average of 59.5%: male literacy is 79%, and female literacy is 64%. In Kaveripakkam, 9% of the population is under 6 years of age.

== Attractions ==
Kaveripakkam has a lake built by King Nandivarman III of Pallava dynasty. This place was called 'Kavithapakkam' during the reign of the Pallavas. Recent excavations have unearthed 16th century artifacts such as pottery materials and burnt clay products. These artifacts are now displayed at Government Museum in Vellore.

Kaveripakkam lake is the second largest lake in Tamil Nadu. This lake irrigates more than 30 villages.

== Location ==
On the northern banks of the Palar River, Kaveripakkam is a town in Ranipet district of Tamil Nadu. This town, also known as Kaveripak, is 10 km east of Walajapet and 30 km from Kanchipuram.

Kaveripakkam is about 100 km west of Chennai, 40 km east of Vellore and 28 km west of Kanchipuram. Kaveripakkam has more than 50 small villages around the town. Kaveripakkam is the entry town of Ranipet Dist

== Politics ==
This town is part of the Sholingur (state assembly constituency) and Arakkonam (Lok Sabha constituency).

== Notable residents ==
- Ariyanatha Mudaliar, the Prime Minister of Krishnadevaroya was born in Kaveripakkam.
- Vasuki, the wife of Tamil poet-philosopher Valluvar.
