= Sathiya Moorthy Nagar =

Sathiya Moorthy_Nagar
- village
- Location within Chennai Location within Tamil Nadu Location within India
- Coordinates: 13°07′N 80°16′E
- Country: India
- State: Tamil Nadu

Languages
  - Official: Tamil
- Time zone: UTC+5:30 (IST)

Sathiamurthy Nagar is located in the Vyasarpadi area of Chennai city in Tamil Nadu.
