= Ravishwarar Temple =

Shiva temple in Chennai district, Tamil Nadu, India

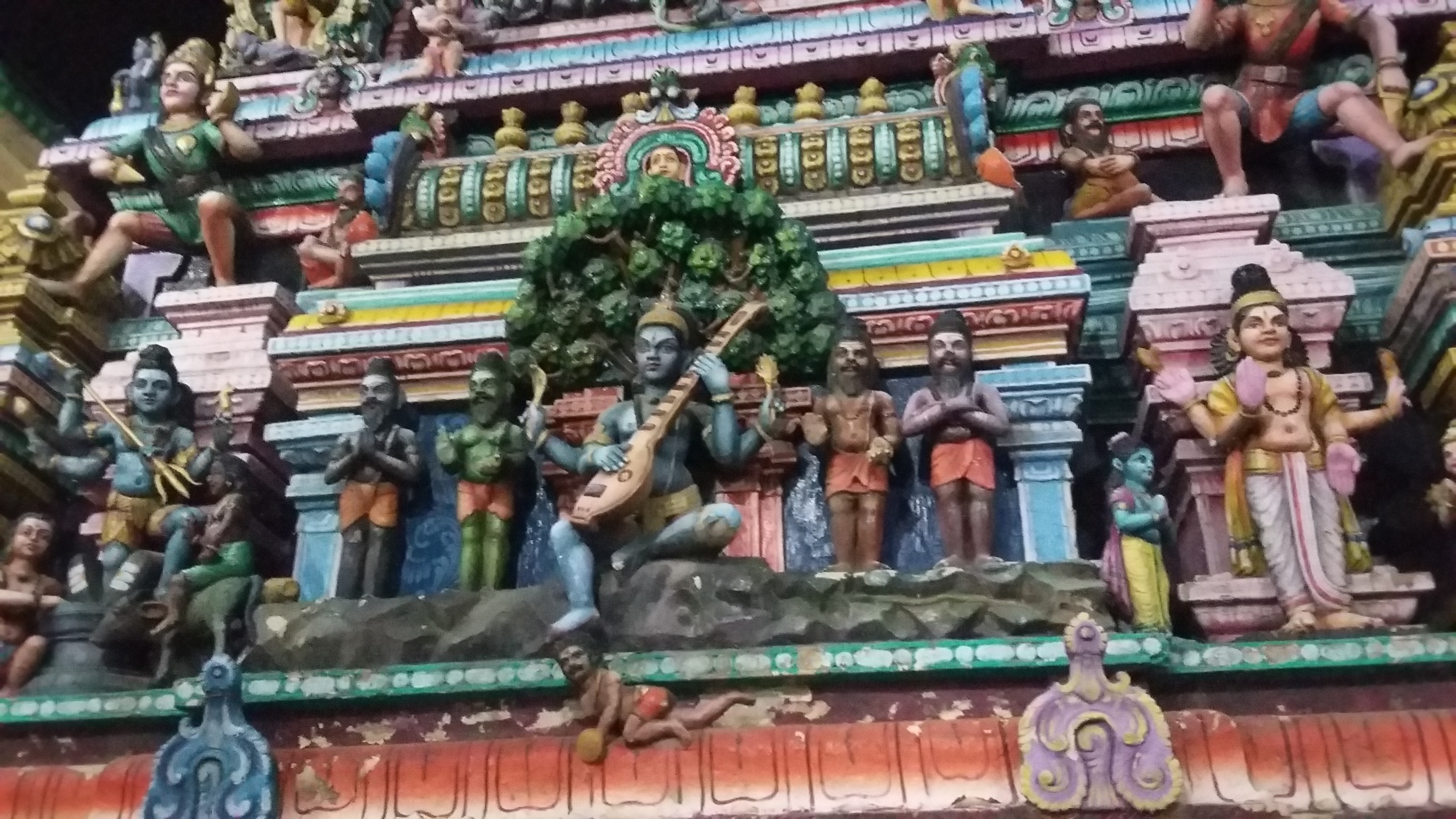
- The main gopuram of the temple

- Location within Chennai Location within Tamil Nadu Location within India

Religion
- Affiliation: Hinduism
- District: Chennai
- Deity: Lord (Shiva)

Location
- Location: Vyasarpadi
- State: Tamil Nadu
- Country: India
- Interactive map of Ravishwarar Temple
- Coordinates: 13.1157°N 80.2617°E

Ravishwarar Temple is a Hindu temple in Chennai, India. Built during the Chola period, the temple is dedicated to Shiva. It is located at Murthy Iyengar Street in the northern neighbourhood of Vyasarpadi.

== History ==
The temple dates back to the Chola time.

== The temple ==
The main deity in the temple is Lord Ravishwarar, ("Ravi" or Surya, meaning the Sun), facing east, and his consort goddess Marakadhambal, facing south. The temple has a 3-tier rajagopuram (main tower). It is said that the lord here was worshiped by the sun god. The sun god also bathed in the temple tank, known as the Bhrama Theertham or Surya Theertham, to get rid of his Bhrama Dosham (curse). The sun god is placed inside the sanctum of Lord Shiva, facing the east-facing Lord. Lord Shiva is worshiped along with the sun god. The Shiva sanctum has a Shiva Ling–shaped hole through which sunlight enters the sanctum.

The sacred tree of the temple is Vanni. Other trees in the temple includes Vilva and Naga Linga trees. Many visit the temple on Sundays to get rid of illness and to perform various pariharams.

Other shrines within the temple include those of Vishnu, Nataraja, Bhairava, Sundara Vinayaka (Lord Ganesha), Muruga along with his consorts Valli and Deivanai, Ayyappa, and Hanuman.

The idol of Saint Vyasar is also present in the temple. Legend has it that Vyasa worshiped and praised the Lord, giving the neighborhood its name. The temple was also worshiped by King Veechawaran.

== Festivities ==
Special days of worship in the temple include Sundays, the first days of uttharayanam and dhakshinayanam (equinoxes), Makar Sankranti (Pongal day, around the 14th of January), Rathasapthami, Aani Brahmmotsavam (June–July), Aippasi Skanda Shashti (October–November), Maasi Magham (February–March), and Panguni Utthram (March–April).

On the tenth day of the annual Navarathri events, Mahisha Vadha (killing of demon Mahisha) is celebrated, during which a plantain stem is tied in front of the goddess's sanctum, along with leaves of the Vanni tree to personify Mahisha, and is chopped to mark the event of the killing of the demon.

== See also ==
- Religion in Chennai
