= Elelasingan =

Elelasingan (Tamil: ஏலேலசிங்கன்) (between c. 1st century BCE and 5th century CE), also known as Elelasimha, Elelasingan Chettiyar, Elela and Alara, was a Tamil merchant who lived in Mylapore, by the shores of the Pallava Kingdom, trading between India and Ceylon. He is best known as the contemporary, friend, and disciple of the celebrated Tamil poet and philosopher Valluvar.

== Biography ==
It is said that Elelasingan is mentioned as Elaela and Alara in Ceylon history, who lived between 144 BCE and 101 BCE. M. S. Purnalingam Pillai cites that, according to Mahavamso tradition, Elelasingan ruled Lanka as Ellalan with his capital at Annuradhapura between 205 BCE and 161 BCE. However, given the fact that Elelasingan was a contemporary of Valluvar and with the date of Valluvar remaining dubious, it is still under debate whether Elaela of Ceylon was the same person as Elelasingan. According to T. S. Srinivasan, Elela Singhan was a prince who lived in the first century CE and was a friend of Valluvar.

Elelasingan belonged to the Karaya or Parava community and was a merchant by profession. He was also the chief of the townsmen at Mylapore. He was wealthy and is said to have owned vessels and had trade with foreign countries, chiefly Ceylon. He also sold thread to Valluvar, who earned a living by engaging in his occupation as a weaver. Over the years, Elelasingan became a close friend and a disciple of Valluvar.

Elelasingan and his wife had been without a child for years. One day when visiting the local Shiva temple, they found a baby lying beside a cow. The couple adopted the baby as their own and named it Arlyakananthar. It is believed that it was none other than Arlyakananthar who requested Valluvar to "write an ethical treatise for the world's good." Valluvar acceded and eventually authored the Kural text. Elelasingan, along with other friends, advised Valluvar to travel to Madurai and present his work at the Pandiyan King's court. When Valluvar did so and returned triumphantly, Elelasingan and others welcomed him and celebrated the happening.

According to legend, at the point of Valluvar's death, Elelasingan expressed his intention to place Valluvar's corpse in a golden coffin and place it in a monumental grave. Valluvar, however, politely refused and instead requested Elelasingan to tie his corpse with cords and throw it among the bushes outside the town so that scavenging animals can feed on it. Elelasingan obeyed and soon observed that the crows and other animals that fed on his corpse "became beautiful as gold." He soon built a temple on the spot where Valluvar's corpse had lain and instituted worship. It is believed that the present temple of Valluvar at Mylapore is built on the site of this ancient temple.

== Legacy ==
Elelasingan is traditionally remembered for his faithful following of the philosophy of Valluvar. The old Tamil maxim "ஏலேலசிங்கன் பொருள் ஏழுகடல் போனாலும் திரும்பும்" (literally "The goods of Elelasingan make a safe return albeit crossing seven seas") and the work songs of "Elelo elavali" and "Elelo aylasa", which are traditionally sung by hard laborers of the Tamil land during their toil at work to mitigate their drudgery, remain embedded in the Tamil culture as the sole surviving legacy of Elelasingan.

== See also ==
- Vasuki
- Thiruvalluvar Temple, Mylapore
