= Luz Anjaneya Temple =

Religion
- Affiliation: Hinduism
- District: Chennai
- Deity: Lord Hanuman

Location
- Location: Chennai
- State: Tamil Nadu
- Country: India

The Mylapore Anjaneyar Devasthanam, commonly known as the Luz Anjaneya Temple, is the oldest temple of Hanuman in the city of Chennai, India. It is located in the neighbourhood of Mylapore in the area known as Luz.

== History ==
The Luz Anjaneya temple was constructed by Salivahana Chettiars from Mysore who migrated and settled down in Mylapore in the 18th century. With land granted by the Nawab of the Carnatic, the Chettiars constructed two Vinayaga temples. While digging a well, they found the self-manifested idol of the Hindu god Hanuman. As a result, they constructed a Hanuman temple on the spot. A shrine to the Hindu god Rama was constructed within the complex in 1954. The temple celebrated its 200th anniversary in 2000.

The temple is managed by the Salivahana Chettiyar Trust for more than a couple of centuries. The trust also manages the Sundara Vinayagar and Selva Vinayagar temples, both of which are located close to the Anjaneya temple. The idol in the temple, believed to be self-manifested, is said to be more than 600 years old.

The last kumbabhishekam (consecration) of the temple took place in 2012.

== The Temple ==
The temple is the oldest temple dedicated to Hanuman in Chennai. Initially consisted only of the Hanuman sanctum, the temple was later expanded with other shrines. Two sanctums, both facing west, are placed next to each other near the main entrance. The main sanctum is dedicated to Hanuman. The unique feature of the idol in the temple is that the entire face of the Hanuman idol is turned to face to its left, towards south.

The other sanctum is that of Kothandaramar alongside Lakshmana and Sitadevi. Utsava murthies are located on the left side of the sanctums. Special occasions observed in the temple include Hanumath Jayanthi, Rama Navami and Gokulashtami. On Hanumath Jayanthi (birthday of Hanuman) and Rama Navami (birthday of Rama), the utsava murthies of Rama and Anjaneyar will be taken out on a procession.

== See also ==
- Religion in Chennai
