= Vasuki (wife of Valluvar) =

Wife of the Tamil poet Valluvar

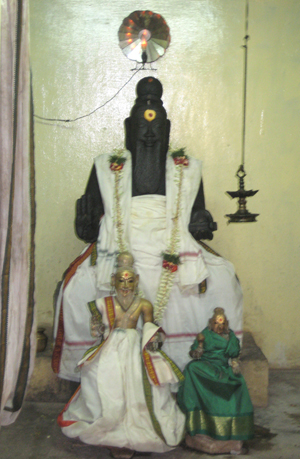
Idols of Valluvar and Vasuki kept near a statue of Valluvar at the Mylapore Thiruvalluvar Temple

Vasuki (Tamil: வாசுகி) is assumed to be a Tamil woman who lived around the late or post Sangam era (between 1st century BCE and 5th century CE). She is assumed to be the wife of the Tamil poet-philosopher Valluvar. She is traditionally considered a faithful wife and a model for Tamil womanhood.

== Biography ==
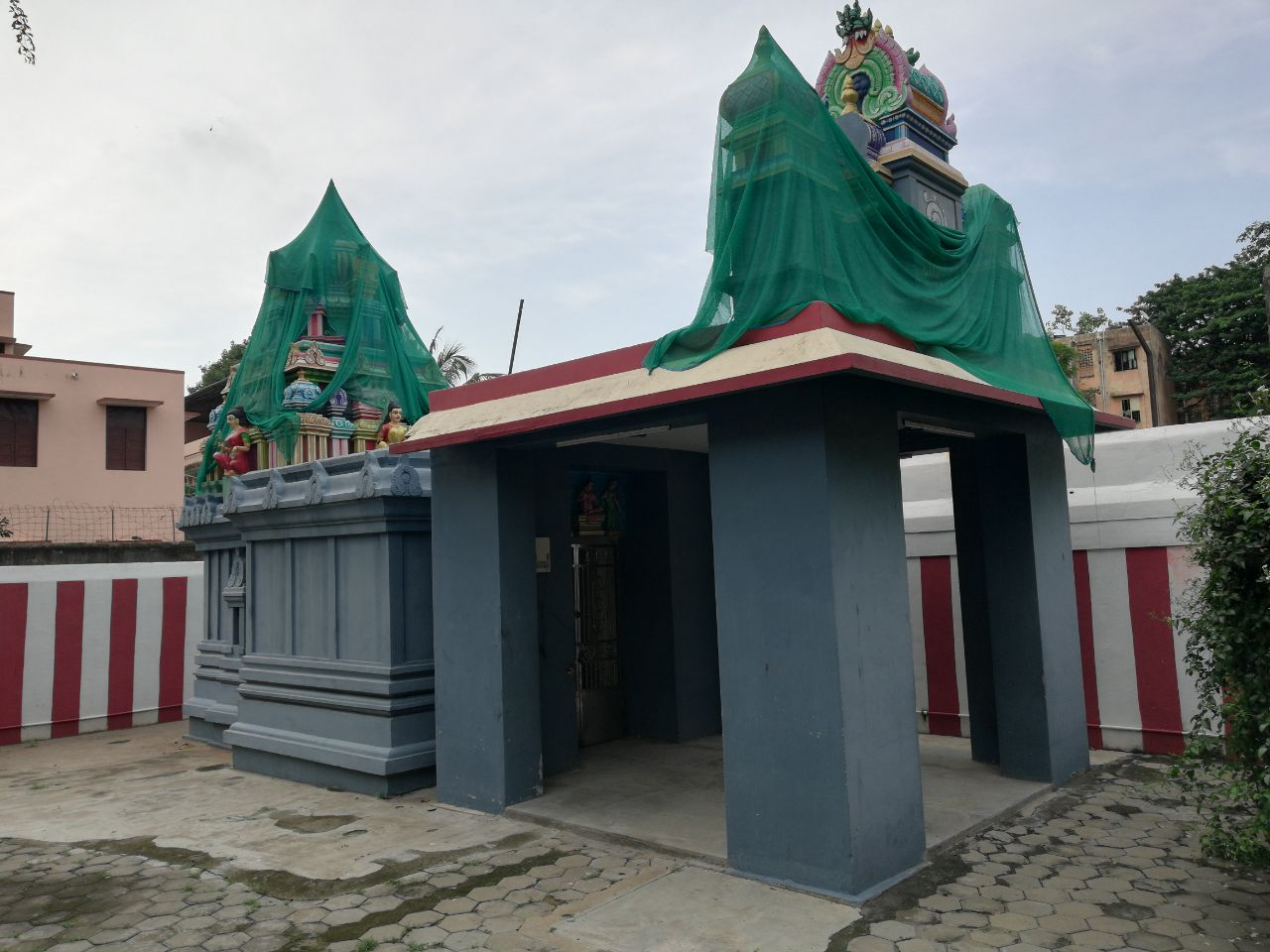
The sanctum of Vasuki at the Mylapore Valluvar Temple

Very little is known about the life of Vasuki other than her being assumed as the wife of Valluvar. According to Maraimalai Adigal, Vasuki was also known as Nagi. She was one of the daughters of Margaseyan (or Margasahayan), a farmer who lived near Kaviripakkam, and his wife Ambujam. It is said that when Margasahayan's crops contracted disease, Valluvar helped with curing them. As a token of gratitude, Margasahayan offered Valluvar his daughter in marriage. Legend has it that Valluvar asked Vasuki to cook a handful of sand in order to test her before taking her in marriage, and Vasuki miraculously turned it to boiled rice and served him a scrumptious meal. She is considered as a chaste and pious woman and the model for an ideal Tamil housewife. The couple, however, is not known to have any children. Traditional, as well as legendary, accounts about her abound, which have been the subject of historical analysis for centuries. Some details about Vasuki, however, are of doubtful historicity.

Traditional accounts hold that Valluvar requested Vasuki to place a toothpick and a bowl of water alongside his dinner plate every day. Without any question, Vasuki dutifully obeyed her husband's command till the end of her life. Strangely as it may seem, Valluvar never used either of the two that he requested. This, however, did not deter Vasuki from following what her husband said even once. Toward the end of her life, Vasuki remained sullen about her lack of understanding about her husband's dining behavior. Valluvar, perceiving the trouble that he created for his wife by not revealing the reason behind his dining behavior, apologized and said, "It would be a great sin if a grain of rice that I was eating accidentally fell on to the floor. Using the toothpick, I could pick up the fallen grain, rinse it in the bowl of water and eat it thereafter. It is wrong to let our food go to waste." Vasuki died peacefully upon hearing this. This incident is considered as revealing both the sincerity of Valluvar and the devotedness of Vasuki towards her husband.

Other legendary accounts depicting the divine qualities of Vasuki include:

- Once when Valluvar summoned Vasuki while she was in the act of drawing water from the well, Vasuki, without giving it a second thought, left the vessel suspended halfway and hastened to her husband. The vessel is said to have remained in its position until she returned to it.
- One morning, not following the customary routine, wherein hot rice is generally served minutes after boiling, Vasuki served cold rice boiled the day before, and Valluvar sarcastically exclaimed that the rice was burning him. Vasuki instantly ran for a fan to cool him.
- One bright noon, Valluvar missed his shuttle while he was engaged in his occupation as a weaver and dropped it to the ground. In the daylight the shuttle was distinctly visible. However, when he requested that his wife fetch a light, Vasuki did so without questioning the illogicality of the situation.

== Death ==
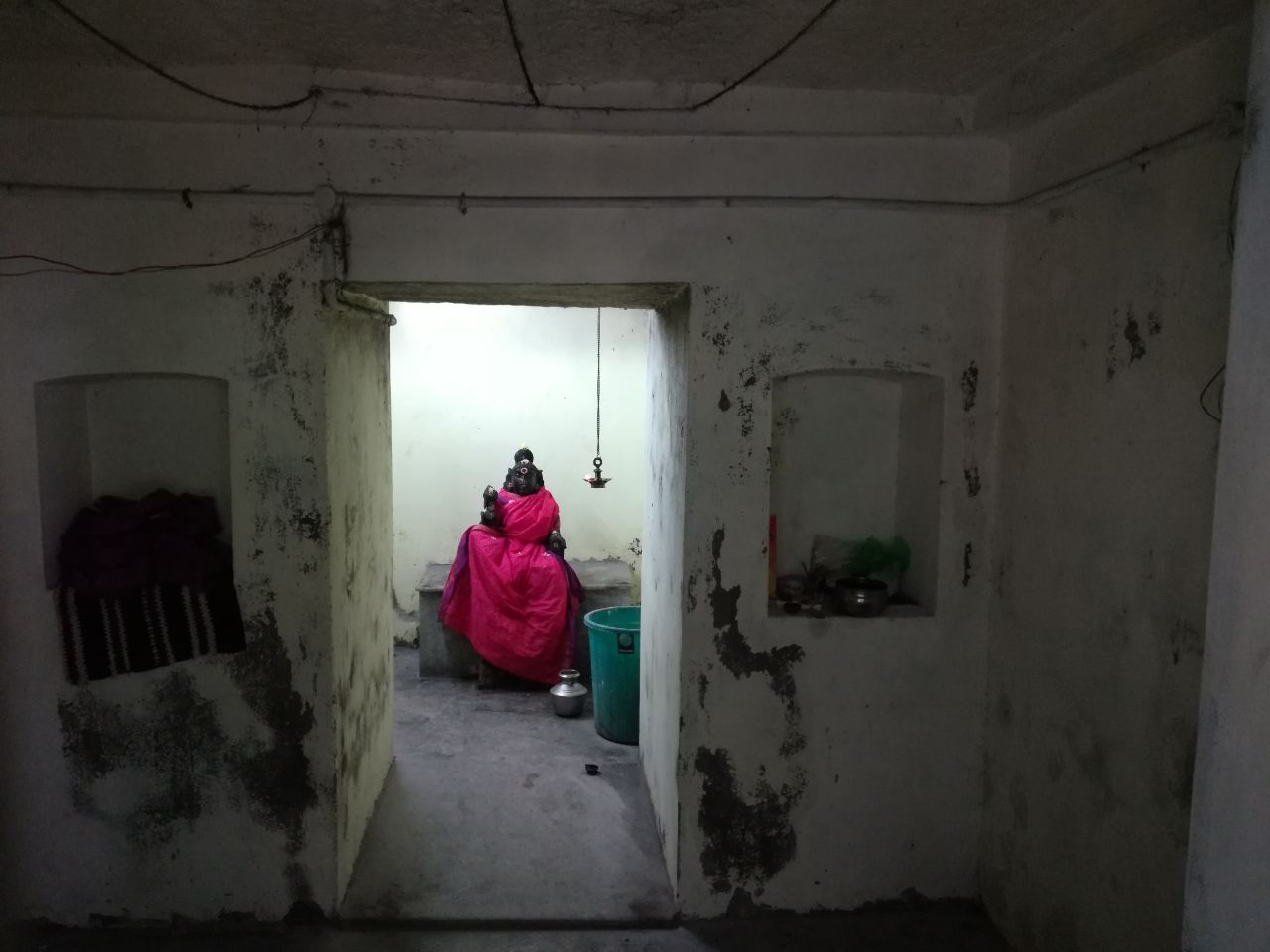
Vasuki's idol, patterned after goddess Kamakshi, within the sanctum sanctorum at the Mylapore Valluvar Temple

When Vasuki died, Valluvar cremated her body in a sitting posture. Valluvar is said to have composed an elegy at the deathbed of Vasuki soon after she died. A quatrain, the verse tells how deeply Valluvar loved his wife.

| Original அடிசிற் கினியாளே! அன்புடை யாளே! படிசொற் கடவாத பாவாய்!—அடிவருடிப் பின்தூங்கி முன்எழூஉம் பேதையே போதியோ! என்தூங்கும் என்கண் இரா. | Transliteration Adisiṟ kiniyāḷē! Anbudaiyāḷē! Padisoṟ kadavādha pāvāi!—Adivarudi; Pinthūngi muneḻum pēdhaiyē pōdhiyō! Enthūngum enkaṇ irā. | Translation (John Lazarus, 1913) O thou loving one, O sweet'ner of my food, O wife who ne'er transgressed my word, Who did'st chafe my feet, rising first and sleeping last, O when will these eyes know sleep again! |

Valluvar is by far the only known Tamil poet who has sung a verse on his or her spouse. Over the centuries, the individual phrases within the quatrain have become famed maxims on their own.

== In popular culture ==
Vasuki is praised for her faithfulness as a wife towards her husband Valluvar and is noted as a model of Tamil womanhood. She has her own sanctum at the Ekambareswarar–Kamakshi Temple, commonly known as the Valluvar temple, in the neighborhood of Mylapore in Chennai, where she is patterned after the Hindu deity Kamakshi and worshiped. Her idol, along with the idol of Valluvar, is carried in an annual procession in the Tamil month of Panguni (mid March to Mid April) during the Bramotsavam celebrations of the Kapaleeshwarar Temple. The wedding hall near the Mylapore Valluvar temple is also named after her and Valluvar as Valluvar–Vasuki Tirumana Mantapam.

== Legacy ==
Vasuki is considered the epitome and an archetypal example of a cultured Tamil woman, known for such qualities as kindness, grace, humility, and modesty. In one of her works named the Garland of Advice for Women, poet Avvai exemplifies Vasuki while giving advice to women wherein she instructs the young lady to "perform domestic duties as did the wife of Valluvar."

== See also ==
- Sangam period
- Tamil culture
- Tamilakam
- Elelasingan
