= Neeragattu Anusha =

Indian cricketer (born 1999)

Personal information
- Full name: Neeragattu Anusha
- Born: 12 August 1999 (age 27); Andhra Pradesh, India
- Batting: Right-handed
- Bowling: Right-arm medium fast
- Role: Batsman
- Source: CricArchive, 3 March 2019

Neeragattu Anusha (born 12 August 1999) is an Andhraite cricketer. She plays for Andhra Pradesh and South Zone. She has played 4 First-class, 15 List A and 14 Women's Twenty20 matches. She made her debut in major domestic cricket on 11 December 2013 in a one-day match against Baroda.
