= Mylapore =

Neighbourhood of Chennai

- Neighbourhood
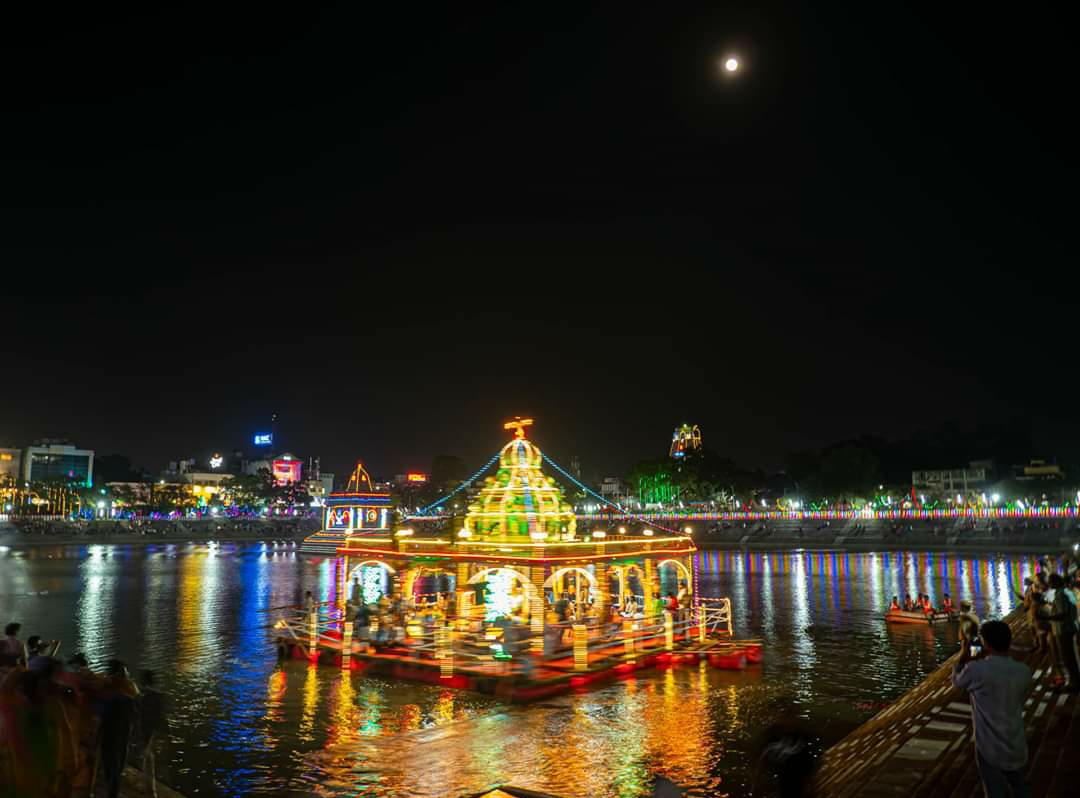

- Location within Chennai Location within Tamil Nadu Location within India
- Coordinates: 13.0368°N 80.2676°E
- Country: India
- State: Tamil Nadu
- District: Chennai District
- Metro: Chennai
- Ward: 147
- Talukas: Mylapore

Government
  - Body: CMDA
  - National representation (MP): Thamizhachi Thangapandian (DMK)
  - State representation (MLAs): P. Venkataramana Iyer (TVK)

Area
  - Total: 3.914 km^{2} (1.511 sq mi)
- Elevation: 53 m (174 ft)
- Demonym: Mylapoorans

Languages
  - Official: Tamil
- Time zone: UTC+5:30 (IST)
- PIN: 600 004
- Vehicle registration: TN-06
- Lok Sabha constituency: South Chennai
- Vidhan Sabha constituency: Mylapore
- Planning agency: CMDA
- Website: www.chennai.tn.nic.in

Mylapore (also spelt Mayilapur (Note: Mylapore is the British English spelling, and Mayilāppūr is the accurate Indian English spelling.)), or Thirumayilai, is a neighbourhood in the central part of the city of Chennai, India. It is one of the oldest residential parts of the city. The locality is claimed to be the birthplace of the celebrated Tamil philosopher Valluvar, and the Hindu saint and philosopher, Peyalvar. It is also believed by Christians to be the place of martyrdom of St. Thomas the Apostle, who preached along the Malabar Coast, and established the Malankara Nasrani community.

Mylapore is known for its tree-lined avenues, Kapaleeshwarar Temple, Katcheri seasons, and Ramakrishna Matha among many others. St. Thomas Cathedral Basilica, Chennai which is believed to house the tomb of Thomas the Apostle, is in Mylapore.

== Etymology ==
The word Mylapore is the anglicized form of the Dravidian word Mayilāppūr. It is derived from the Tamil phrase மயில் ஆர்ப்பரிக்கும் ஊர் Mayil ārpparikkum ūr, which means 'land of the peacock scream'. Historically, peacocks have been known to thrive in the area, which is evident from the several statues in the Kapaleeshwarar Temple towers and in the emblem of the San Thome Basilica. Thirugnanasambandar has also mentioned mayil (peacocks) in his songs in Tevaram. Mylapore is also known as Thirumayilai.

== History ==
Mylapore is an ancient settlement. As the available historical and archaeological evidence show, it could well be the oldest part of Chennai, with written records of early settlements going back to the first century BCE. Thiruvalluvar, the Tamil poet-philosopher, is believed to have been born here in 31 BCE. It was known for its ancient port with a flourishing trade with the Roman Empire, receiving gold in exchange for its products like pepper and fine cloth. St. Thomas the Apostle allegedly died at Mylapore in 72 CE. Marco Polo visited the place in the late 13th century and visited the tomb of Saint Thomas the Apostle was in Mylapore.

It was considerable maritime time and the ancient German and Greek maps refer to the town as 'Maliarpha'. The later Scottish researchers like James Playfair referred it "Meliapour" Mylapore was occupied by the Portuguese in 1523, who established the viceroyalty of "São Tomé de Meliapor" or "Saint Thomas of Mylapore." Portuguese rule lasted until 1749, except for a brief interregnum between 1662 and 1672 when the town was conquered first by the Sultans of Golconda, then by a French expeditionary force for two years, and up to 1687, when the town was occupied by the Dutch.

After 1749, the British East India Company took possession of the settlement in the name of Muhammad Ali Khan Wallajah, the Nawab of Arcot. In that same year, Mylapore was incorporated into the administration of the Presidency of Madras.

== Location ==
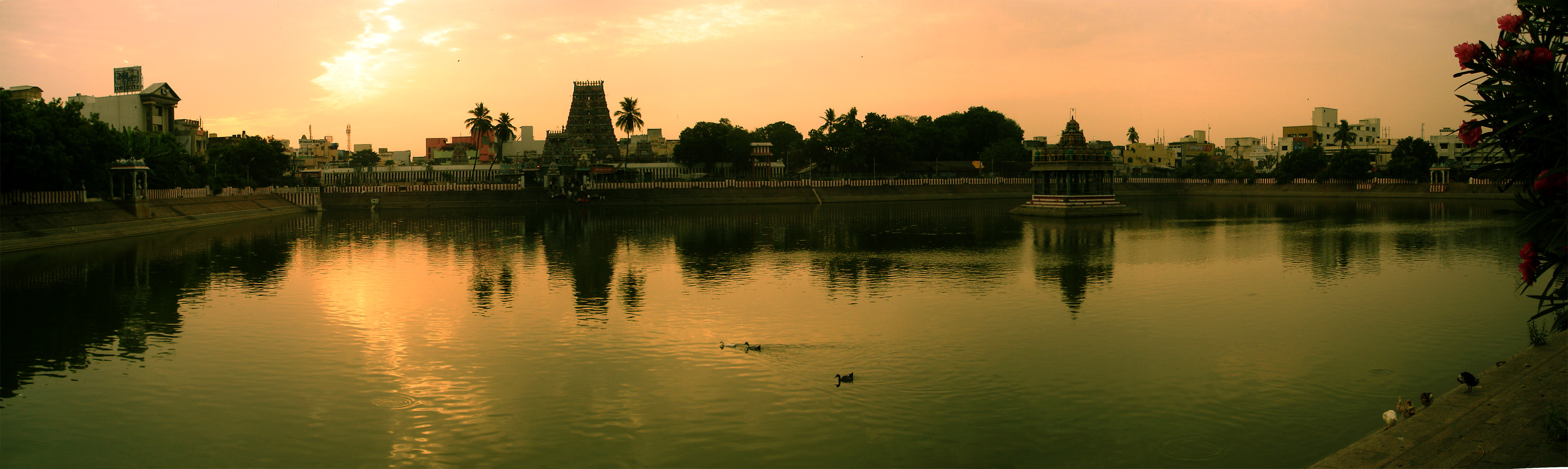
Kapaleeshwarar Temple water tank during a sunset

Mylapore is located a few kilometres to the south of the British-built Chennai city. The neighborhood is bordered by Triplicane in the north, Royapettah in the northwest, Alwarpet in the west, and Mandaveli in the south. The Bay of Bengal coast is in the east of Mylapore. It extends for around 4 km from north to south and 2 km from east to west.

== Demographics ==
The population of Mylapore was estimated in 2006 to be around 150,000 to 300,000.

== Notable people ==
- Peyalvar, one of the twelve alvar saints of South India, in held in popular tradition to have been found in the lily flower in the pond of the Adi Kesava Perumal Temple in Mylapore in 4203 BCE.
- Valluvar, the Tamil poet philosopher and the author of the Tirukkural, was born in Mylapore in 31 BCE.
- According to legends, St. Thomas the Apostle attained martyrdom at Parangimalai in south Chennai in 72 CE. San Thome Basilica is built over his original tomb in Mylapore. His relics were moved to Edessa in the third century.

== Notable places ==
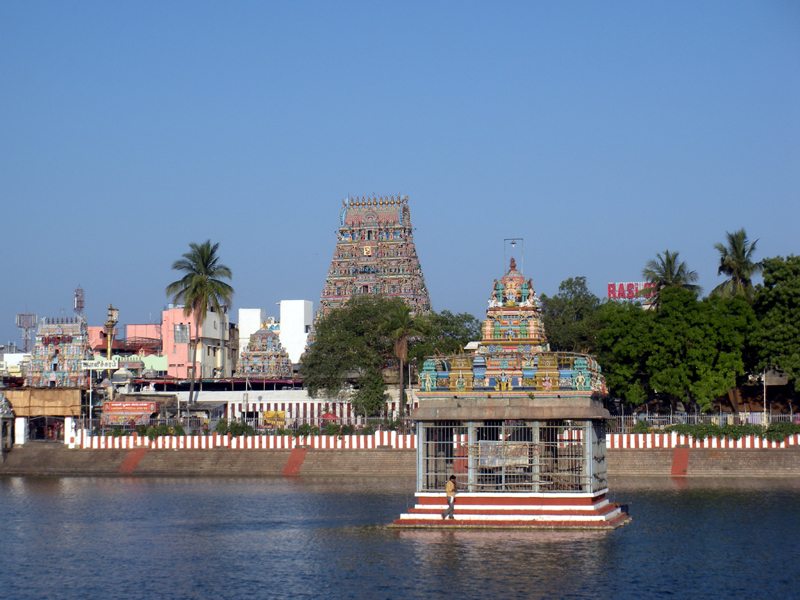
Kapaleeswarar Temple

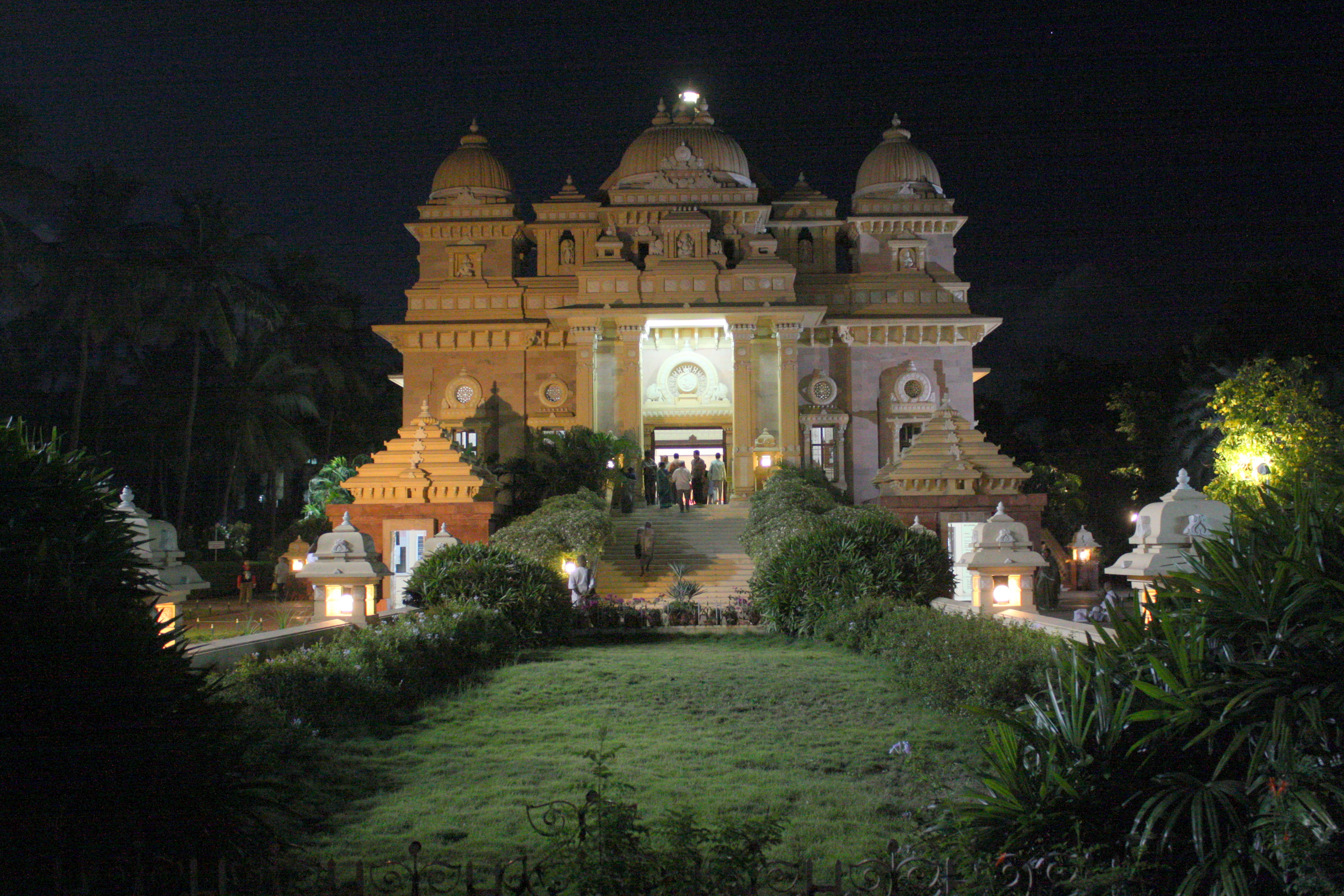
Entrance of the Universal Temple

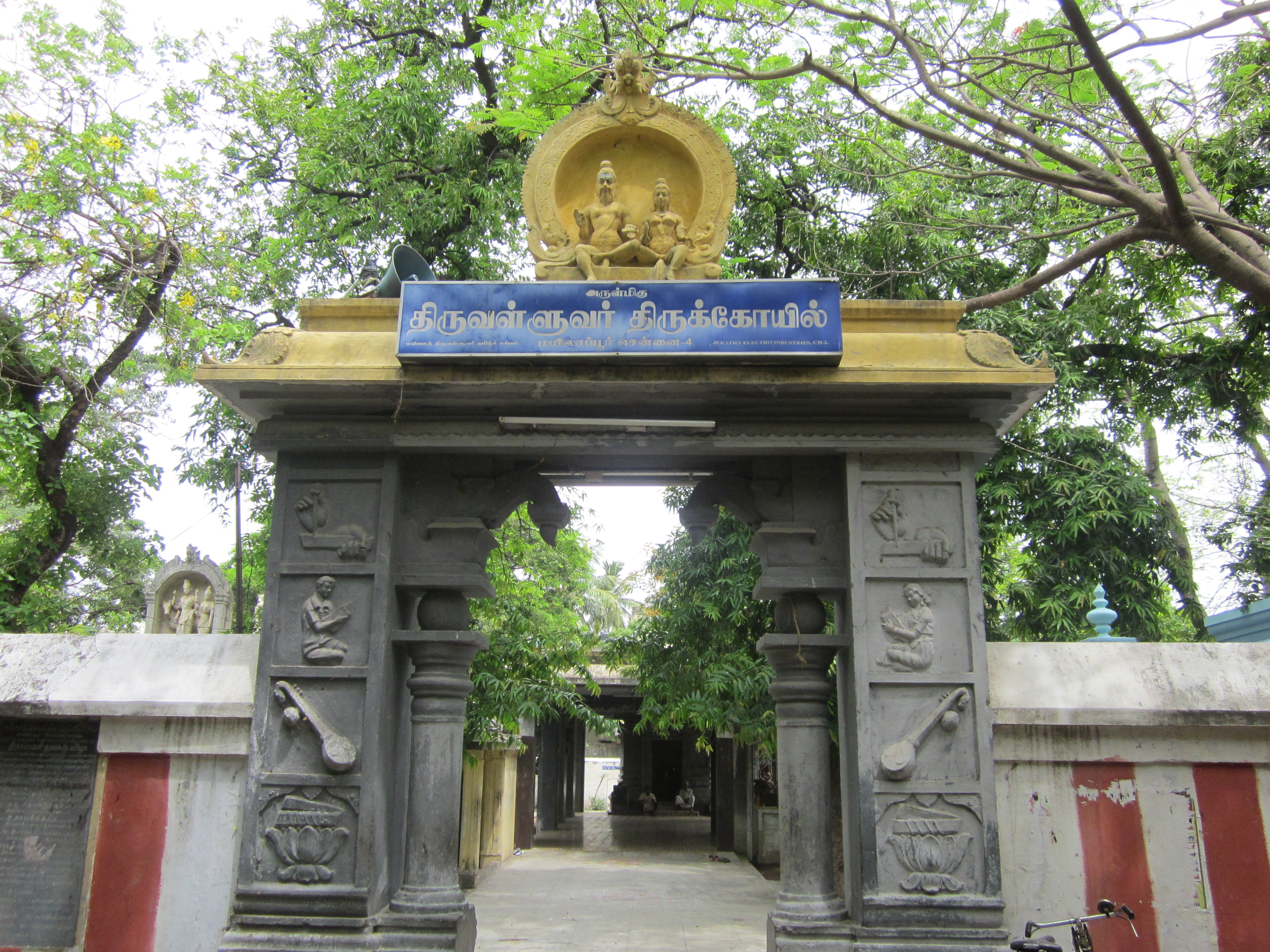
A temple for Thiruvalluvar in Mylapore

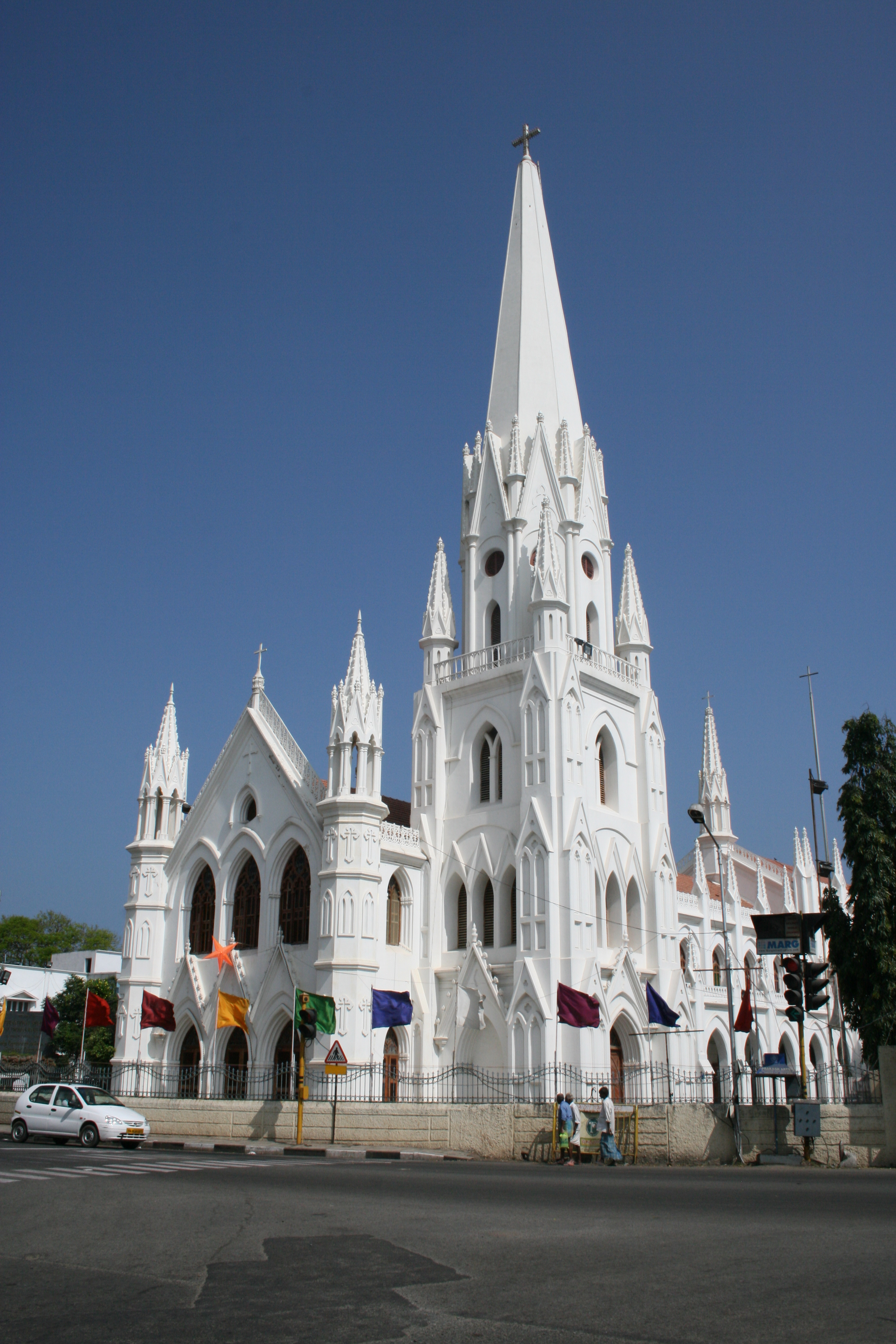
St. Thomas Cathedral Basilica, Chennai

- Kapaleeswarar Temple
- Thiruvalluvar Temple, Dates to at least the early 16th century.
- San Thome Basilica, built over the tomb of Thomas the Apostle, is a Roman Catholic minor basilica at Santhome.
- Luz Anjaneya Temple
- Madras Music Academy
- Vivekananda College
- Lighthouse, Chennai

== Culture ==
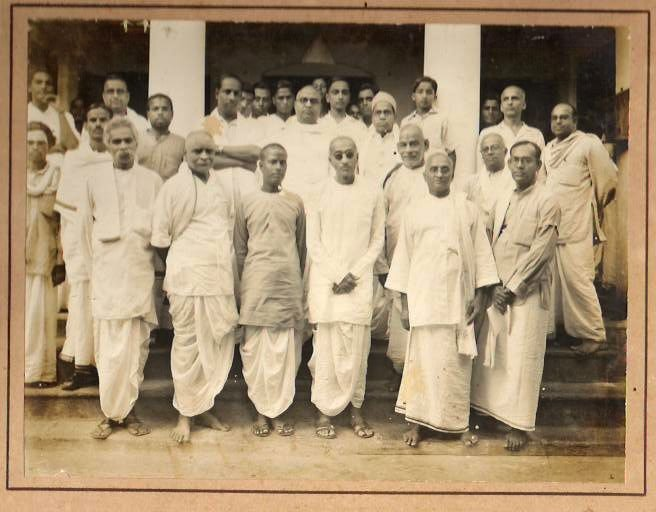
Convention of the Mylai Tamizh Sangam, early 1900s

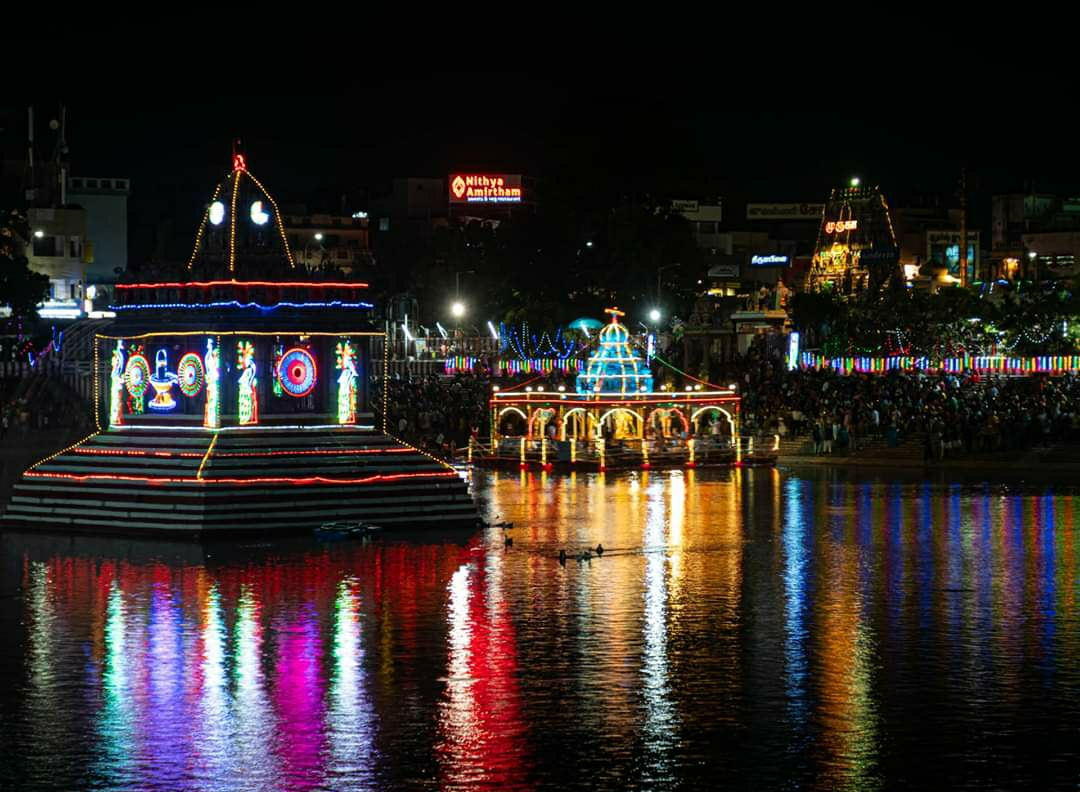
Kapaleeswarar Temple Theppam Festival

The Parthasarathy Swami Sabha in Mylapore is the oldest Sabha (Assembly) in Tamil Nadu. The Madras Music Academy in the north of the district is a location for art events in the city.

The 10-day Panguni Brahmotsavam, a series of procession events of the Kapaleeshwarar temple and related shrines around the temple during the Tamil month of Panguni (March–April), is the most important annual event of the neighbourhood. People from around the country and abroad participate in the events. The main deities of the Kapaleeshwarar temple, including Shiva, Parvathi, and Nandhi taken on a 13-meter-tall chariot, led by Vinayakar chariot and followed by the attendant pantheon of nayanmars (Shaivite saints) in a series of palanquins and other deities of the surrounding shrines including Mundagakanni Amman, Kolavizhi Amman, Vasuki with Valluvar, Draupadi Amman, Ankalaparameshwari Amman, Vairamudi Swami, and Chintadripet Muthukumaran are taken in procession. The Arubathimoovar on day eight draws the maximum crowd during which the 63 nayanmars along with the idol of philosopher-saint Valluvar as the 64th nayanmar are taken in procession. The festival is dated back to 7th century CE. Mylapore Website provides news about arts and culture of Chennai City.

== Politics ==
The Mylapore assembly constituency is part of Chennai South (Lok Sabha constituency).

== Education ==
=== Colleges ===
- Ramakrishna Mission Vivekananda College

=== CBSE affiliated Schools ===
- P. S. Senior Secondary School
- Vidya Mandir Senior Secondary School
- Sir Sivaswami Kalalaya Senior Secondary School

=== Others ===
- ICAT Design & Media College
- Mindscreen Film Institute

== Rail transit ==
Thirumayilai Railway Station, on the Mass Rapid Transit System network, connects Mylapore to Chennai Beach to the north and Velachery on the south.

== See also ==
- History of Chennai
