= Demographics of Chennai =

Religion in Chennai (2011)
1. Hinduism (80.7%)
2. Islam (9.45%)
3. Christianity (7.72%)
4. Jainism (1.11%)
5. Buddhism (0.06%)
6. Sikhism (0.06%)
7. Other religion (0.04%)
8. Not Stated (0.83%)

Chennai, along with Mumbai, Delhi and Kolkata, is one of the few Indian cities that are home to a diverse population of ethno-religious communities. According to the 2011 census Chennai then had a total population of 6,748,026 at a density of 15,840 per square kilometre spanning across an area of 426 km^{2}; the sex ratio was 1025 and literacy rate was 90.33%. The most widely spoken languages are Tamil and English. Hinduism is followed by a majority of the populace followed by Islam and Christianity. Sikhism, Jainism, Buddhism and Zoroastrianism are other religions practiced.

== History of enumeration ==
Population of Chennai city
Year	Pop.	±%
1871	397,552	—
1881	405,848	+2.1%
1891	452,518	+11.5%
1901	509,346	+12.6%
1911	518,660	+1.8%
1921	526,911	+1.6%
1931	647,232	+22.8%
1941	777,481	+20.1%
1951	1,416,056	+82.1%
1961	1,729,141	+22.1%
1971	2,469,449	+42.8%
1981	3,266,034	+32.3%
1991	3,841,396	+17.6%
2001	4,343,645	+13.1%
2011	4,681,087	+7.8%
Sources: * 1639–1791: * 1871–1901: * 1871–1931: * 1931–1951: * 1951–1961: * 1991–2001: * 2001–2011:

Based on the revenue comparisons for the years 1639 and 1648, the population of Madras in 1639, the year of its founding have been calculated as 7,000. Captain Thomas Bowrey in his 1670 book Countries around the Bay of Bengal gives one of the earliest estimates for the population of the city. According to him, Madras had a population of 30,000 including 300 Englishmen and 3,000 Portuguese. Alexander Hamilton in New Account of the East Indies and Persia (1718) wrote,

The colony is well peopled, for there is computed to be 80,000 inhabitants in the towns and villages; and there is generally about 4,500 Europeans residing there...

The idea of taking a census of Madras city was first mooted during the presidency of Elihu Yale. After being shelved for a time, the question was raised again in 1801 when the United Kingdom decided to organise an all-India census. The first census of any part of the city was taken in 1795 when the population of Blacktown (presently Georgetown) was determined as 60,000. According to an 1822 estimate, Madras had a population of 462,051 while an 1863 report by Charles Trevelyan to the Royal Sanitary Commission records that there were not less than a million people in Madras city. There have also been population estimates by other individuals, notable among them being Sir William Langhorne and Elihu Yale.While an Indian census was not organised until 1871, minor population headcounts of the city were taken by the Madras government on 4-year gaps from 1851–52 to 1866–67.

However, these early estimates and the methods used have been criticized by later enumerators. According to population scientist Christophe Guilmoto, the early enumerations were not censuses but "simple headcounts providing little information beyond the sub regional sex distribution". W. R. Cornish, who was the Madras Superintendent of the 1871 Census, the first organised census in British India, wrote

... the estimates of the population of Madras prior to 1867 have been so various and the direct Censuses of 1822 and 1863 were so evidently untrustworthy that it had long been found utterly impossible to any satisfactory conclusion as to the actual number of people living in the city

The first organized census of Madras city and its environs was undertaken in 1871 as a part of the India Census. Madras had a total population of 397,552 in 1871 making it India's third most populous city after Calcutta and Bombay.It was also the fifth largest city in the British Empire.

== Population growth ==
The first census of India taken in 1871 gave a population of 397,552. The city was acutely affected by the great famine of 1876–77, with 1877 alone accounting for 40,500, and maintained a steady growth rate throughout the last decades of the 19th century. Between 1901 and 1921, however, the population growth rate was slow. According to CMDA’s Second Master Plan, the region’s population is projected to reach approximately 14.8 million by 2026.

== Religion ==
Religions and their adherents (in percentage of total population)
Census	Hindu	Muslim	Christian	Jain	Buddhist	Sikh	Others	Not Stated
1901	80.6	11.3	8.0	0.05	0.02	0	0.02	0
1911	80.2	11.4	8.1	0	0	0	0.35	0
1921	81.2	10.1	8.4	0.2	0.1	0	0	0
1931	80.4	10.8	8.4	0.4	0.05	0	0	0
1941	79.9	12.3	5.9	0	0	0	2.31	0
1951	81.6	9.9	7.8	0.4	0.07	0.07	0.09	0
1961	85	7.5	6.9	0.5	0.02	0.04	0.07	0
1971	84.1	8.5	6.6	0.7	0.03	0.05	0.01	0
1981	84.4	8.1	6.4	0.7	0.1	0.04	0.06	0
1991	83.9	8.7	6.4	0.9	0.02	0.04	0.03	0
2001	81.3	9.4	7.6	1.1	0.04	0.06	0.23	0
2011	80.73	9.45	7.72	1.11	0.06	0.06	0.04	0.83

Hindus form the majority of Chennai's population but the city also has substantial Muslim and Christian minorities. As per the 2001 census, Hindus formed 81.3 percent of the total population while Muslims made up 9.4 percent and Christians, 7.6 percent.

=== Hinduism ===
Hinduism is the majority faith in Chennai. The temples towns of Mylapore, Triplicane, Thiruvottiyur, Saidapet and Thiruvanmiyur, which are now part of Chennai city, had been visited by the Saivite saints called Nayanars. The saint Vayilar Nayanar was born and brought up in Mylapore. Sambandar gives a physical description of Mylapore in his hymns

In Mylapore of beautiful groves,
The waves creep up to the shore and then dance on it
As do the fisherfolk who spear the many fish in the waters,
Kapaleeswaram in its plenty celebrates the Thiruvadhirai festival,
Is it done for you to miss this excitement, Poompavai?

The early dubashes or Indian merchants who worked for the British East India Company were devout Hindus. The Chennakesava Perumal Temple, considered to be the chief Hindu temple of Madraspatnam and first to be built since the founding of the city in 1640, was constructed by the dubash Beri Thimmanna in 1646. Chennai is also an important centre of the Ramakrishna Order whose oldest institution the Sri Ramakrishna Math was founded in Chennai in May 1897. Since 1882, Chennai has been the headquarters of the Theosophical Society, a spiritual organisation dedicated to the study of world religions and inter-faith dialogue. According to a 1981 estimate, there were about 600 Hindu temples in Chennai city. The important among them are the Chennakesava Perumal Temple, Chenna Mallesvarar Temple Kapaleeswarar Temple, Parthasarathy Temple, Vadapalani Andavar Temple, Ashtalakshmi Kovil, Kalikambal Temple and the Thiruvalluvar Temple.

=== Islam ===
There has been a recorded presence of Muslims in Chennai from the 9th century CE onwards. The oldest known mosques in Madras - the ones at Pulicat and Kovalam were built in the 10th century CE. Both Marco Polo in the 13th century and Duarte Barbosa in the 16th century record that St. Thomas was venerated by Christians as well as Muslims of Madras.

=== Christianity ===
The city also has one of the highest population of Christians among major Indian cities, accounting for 7.6% of the city's population.

== Languages ==
Census	Mother-tongues of Chennai (as percentage of the total population)									
Census	Tamil	Telugu	Urdu	Hindi	Malayalam	Gujarati	Kannada	Marathi	English	Other
1901	61.2	21.3	10.1	0.1	0.2	0.3	0.4	1.2	3.1	0.71
1911	62.3	20.7	10.3	0	0.3	0.5	0.6	1.3	2.9	1.03
1921	63.9	19.8	8.8	0	0.8	0.6	0.6	1.3	2.7	1.59
1931	63.6	19.3	9.7	0.4	1.4	0.5	0.7	1.2	2.1	1.1
1941	NA	NA	NA	NA	NA	NA	NA	NA	NA	NA
1951	67.9	19.3	6.3	1.6	2.8	0.6	1.1	0.8	1.3	1.1
1961	70.9	14.1	5.9	0.9	3.3	0.7	0.9	0.8	1.0	1.33
1971	73.7	12.0	5.7	1.3	3.7	0.8	0.7	0.7	0.6	0.68
1981	74.5	12.0	5.2	1.6	3.2	0.7	0.7	0.6	0.5	1.24
1991	76.7	10.5	4.8	2.1	3.2	0.7	0.6	0.5	0.3	0.58
2001	78.8	9.7	4.1	2.4	2.6	0.6	0.5	0.4	0.3	0.5
2011	80.0	9.3	4.2	2.7	2.2		NA	NA	NA	0.6
Source: Census of India

Tamil is the most common language, being the mother tongue of about 78.3% of Chennai inhabitants. English is commonly used as a second language by white-collar workers.

In 1891, the percentage of people who spoke Tamil was 60.4%, followed by Telugu at 22.25%. Since then, the usage of Telugu in Chennai has dropped significantly, especially in the second half of the 1900s. This decrease has been attributed to the mass migration of Telugu-speakers from the city upon the formation of Andhra State in 1953. The decrease in the proportion of people who spoke English as their mother tongue has been attributed to the departure of most Europeans and Anglo-Indians for the United Kingdom following India's independence in 1947. Only a handful of Hindi speakers appear to have lived in Chennai in 1901 and they did not have a notable presence till the inauguration of the Republic of India in 1950. However, since 1950, their numbers have increased rapidly.

== Ethnicities ==
=== Jains ===
There are both North-Indian and Tamil Jains in the city, although the former outnumber the latter. There are about 100 Jain temples in the city built by the North Indian Jains, whereas there are only 18 Tamil Jain temples catering to roughly 1,500 Tamil Jain families.

=== Sikhs ===
There is no known official record of the first arrival of Sikhs in the city. However, it is believed that the migration has been consistent before, during, and post partition of India. As of 2012, there were about 300 Sikh families residing in the city. Sri Guru Nanak Sat Sangh Sabha, established in 1949, is a centre for social, religious and spiritual activities and is a common point for the Sikh families in the city to converge during special occasions and festivals.

=== Zoroastrians ===
The first Parsis came to Madras in 1809 from Coorg when the ruling King's brother sent a deputation to the Governor of Fort St. George to deliver a picture. Hirijibhai Maneckji Kharas was the first Parsi to land in the city, who was accompanied by five other Parsis and two priests who bought land at Royapuram opposite the Catholic Church. By the 1900s, the Parsis were generally a prosperous lot, dealing in cars, cycles, perfumes and dyes. The first Iranis came to Madras around 1900 and soon became known for their Irani cafes and also established or managed theatres. There was no official priest in the community for over 100 years till 1906. There was no place of worship till the Royapuram fire temple was built in 1909.

As of 2010, there were about 250 Parsis in Chennai. Many of them live in Royapuram.

=== Japanese ===
As of 2013, there were about 700 Japanese in the city.

=== Koreans ===
Chennai is the earliest hub of the Korean community in India, owing to Hyundai's decision to open factories in the city in 1995. Koreans concentrated largely in the Kilpauk township, which has acquired the nickname of "Little Korea" as a result. The Korean community in the city continued to grow in the following years, and by 2009, there were about 3,000 Koreans in the city, up from about 700 in 2006. Since then, Koreans make up the largest number of expatriates in Chennai. As of 2013, there are over 4,000 Koreans in the city. According to the Korea Trade Centre, the city has over 150 Korean companies, including Hyundai Motors, Samsung, LG, and Lotte. Several small and medium enterprises, mainly automobile spare parts, logistics and engineering companies, such as Hwashin, Dong-Sung and Doowon, have their operations to support these large firms.

Many Koreans in Chennai work for Hyundai Motors and its suppliers. Some expatriates have also opened Korean restaurants, aimed largely at their co-ethnics rather than local Indians. Koreans have also formed a number of Christian churches in India, including two in Chennai; others include two in New Delhi and one in Mumbai.

=== Nepalis ===
Around 5-6 lakh Nepali speaking people live in Chennai since a long time, half of them are Indian originated from various parts of North East and Darjeeling, Kalimpong and Duars part of West Bengal and also from Sikkim, rest are from Nepal, the Nepali speaking people are engaged in various professions like beauty and salon, hotel and services, guard for houses and also in IT and teachings.

== See also ==
- Religion in Chennai
