= Apparswami Temple =

Coordinates: 13.040278°N 80.267473°E

Religion
- Affiliation: Hinduism
- District: Chennai
- Deity: Saint Apparswami

Location
- Location: Chennai
- State: Tamil Nadu
- Country: India

Apparswami Temple is a Hindu temple built in honour of Apparswami, a 19th-century Saivite saint. The temple, situated on Royapettah High Road, Chennai, Tamil Nadu, India, is built around his tomb over which a shivalinga was set up by his chief devotee Chidambaraswamy.

== See also ==
- Religion in Chennai
