= Bakthavatsala Perumal Temple =

Bakthavatsala Perumal Temple may refer to:

- Bhaktavatsala Perumal Temple, Thirunindravur, a temple in Thirunindravur, Tiruvallur District, Tamil Nadu, India
- Bhaktavatsala Perumal Temple, Tirukannamangai, a temple in Tirukannamangai, Nagapattinam district, Tamil Nadu, India
