= Angala Parameswari Temple, Royapuram =

Religion
- Affiliation: Hinduism
- District: Chennai
- Deity: goddess Angala Parameswari

Location
- Location: Chennai
- State: Tamil Nadu
- Country: India

Angala Parameswari Temple is a Hindu temple located in Royapuram in the northern part of Chennai, India. The presiding deity is the goddess Angala Parameswari. There are shrines to Kasi Viswanatha, Visalakshi, Vinayaka, Bhairava, Navagrahas, Durga, etc. The temple is administered by the Ministry of Hindu Religious and Charitable Endowments, Government of Tamil Nadu. The temple is one of the five holy shrines of the Viswakarma community in Chennai district.

== See also ==
- Religion in Chennai
