= Sri Guru Nanak Sat Sangh Sabha Gurudwara, Chennai =

Sikh gurudwara in Chennai, India

T. Nagar Gurudwara
- Sri Guru Nanak Sat Sangh Sabha Gurudwara

Religion
- Affiliation: Sikhism

Location
- Location: T. Nagar, Chennai
- State: Tamil Nadu
- Country: India

Architecture
- Groundbreaking: 1949
- Completed: 1952

Sri Guru Nanak Sat Sangh Sabha Gurudwara is a Sikh gurudwara in Chennai, India. Located in the neighbourhood of T. Nagar, it is a non-historical holy place for the Sikh community in the city.

== History ==
The Punjabi families who settled down in the city in early days formed a congregation and the Punjab Association was founded in 1937. The decision to build a gurudwara was made when the Sri Guru Nanak Sat Sangh Sabha was founded in 1949 by Lieutenant-Colonel Gurdial Singh Gill (1893–1982), a former director general of prisons. The construction work began in 1952, with Gill personally supervising the construction. The initial patron was Maharani Vidyawati Devi Sahib of Vizianagaram, a princess who hailed from Keonthal near Shimla and married into a princely Andhra family.

== Worship and activities ==
The gurudwara is located on G. N. Chetty Road. Important gatherings at the gurudwara include the birth anniversaries of Guru Nanak, Guru Gobind Singh and Guru Arjun Dev. Baisakhi, the Sikh new year, is another important festival at the gurudwara. The gurudwara also runs the "Guru ka Langar", a free langar or community kitchen. Prayers meetings, wherein teachings from the Guru Granth Sahib are read, are held in the morning and evening, with regular poojas and kirthans. A free medical centre also functions at the Gurudwara, offering free medical care for the poor.

The Gurudwara experiences a footfall of about 7,000 people on festival days.

During the 2020 COVID-19 pandemic, the langar at the gurudwara served food to 400 migrant workers every day.

== See also ==
- Religion in Chennai
