= Bhaktavatsala Perumal Temple, Thirunindravur =

Perumal temple in Tiruvallur district, Tamil Nadu, India

Bhaktavatsala Perumal Temple
- Bhaktavatsala Perumal Kovil
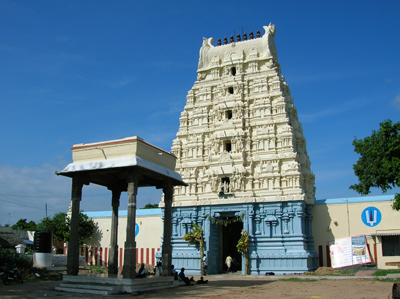

- Location in Tamil Nadu

Religion
- Affiliation: Hinduism
- District: Thiruvallur
- Deity: Bhaktavatsala (Vishnu)

Location
- Location: Thirunindravur, Chennai
- State: Tamil Nadu
- Country: India
- Coordinates: 13°6′45″N 80°1′34″E

Architecture
- Type: Dravidian architecture
- Creator: Pallavas
- Completed: 6th Century CE

Bhaktavatsala Perumal temple is a Hindu temple at Thirunindravur, a western suburb of Chennai, India. It is dedicated to the Hindu deity Vishnu. Constructed in the Dravidian style of architecture, the temple is mentioned in the Naalayira Divya Prabandham, the early medieval Tamil canon of the Alvar saints from the 6th–9th centuries CE. It is one of the 108 Divya Desams dedicated to Vishnu, who is worshipped as Bhaktavatsala Perumal and his consort Lakshmi as Ennai Petra Thayar.

The temple is believed to have been built by the Pallavas of the late 8th century CE, with later contributions from the Medieval Cholas and Vijayanagara kings. A granite wall surrounds the temple, enclosing all the shrines and two bodies of water. There is a four-tiered rajagopuram, the temple's gateway tower, in the temple.

The temple is maintained and administered by the Hindu Religious and Endowment Board of the Government of Tamil Nadu.

== Legend ==
According to the temple's Sthala Purana, Bhaktavatsala Perumal is believed to have appeared to Kubera. According to another legend, Varuna, the god of the waters, had worshipped Vishnu at this place. It is also said that Vishnu, returning from this place and accompanied by Lakshmi, stayed here, which is why the town it is called Thirunindravur. It is also that Thirumangai Alvar did not sing any pasurams (hymns) here, and followed by Vishnu, followed Thirukadalmallai and sang a hymn, praising the deity Bhaktavatsala Perumal. Lakshmi requested Perumal to appear before the Alvar, but when he did so, Thirumangai Alvar had already reached Thirukannamangai. The deity once again appeared in the dreams of the Alvar, who perceived viewing Bhaktavatsala in Tirukkannamangai.

== Religious importance ==
The temple is mentioned in the Naalayira Divya Prabandham, the 7th–9th century work by Thirumangai alvar. It is classified as a Divya Desam, one of the 108 Vishnu temples in the book.

== See also ==
- Religion in Chennai
- Heritage structures in Chennai
