= Vadapalani Andavar Temple =

Vadapalani Aandavar Temple
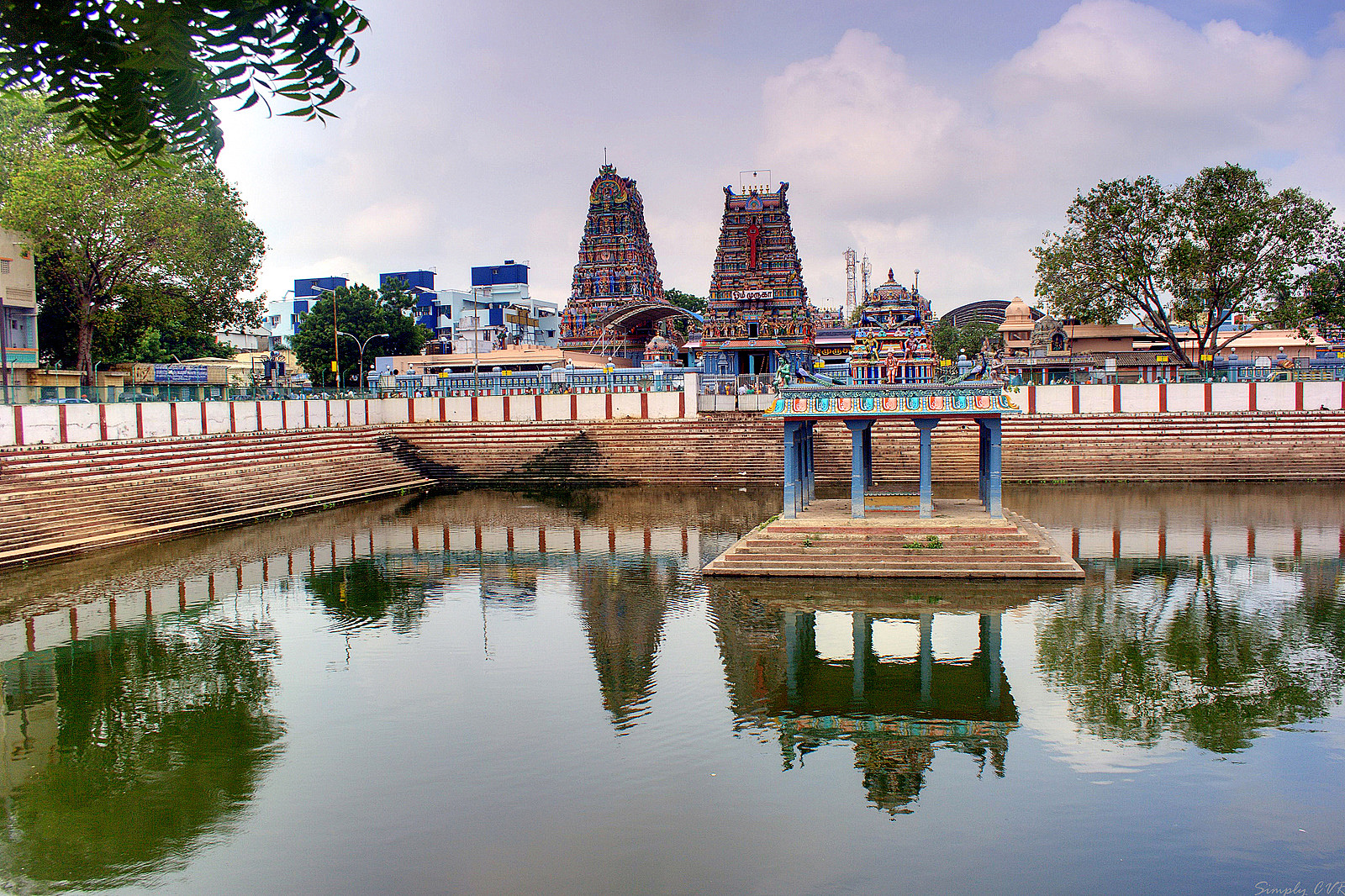

- Location in Chennai

Religion
- Affiliation: Hinduism
- District: Chennai
- Deity: Vadapalani Aandavar (Lord Muruga)

Location
- Location: Vadapalani
- State: Tamil Nadu
- Country: India
- Interactive map of Vadapalani Aandavar Temple
- Coordinates: 13°03′10″N 80°12′49″E

Architecture
- Type: Dravidian architecture
- Completed: 1865
- Elevation: 55 m (180 ft)

Vadapalani Andavar Temple is a Hindu temple dedicated to Lord Muruga. It is located in Vadapalani, Chennai, Tamil Nadu, India. It was renovated in the 1920s and a Rajagopuram was built during that time. The temple has grown in popularity, which is believed to be in part due to the patronage of cinema stars.

== History ==
The temple started initially as a thatched hut where Murugan's ardent devotee Annaswami Nayakar kept a portrait of the God and worshipped him. The temple was built on the same site as the thatched hut around 1890. He was the founder and the first priest of the temple. The Vadapalani temple became famous because of the Arul Vaakku and the ability to foretell events, as Annaswami Nayakar's words carried the truth. The devotees believed his sacred words gave effective solutions to problems, including education, failure in examinations, marriage issues, ailments, and unemployment, among others. The disciple of Annaswami Nayakar, Rathinasamy Chettiyar continued the tradition and had the same divine energy and ability as Arul Vaakku. The temple underwent renovation in 1920, and over the past century, devotees throng the temple in huge numbers.

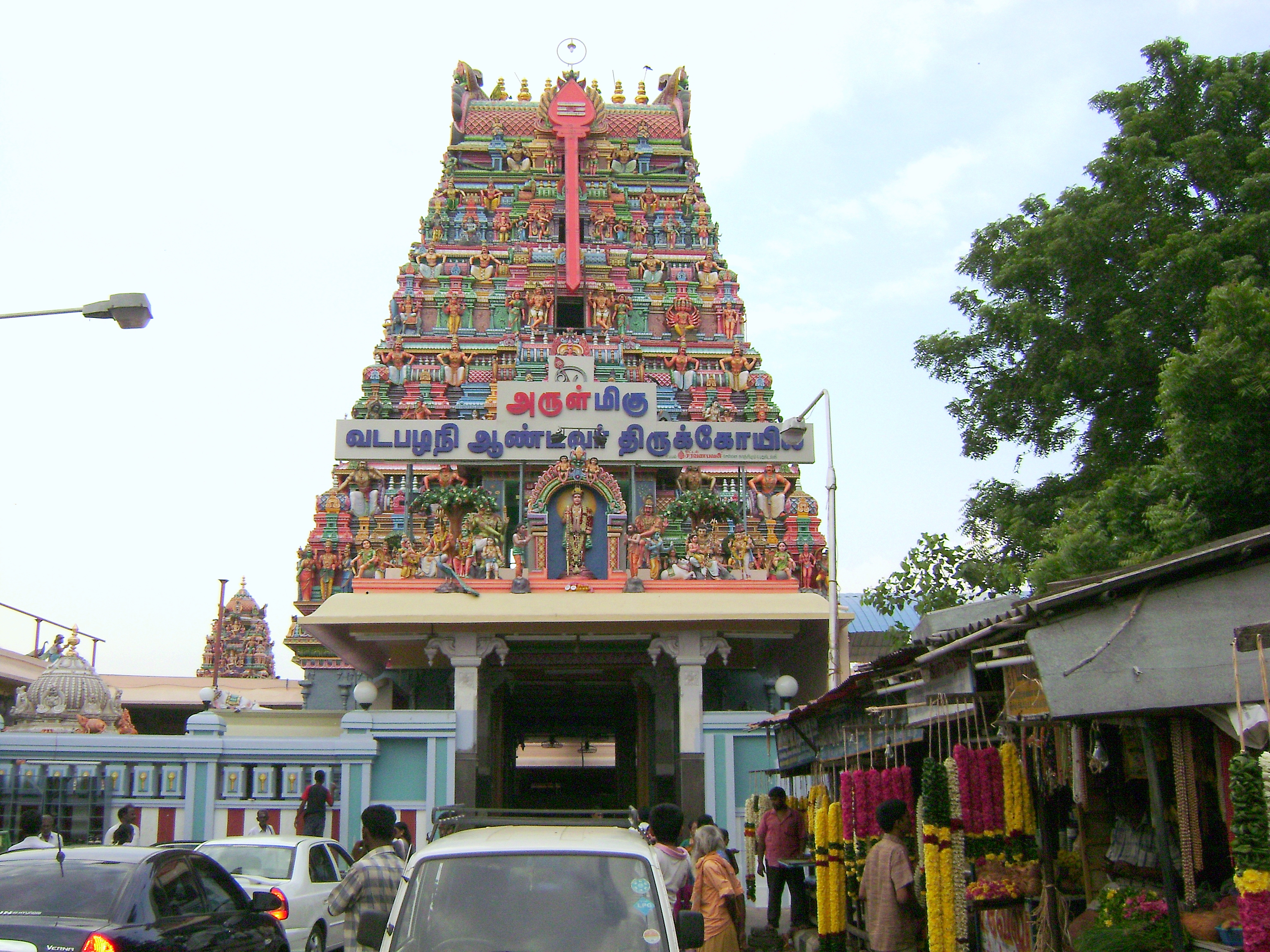
Main Entrance to the Temple from the Inner Ring Road

The temple was built in the late 19th century by an ardent devotee of Murugan, Annaswami Nayakar. He was a staunch devotee of Murugan and had built a small, thatched hut in which he placed a painted portrait of Murugan and started worshipping him. Although he suffered from an acute stomach- ailment, he went on a pilgrimage visiting all Murugan temples, braving bad weather, and thieves. One day, a Sadhu (sage) appeared in his dream and said Murugan was right in his home for worship. Annaswami Nayakar started offering poojas to Murugan, and on the word of a Palani Sadhu, he offered his tongue at the Thiruttani shrine of Murugan. His ailments disappeared.

One day he fulfilled his dream of visiting the southern Palani temple, and after Darshan (sacred view) of God, he was coming down the steps, when a beautiful picture of Murugan attracted his attention. He didn't have money to buy the picture. Next day, The shop keeper brought the picture to annaswami telling murugan came in his dream and asked to offer the painting. Annaswami bought this precious possession to his home in Chennai and asked the family to shift home elsewhere. Meanwhile, he experienced a divine power within him that started speaking truths (Arul Vaakku) and resolving problems of other devotees during pooja. His successor Rathinasamy Chettiyar agreed to Nayakar's wish to build a temple on the site.

Annaswami Nayakar oversaw the construction of the temple, while Rathinasamy Chettiyar arranged for making the sacred idol of Palaniandavar. They initiated the building of the temple in 1865. One day, Annaswami Nayakar attained spiritual abode and later came in the dream of Rathinasamy Chettiyar, asking him to take over his position. The disciple continued the tradition of resolving problems of devotees in a frenzied trance. The temple construction was completed. The sacred idol of Palaniandavar was installed, and the Kumbabishekam was performed. Offerings of devotees were used for poojas and the temple proceedings.

Rathinasamy Chettiyar asked devotees to call the temple Vadapalani Temple. He later attained spiritual abode, and the good work was continued by Bagyalingam, an ardent follower of Murugan. He continued the Arul Vaakku and the poojas.

== Architecture of Vadapalani Murugan Temple ==
The temple is built on the traditional lines of south Indian temples. The Rajagopuram at the entrance has several stuccos with the legends of the Skanda Purana depicted on them. The Moolavar (main deity) resembles the Palani temple idol and is in standing position.

The temple courtyard houses several Sannidhis including that of Varasiddhi Vinayaka, Chokkanathar, Meenakshi Amman, Kali, Bhairava, Shanmuga with Valli and Deivanai. In the inner Praharam one can see the niches of Dakshinamurthy, Chandikeshwar, and Mahalakshmi, among others. There is a separate shrine for Angaaran (Mars), whose ruling deity is Murugan.

There is an eastern tower depicted with 108 Bharatnatyam dance gestures. The tower stands 40.8 meters tall. The temple has a spacious hall where marriages are conducted, and religious discourses take place.

There is a golden chariot built for Murugan. The temple tank is in front of the temple. The Thala Vriksham is a fig tree around which devotees tie small swings for progeny.

== Significance of Vadapalani Murugan Temple ==
The belief is very strong here that people who cannot undertake the pilgrimage to the Palani temple can visit the Vadapalani temple with their offerings. Palaniandavar showers devotees with his blessings just the same as in Southern Palani. His grace resolves all issues for devotees, and they believe in the power of this sacred temple.

Only in this temple, one can see Murugan wearing footwear, a symbol that denotes shedding of arrogance. He is seen in a standing pose with his left foot forward to indicate he is in a rush to help his devotees.

Devotees offer silver and gold as offerings. Some spear their tongues, tonsure their heads, pierce their ears, and offer sarees. They take the Paalkavadi and Pushpakavadi as a special prayer. The temple is famous for helping devotees find answers to their problems in life. The temple witnesses around 7,000 marriages annually as it is considered an auspicious place for marriage.

== Miscellaneous ==
The temple is maintained and administered by the Hindu Religious and Charitable Endowments Department of the Government of Tamil Nadu.

== See also ==
- Religion in Chennai
