= Kapaleeshwarar Temple =

Hindu temple in Tamil Nadu, India

Kapaleeshwara Temple
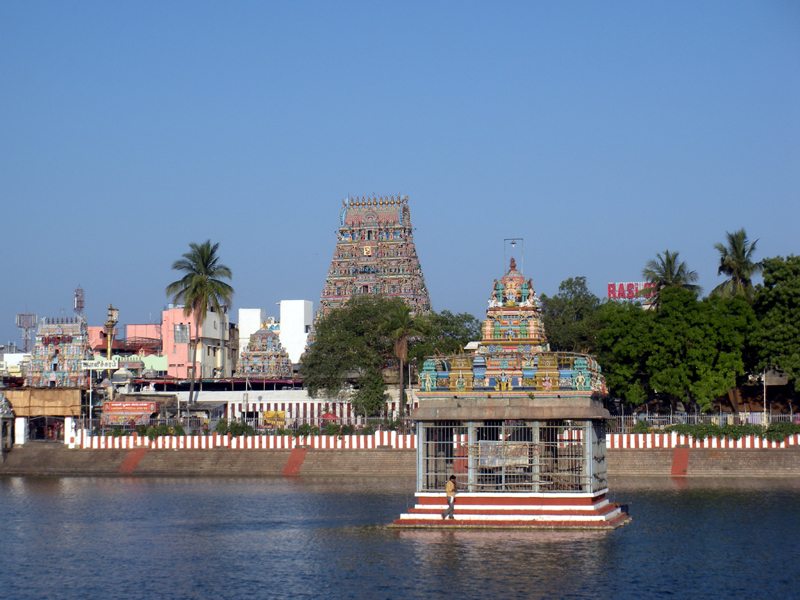

- Kapaleeshwara Temple, Mylapore, Chennai, Tamil Nadu

Religion
- Affiliation: Hinduism
- District: Chennai
- Deity: Kapaleeshwarar (Shiva), Karpagambal (Parvati)

Location
- Location: Mylapore
- State: Tamil Nadu
- Country: India
- Interactive map of Kapaleeshwara Temple
- Coordinates: 13.0337°N 80.2699°E

Architecture
- Type: Dravidian architecture
- Elevation: 54 m (177 ft)

The Kapaleeshwarar Temple is a Hindu temple dedicated to the god Shiva. It is located in Mylapore, Chennai in the Indian state of Tamil Nadu. The temple was built around the 17th century A.D. and is an example of South Indian Architecture.

According to the Puranas, Parvati worshipped her husband Shiva in the form of a peahen (mayil in Tamil), giving the vernacular name Mylai (Mayilāi) to the area that developed around the temple. Shiva is worshiped as Kapaleeshwarar, and is represented by the lingam. Parvati is worshipped as Karpagambal (goddess of the wish-yielding tree). The presiding deity is revered in the 7th-century Tamil Shaiva canonical work, the Tevaram, written by Tamil saint poets known as the Nayanars and classified as one of the Paadal Petra Sthalam.

The temple is maintained and administered by the Hindu Religious and Charitable Endowments Department of the Government of Tamil Nadu.

== Legend ==
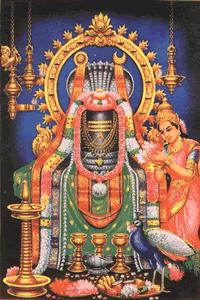
Image of Karpagambal and Kapaleeshwarar

The temple's name is derived from the words kapala (head) and Ishvara, an epithet of Shiva. According to the Puranas, during the meeting of the deities Brahma and Shiva at top of Mount Kailash, Brahma failed to show the due respect to Shiva. Due to this, Shiva plucked off one of the five heads (kapala) of Brahma. In an act of penance, Brahma came down to the site of Mylapore and installed a lingam to please Shiva. This place is known as Sukra Puri, Veda Puri, among many other names including "Kailaye Mayilai" and "Mayilaye Kayilai" (lit. 'Mylapore is Kailash'). According to regional legend, Shiva's consort Parvati (Karpagambal), due to a curse became a pea-hen and did penance here to get back her original form. Her son Murugan received the spear (vel) for the destruction of a demon from Parvati here. Brahma had worshipped here to get rid of his ego and get back his power to create. The four Vedas have worshipped here. Shukra worshipped Shiva here and got back his lost eye. The daughter of Sivanesa Chettiar Angam Poompavai, who died due to snake bite, was resurrected here by the powers of the Nayanar saint Sambandar. Vayilar, another Nayanar saint, attained salvation here.

== History ==
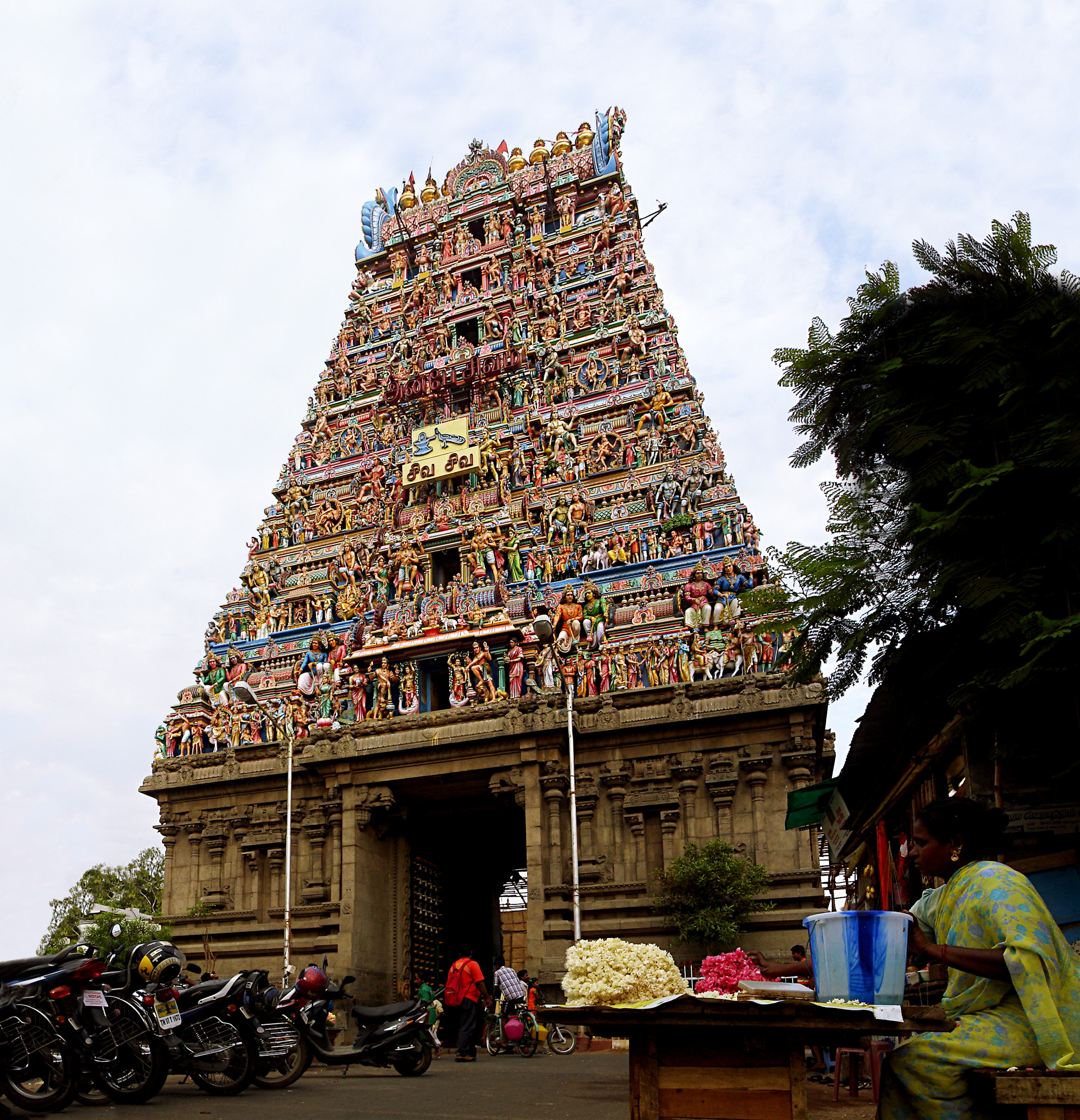
Facade of the temple

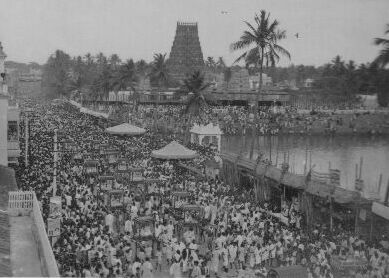
The temple festival in c. 1940

The original temple was thought to be built along the seashore in the 7th century CE by the ruling Pallavas. This view is based on references to the temple in the hymns of the Nayanar saints. However, the Nayanar Sambandar and the saint Arunagirinathar make clear reference to the Kapaleeshwarar temple being located by a seashore. There are inscriptions dating back to 12th century inside the temple. After relocation in the 17th century, the temple's 120 ft gopuram (gateway tower) was built during 1906 with stucco figures adorning it. The temple is maintained and administered by the Hindu Religious and Endowment Board of the Government of Tamil Nadu.

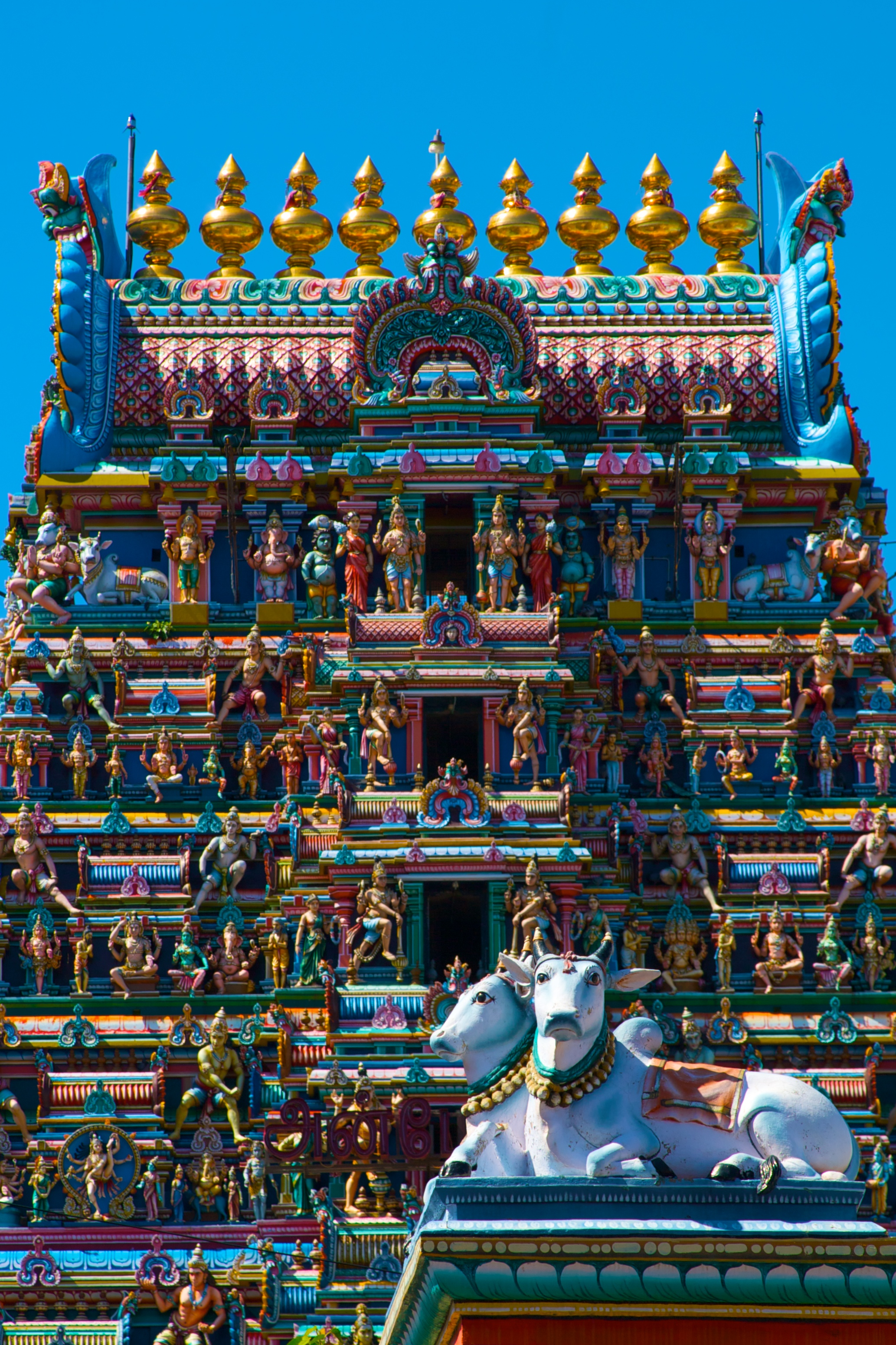
Bulls depicted in the decorated gopuram of the Kapaleeshwarar Temple.

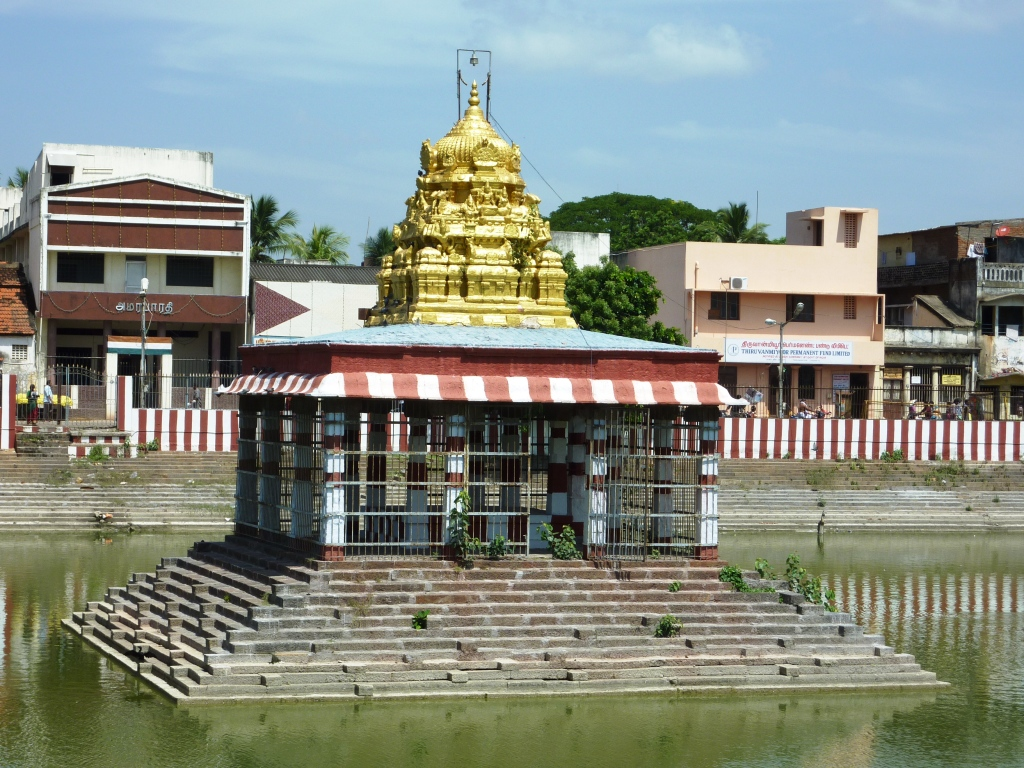
Kapaleeshwarar Temple. Chennai. 2010

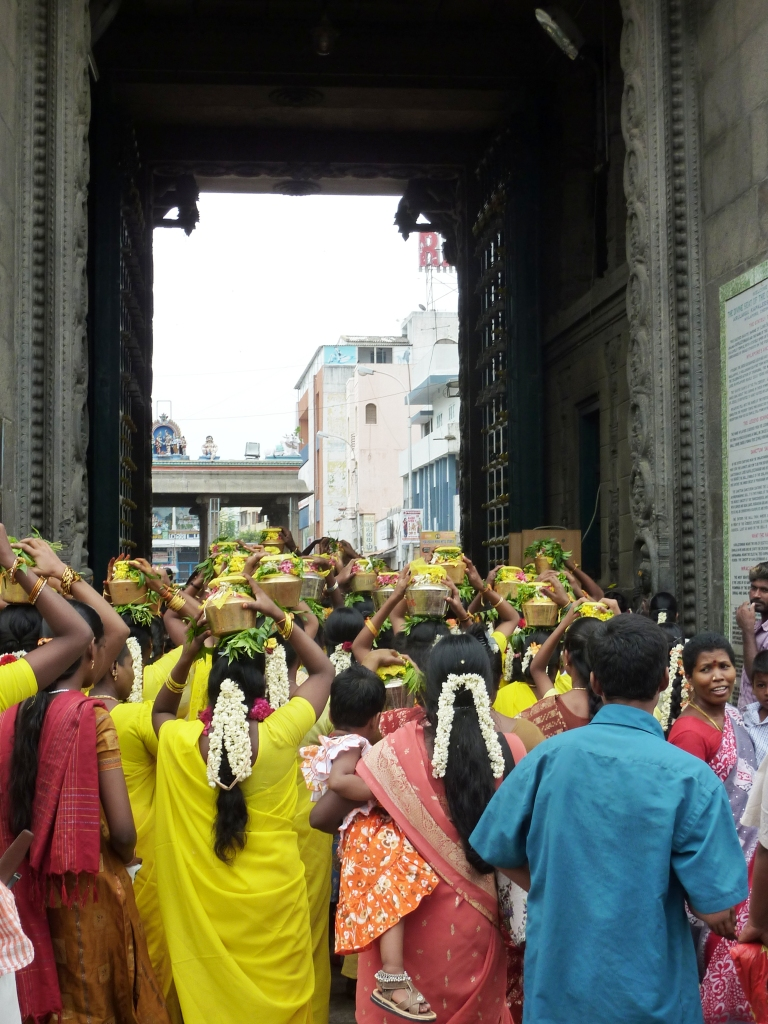
Pilgrims taking offerings to festival from Kapaleeshwarar Temple, Chennai. 2010

It is one of the Sapta Sthana Shiva temples in Mylapore area. (one of the seven sacred Shiva temples in Mylapore).

== The tank ==
The theppakulam or the temple tank lies to the west of the temple. Known as the Kapaleeshwarar Tank or the Mylapore Tank, it is one of the oldest and well-maintained theppakulams in the city, measuring about 190 m in length and 143 m in breadth. The tank has a storage capacity of 119,000 cubic metre and has water all through the year. The 16-pillared, granite-roofed structure, known as the mandapam at the centre of this tank is known for its significance during the three-day annual float festival, when idols of Kapaleeshwarar and other deities are taken around the tank to the chanting of Vedic hymns.

In 2014, ₹ 56.5 million was allotted to build a 2,150-meter-long pavement around the tank.

== Festivals ==
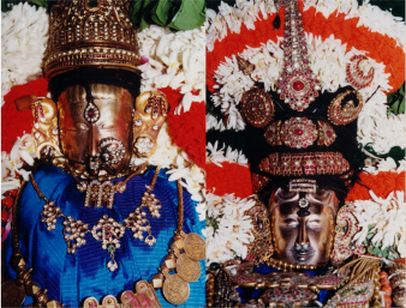
Murtis of Karpagambal and Kapaleeshwarar

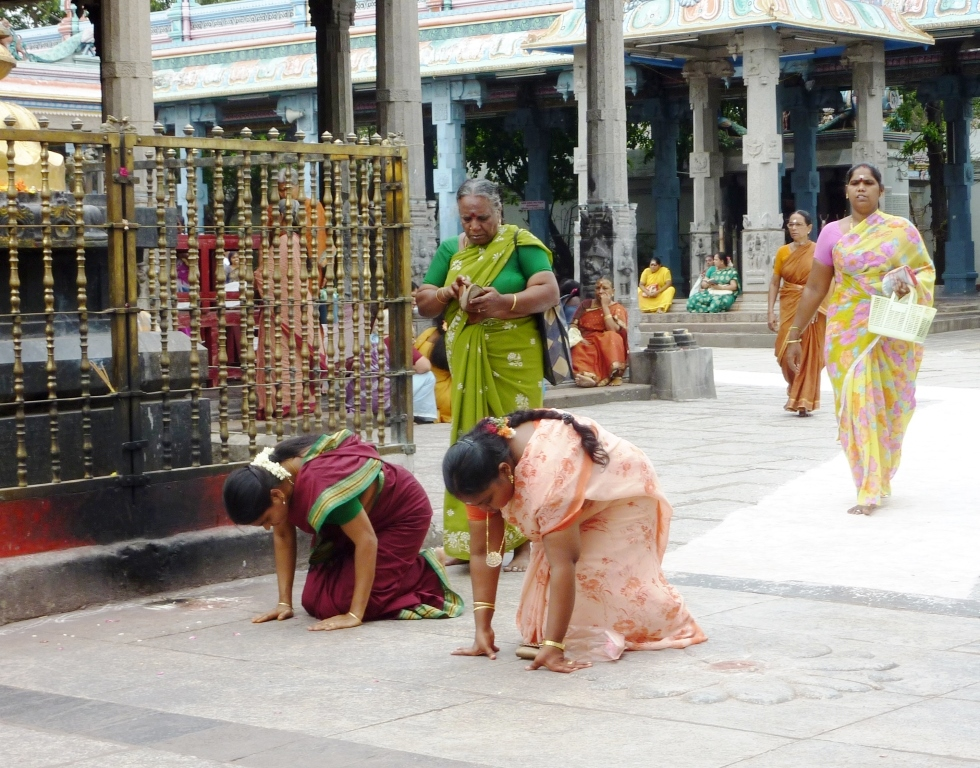
People praying at the temple in 2010

The Arupathimoovar festival is the most important procession. It is named after the sixty-three Nayanar saints. All sixty-three Nayanar idols follow the Kapaleeshwarar idol on this procession. During the car festival, Kapaleeshwarar is depicted holding a bow while seated on a throne, with Karpagambal alongside.

== Religious work and saints ==
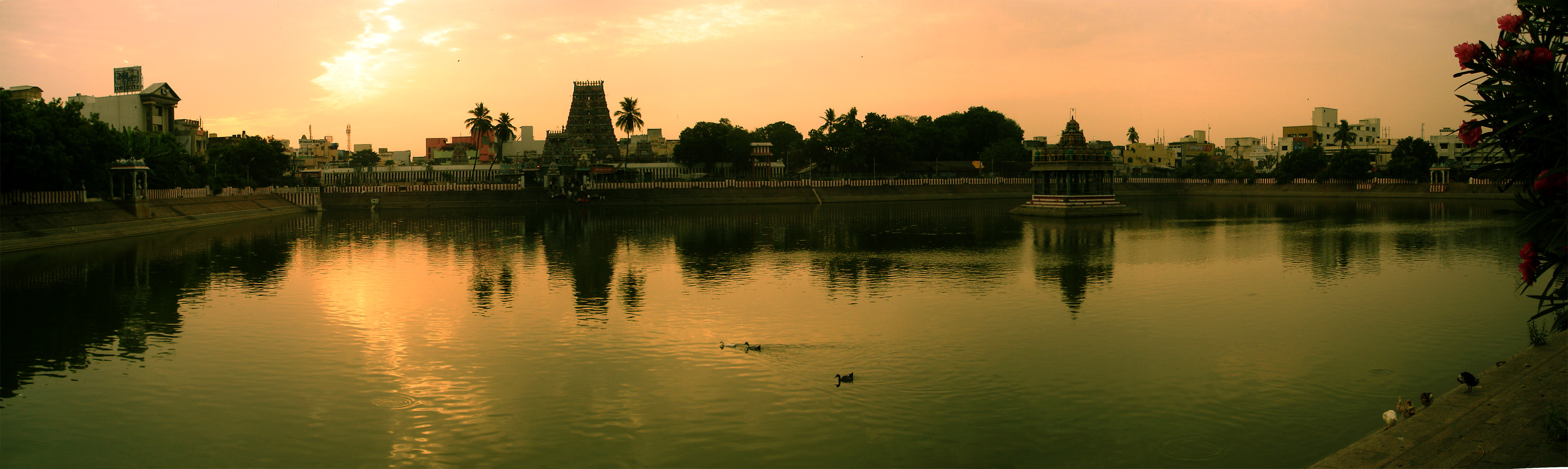
View of the temple tank at dawn.

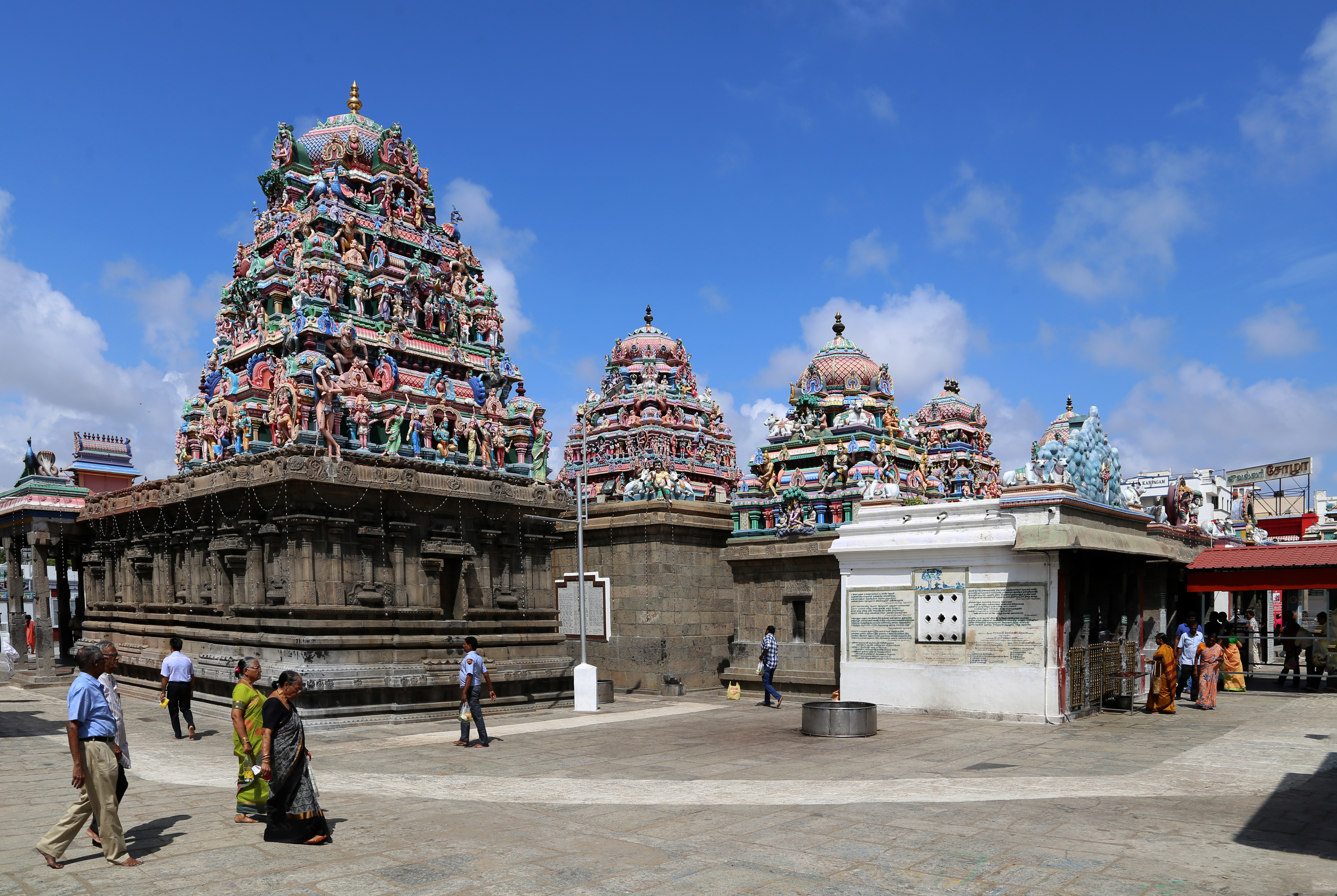
Inner prakaram (corridor) of the temple.

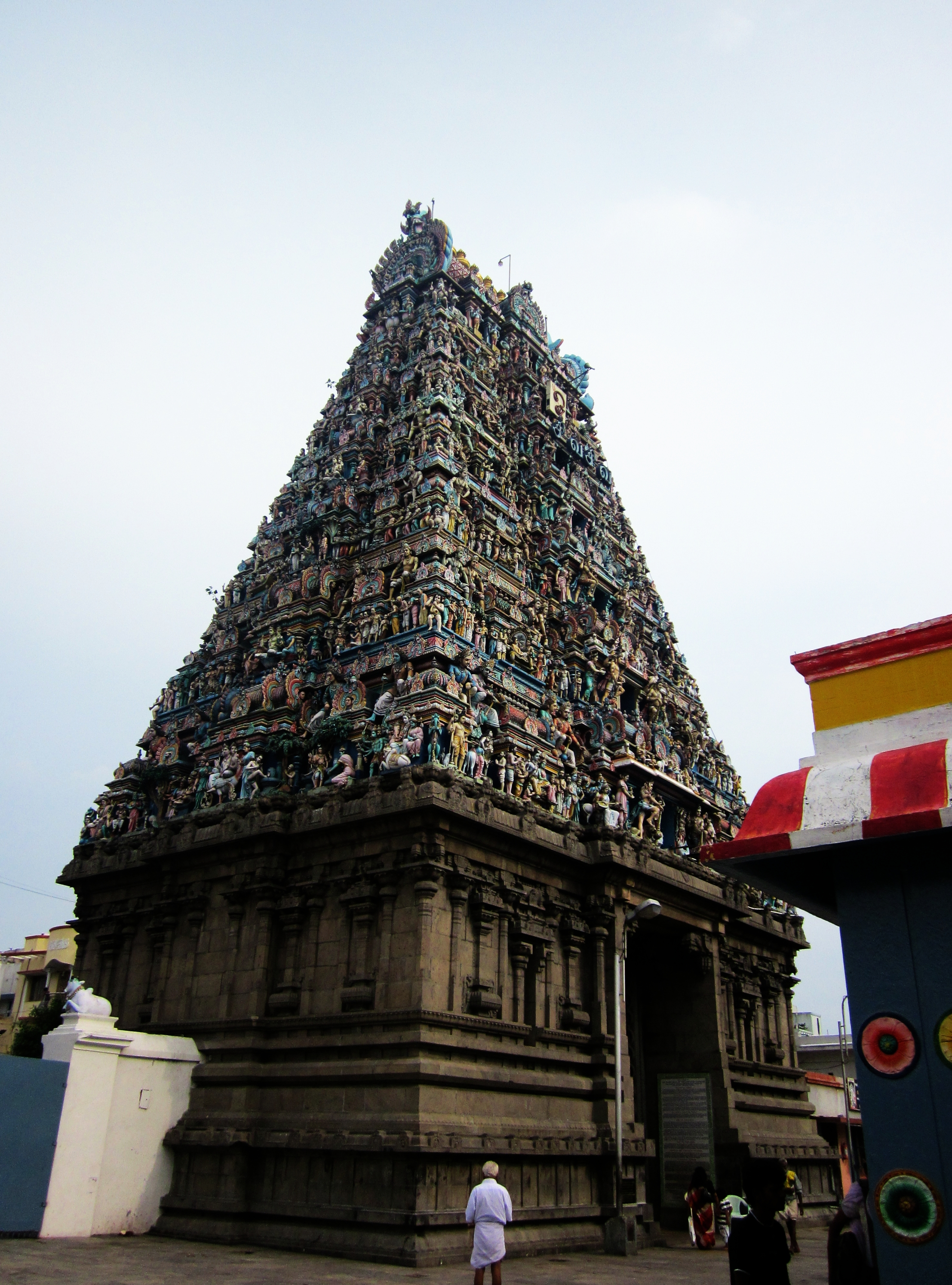
The main tower at the temple.

There is a reference to the temple in Sangam literature of the 1st to 5th centuries and the earliest post-Sangam mention is found in the 6th century Tamil literature. The temple and the deity were immortalized in Tamil poetry in the works of Tevaram by poet saint belonging to the 7th century – Thirugnana Sambanthar has composed the 6th Poompavai pathigam in praise of the temple. Arunagirinathar, a 15th-century poet, sings praise of the temple in Tirumayilai Tirupugal. The 12th-century poet Gunaveera Pandithar sings about Neminathan under Theerthangar neminathar pugazh. Tirumayilai Prabanthangal is a compilation of four works on the temple and the deity.

== See also ==
- Parthasarathy Temple
- Religion in Chennai
- Heritage structures in Chennai
