= Royapuram fire temple =

Temple in India

Coordinates: 13°6′40″N 80°17′40″E

- Jal Phiroj Clubwala Dar E Meher
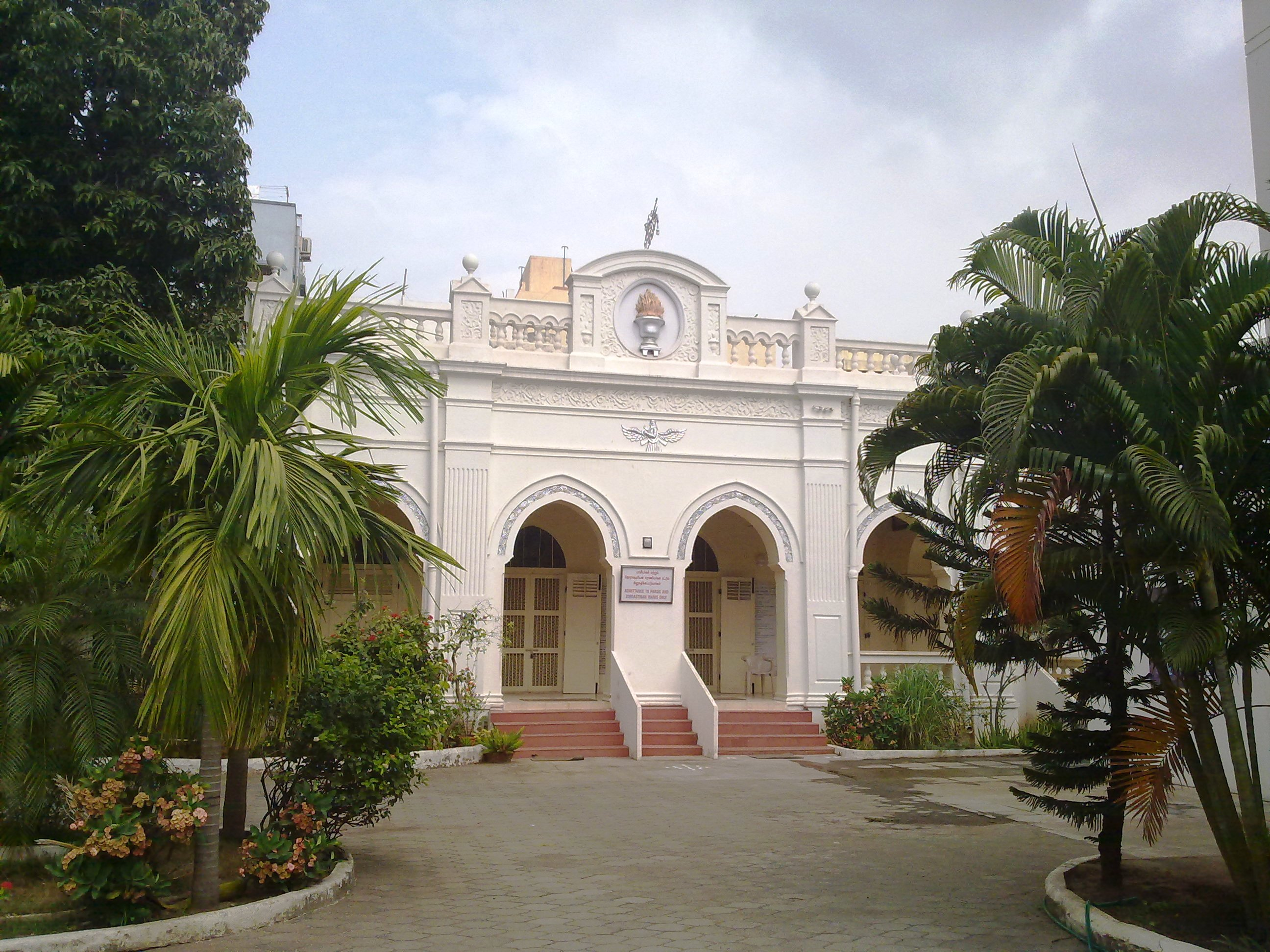
- Entrance of the Royapuram Fire Temple

Religion
- District: Chennai
- Region: Royapuram
- Year consecrated: 1910
- Status: Functional

Location
- Location: Arathoon Road, Royapuram, Chennai, India
- State: Tamil Nadu
- Interactive map of Royapuram fire temple

Architecture
- Architect: Hormusji Nowroji
- Groundbreaking: 9 February 1909
- Completed: 1909
- Construction cost: ₹30,000 (Initial)

Jal Phiroj Clubwala Dar E Meher, popularly known as the Royapuram fire temple, is a Zoroastrian fire temple at Royapuram, Chennai, India. It was built in 1910 and donated to the Madras Parsi Zarthosti Anjuman by philanthropist Phiroj M. Clubwala. The temple is one of the 177 odd fire temples in the world, of which some 150 are in India. It is the only Parsi fire temple in Tamil Nadu and surrounding region, including Puducherry and Kerala. The flame in the temple is burning continuously ever since the temple was built and is stoked five times a day by the priest.

== History ==
Although Parsis first arrived in Madras between 1795 and 1809, when a group of six Parsis and two priests from Coorg landed in the city and bought land at Royapuram opposite the Catholic Church, there was no official priest in the community for over 100 years till 1906, and there was no place of worship until the fire temple was built. A Parsi panchayat was formed in 1876. From 1887, the Madras Parsi Panchayat started collecting monthly contributions from members in the region for a Mobed Fund, chiefly intended to maintain a mobed (priest) and to eventually establish a place of worship, for which a significant contribution was made by Sir Dinshaw Petit of Bombay in 1896. The community then purchased a plot of land in Royapuram, where the community by then had established itself to a significant extent. However, plans to build a temple in this plot were delayed.

When Phiroj Muncherji Clubwala, a benefactor of the Parsi community in Madras, lost his 14-year-old son Jal in February 1906, he found it difficult to perform the prayers and rituals the Parsi way as there was no fire temple in the city. He soon created a corpus to enable the Parsi community in Madras to avail the services of a mobed. The first mobed was Ervad Dosabhai Pavri. In 1907, Clubwala decided to gift the Madras Parsi Zarthosti Anjuman (the successor of the Panchayat) a piece of land that he bought opposite his house on West Mada Church Street in Royapuram, after noting the slow progress of collections for the Mobed Fund and for a new fund that a committee of six was making efforts to swell. The new land was located near the site earmarked earlier. On 9 February 1909, the foundation stone for a fully equipped Agiari was laid by Hormusji Nowroji, a civil engineer and president of the Parsi Anjuman for almost 45 years, and an amount of ₹ 30,000 raised by the community was provided to maintain the temple. With the community raising the money in short order, Clubwala built the temple and the Anjuman named the temple after Clubwala's son. Nowroji also designed the temple and supervised its building.

On 7 August 1910, the temple was consecrated as the Jal Phiroj Clubwala Dar-e-Meher. Dosabhai Pavri had retired shortly before the consecration, and Ervad Hormasji Adarji Gai was appointed the new priest. With the consecration of the new temple, he became its first pathank (priest-in-charge). Clubwala also donated the Anjuman a block of land adjacent to the temple and built an accommodation for the priests. Clubwala also built a block in the Anjuman Bagh and donated a large tract of land near his house to St. Kevin's Presentation Convent and School, a school for girls in North Madras.

After Clubwala died in August 1927, the Phiroj Clubwala Memorial Hall was built to honour his memory, which was inaugurated by his widow Srinibai on 14 August 1930. The Parsi Club was also built in 1930 to honour Clubwala.

The Parsis' ecclesiastical head in Madras, Ervad Peshotan Daji, affectionately called "Pesi", was associated with the fire temple for over 60 years. The fire temple was earlier managed by his grandfather (from 1913 to 1938) and later by his father (from 1938 to 1968). Peshotan Daji started as an assistant priest in 1924 at the age of 12 and continued to serve the community till 1983. During World War I, when the German warship SMS Emden bombed the Madras High Court premises, Royapuram was evacuated. Peshotan Daji, however, refused to leave the fire temple and stayed on alone to keep the fire burning.

In 1985, a housing unit for the chief priest, styled in sympathy with the fire temple, was built within the temple campus. The nearby choultry, which is the regular gathering place for the Parsis in the city, was restored in 2011.

== The temple today ==
The temple is located on Arathoon Road, a street that also has a Hindu temple, a mosque, a Roman Catholic and a Protestant church. Only Parsis and Zoroastrian Iranis are admitted into the sanctum sanctorum. The fire at the temple has never been extinguished since the construction of the temple. Priests tend to the fire five times a day during prayers.

== Centenary celebrations ==
In July 2010, the Madras Parsi Association and the members of The Madras Parsi Zarthosti Anjuman jointly marked the centenary celebrations with a three-day function and a medley of rituals and entertainment with a performance by musician Gary Lawyer. The function was inaugurated by former president A. P. J. Abdul Kalam.

== See also ==
- Religion in Chennai
- List of fire temples in India
- Zoroastrianism in India
- Heritage structures in Chennai
