= Religion in Chennai =

Ethno-religious communities in Chennai

Religion in Chennai (2011)
1. Hinduism (80.7%)
2. Islam (9.45%)
3. Christianity (7.72%)
4. Jainism (1.11%)
5. Buddhism (0.06%)
6. Sikhism (0.06%)
7. Other religion (0.04%)
8. Not religious (0.83%)

Chennai is religiously cosmopolitan, with its denizens following various religions, chief among them being Hinduism, Islam, Christianity, Sikhism, Jainism, Buddhism, and Zoroastrianism. Chennai, along with Mumbai, Delhi, Kochi, and Kolkata, is one of the few Indian cities that are home to a diverse population of ethno-religious communities.

With the majority of the people in India following Hinduism, Chennai, like other Indian cities, is home to more Hindus than any other religion. Chennai has centres of worship for a multitude of faiths. According to 2011 census, majority of the population are Hindus (80.7 percent), Muslims (9.45 percent), Christians (7.72 percent), Jains (1.11 percent) and Sikhs (0.06 percent).

== Demographics ==
Religions and their adherents (in percentage of total population)
Census	Hindu	Muslim	Christian	Jain	Buddhist	Sikh	Others	Not Stated
1901	80.6	11.3	8.0	0.05	0.02	0	0.02	
1911	80.2	11.4	8.1	0	0	0	0.35	
1921	81.2	10.1	8.4	0.2	0.1	0	0	
1931	80.4	10.8	8.4	0.4	0.05	0	0	
1941	79.9	12.3	5.9	0	0	0	2.31	
1951	81.6	9.9	7.8	0.4	0.07	0.07	0.09	
1961	85	7.5	6.9	0.5	0.02	0.04	0.07	
1971	84.1	8.5	6.6	0.7	0.03	0.05	0.01	
1981	84.4	8.1	6.4	0.7	0.1	0.04	0.06	
1991	83.9	8.7	6.4	0.9	0.02	0.04	0.03	
2001	81.3	9.4	7.6	1.1	0.04	0.06	0.23	
2011	80.7	9.45	7.7	1.1	0.06	0.06	0.04	0.8

== Hinduism ==
Hinduism is the native faith of Chennai. The origin of Hinduism in the city dates back to antiquity. The temple towns of Mylapore, Triplicane, Thiruvottiyur, Saidapet and Thiruvanmiyur, which are now part of Chennai city, had been visited by the Saivite saints called Nayanmars and Vaishnavite saints called Alvars. The saint Vayilar Nayanar was born and brought up in Mylapore. Sambandar gives a physical description of Mylapore in his hymns:

In Mylapore of beautiful groves,
The waves creep up to the shore and then dance on it
As do the fisherfolk who spear the many fish in the waters,
Kapaleeswaram in its plenty celebrates the Thiruvadhirai festival,
Is it done for you to miss this excitement, Poompavai? (English translation)

and Thirumangai Alvar gives description of Thiruvallikeni in his hymns as:

The Vedas, the essence off vedas, which the Saints read
Hail you as Paramatma
The one without start and end and the god of Gods
Highly respected women who cannot be compared in their qualities live here
I saw this Mada-Maa Mayilai Thiruvaallikeni ( English Translation )

The early dubashes or Indian merchants who worked for the British East India Company were devout Hindus. The Chennakesava Perumal Temple, considered to be the chief Hindu temple of Madraspatnam and first to be built since the founding of the city in 1640, was constructed by the dubash Beri Thimappa in 1646. Chennai is also an important centre of the Ramakrishna Order whose oldest institution the Sri Ramakrishna Math was founded in Chennai in May 1897. According to a 1981 estimate, there were about 600 Hindu temples in Chennai, including the Chennakesava Perumal Temple, Chenna Mallesvarar Temple, Kapaleeswarar Temple, Parthasarathy Temple, Vadapalani Andavar Temple, Ashtalakshmi Kovil, Kalikambal Temple and the Thiruvalluvar Temple.

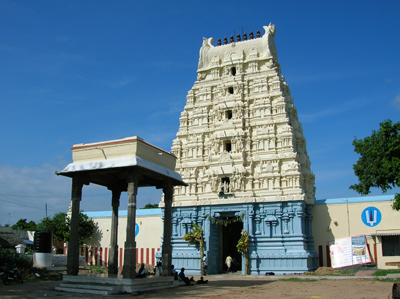
Bakthavathsala Perumal Temple, Tirunindravur

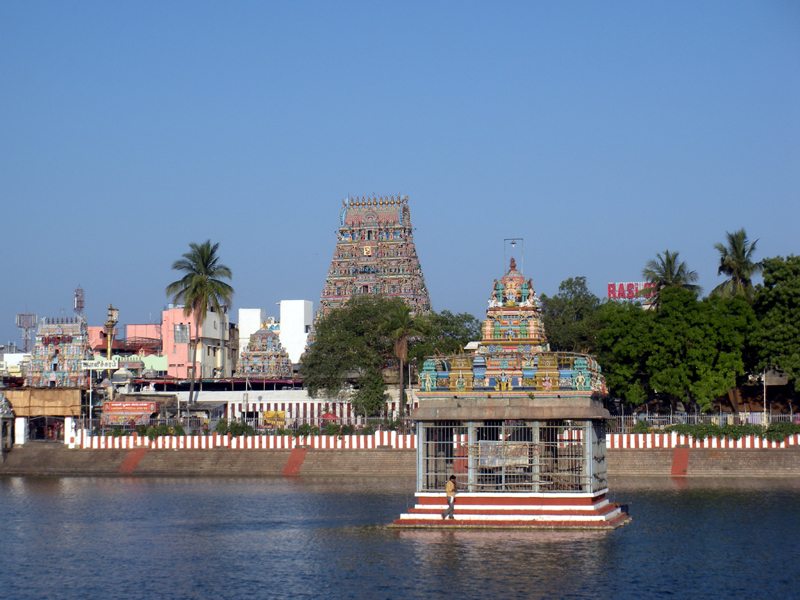
Kapaleeshwarar Temple, Mylapore

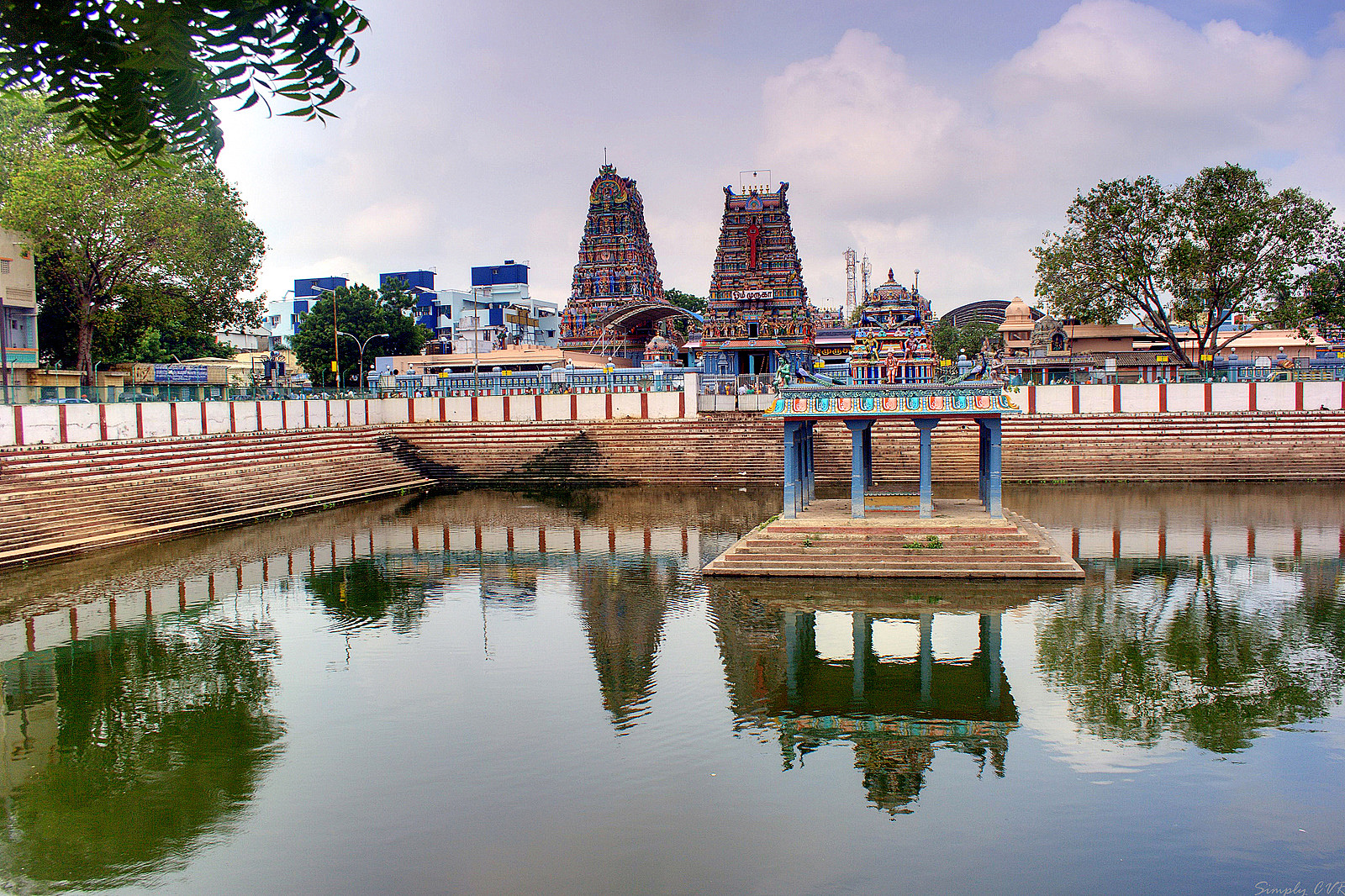
Vadapalani Murugan Temple, Vadapalani

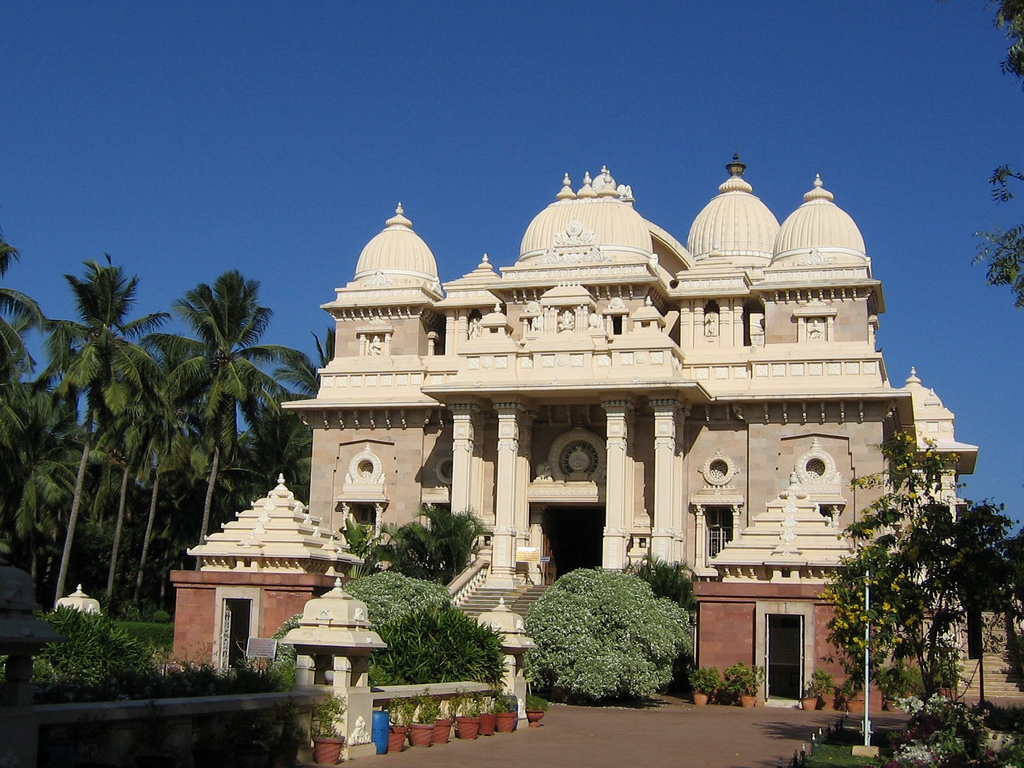
Sri Ramakrishna Mutt, Mylapore

== Islam ==
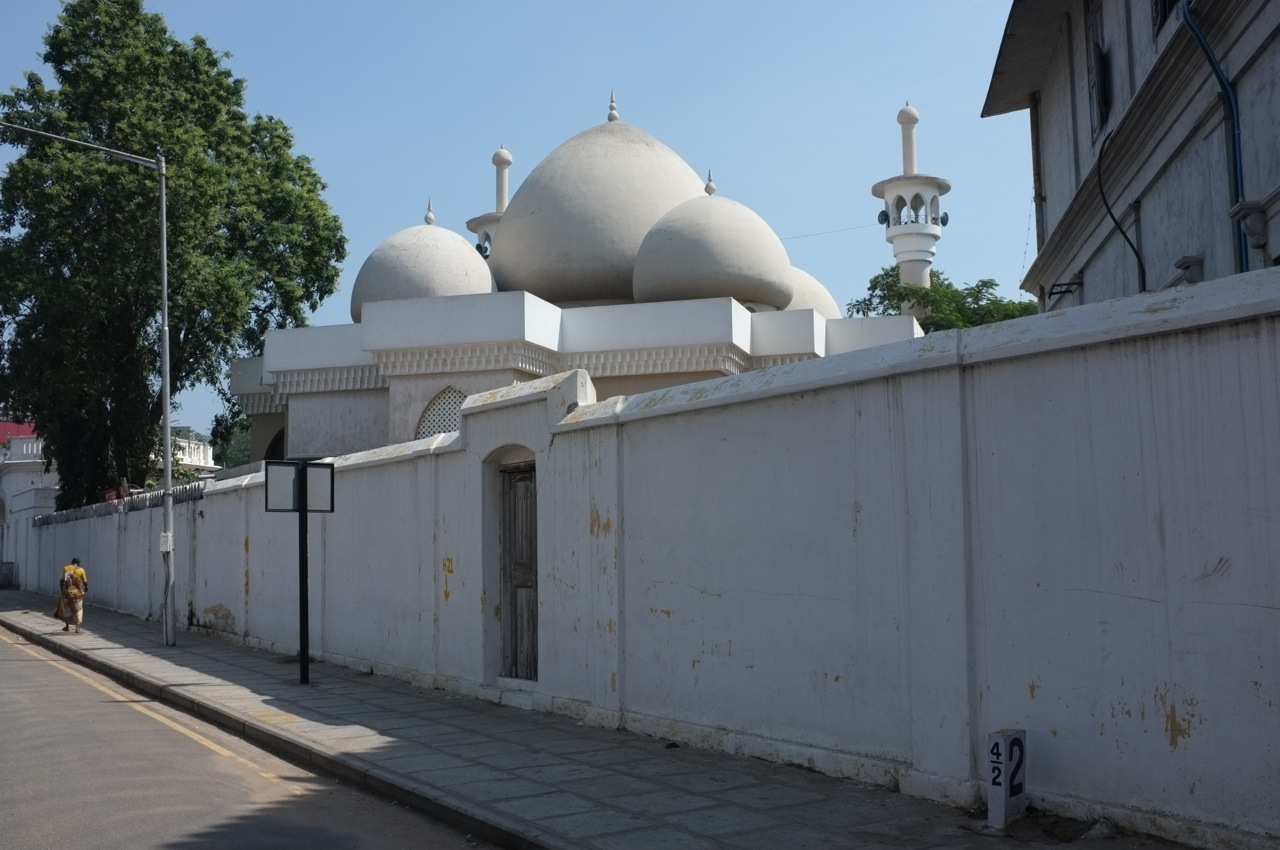
Thousand Lights mosque on Anna Salai

Recorded presence of Muslims in Chennai dates from the 9th century CE onwards. The oldest known mosques in Madras – the ones at Pulicat and Kovalam – were built in the 10th century CE. Both Marco Polo in the 13th century and Duarte Barbosa in the 16th century record that St. Thomas was venerated by Christians as well as Muslims of Madras. Muslims living in the city have varied cultural and historical origins and are currently the second largest religious community of Chennai, accounting for around 9.4 percent of the population according to the 2001 census. An overwhelming majority of Chennai Muslims belong to the Sunni sect and Shia sect minority does exist. There is also a small minority of Ahmadiyya muslims. Majority of Muslims in Tamil Nadu are native Tamil speakers while Dakhini, a dialect of Urdu, is spoken by a minority. Others speak other languages.

== Christianity ==
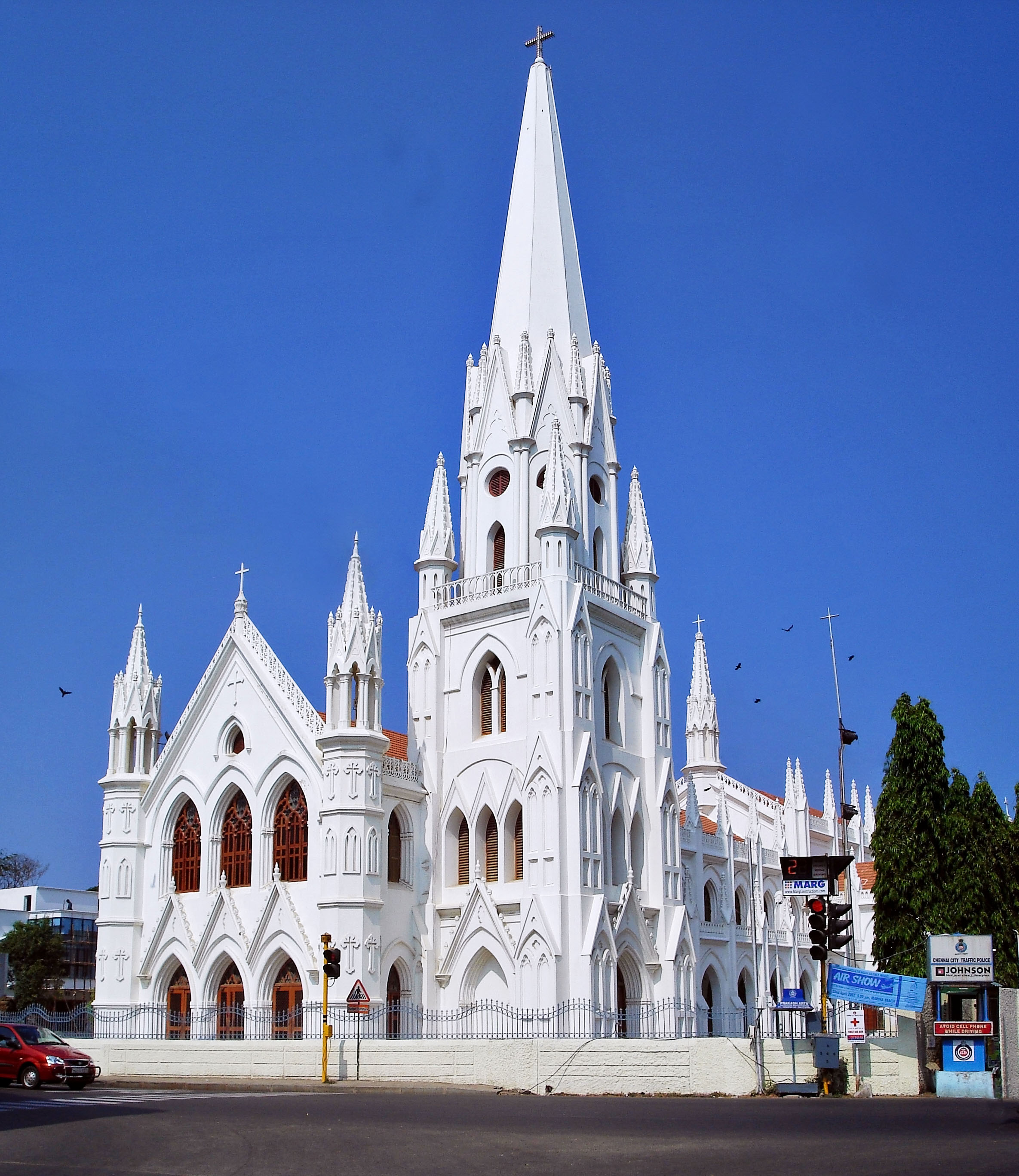
Santhome Basilica in Chennai, built over the site where St. Thomas is believed to be originally interred

Christianity is believed to be introduced in Chennai by the Christian apostle St. Thomas, who is believed to have preached in the city between the years 52 CE and 70 CE. St. Thomas, one of the twelve apostles of Jesus Christ, was martyred in St. Thomas Mount in the southern part of the city and was buried in Mylapore. San Thome Basilica, one of the earliest churches in the city, was built in 1523 by Portuguese explorers, over the supposed tomb of St. Thomas. The city has one of the highest population of Christians among major Indian cities, accounting for 7.6 percent of the city's population. The Roman Catholic Church plays a major role in Chennai's Christian population.

== Sikhism ==
The earliest arrival of Sikhs in the city is not known officially as there are no records. However, the migration is said to have been consistent before, during, and after the partition of India. As of 2012, there were about 300 Sikh families residing in the city, which increased to about 500 odd families by 2019. The Sri Guru Nanak Sat Sangh Sabha Gurudwara is located in T-nagar. It was established in 1949, is a centre for social, religious and spiritual activities and is a common point for the Sikh families in the city to converge during special occasions and festivals.

== Jainism ==
Jainism was one of the oldest religions of Chennai and, alongside Buddhism, was introduced in the pre-Christian era. There are both North-Indian and Tamil Jains in the city, although the former outnumber the latter. There are about 100 Jain temples in the city built by the North-Indian Jains, whereas there are only 18 Tamil Jain temples catering to roughly 1,500 Tamil Jain families. The Adheeshwar Jain temple in Puzhal, dedicated to Adi Bhagwan, Adeeswar, Adinath, Adi Jain, and Rishabhadev, is believed to be of 1st century BCE. George Town has the greatest share of Jain temples in the city. A North-Indian-styled Jain temple was built at Adhiyappa Naicken Street in 1899. There are two more Jain temples on Mint Street. The Shantinath temple in T. Nagar is a Swetambar Jain temple. Other Jain temples include those in Chintadripet and Vepery.

== Buddhism ==
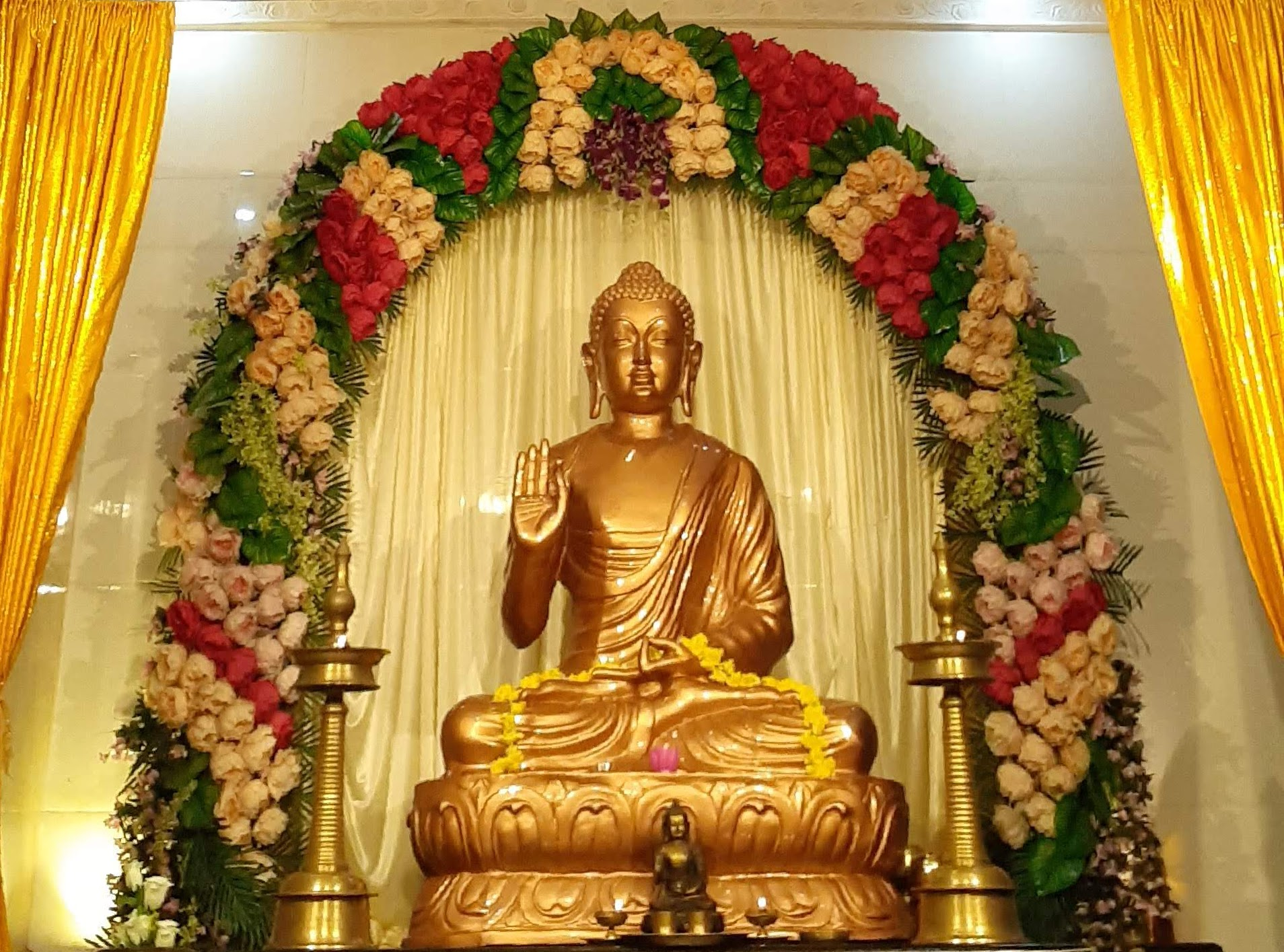
Statue of the Buddha at the Buddhist temple in Chennai

Buddhism is another ancient religion of Chennai introduced in the pre-Christian era. The city's only Buddhist temple, the Sri Lanka Maha Bodhi Centre, is located at Egmore.

== Zoroastrianism ==
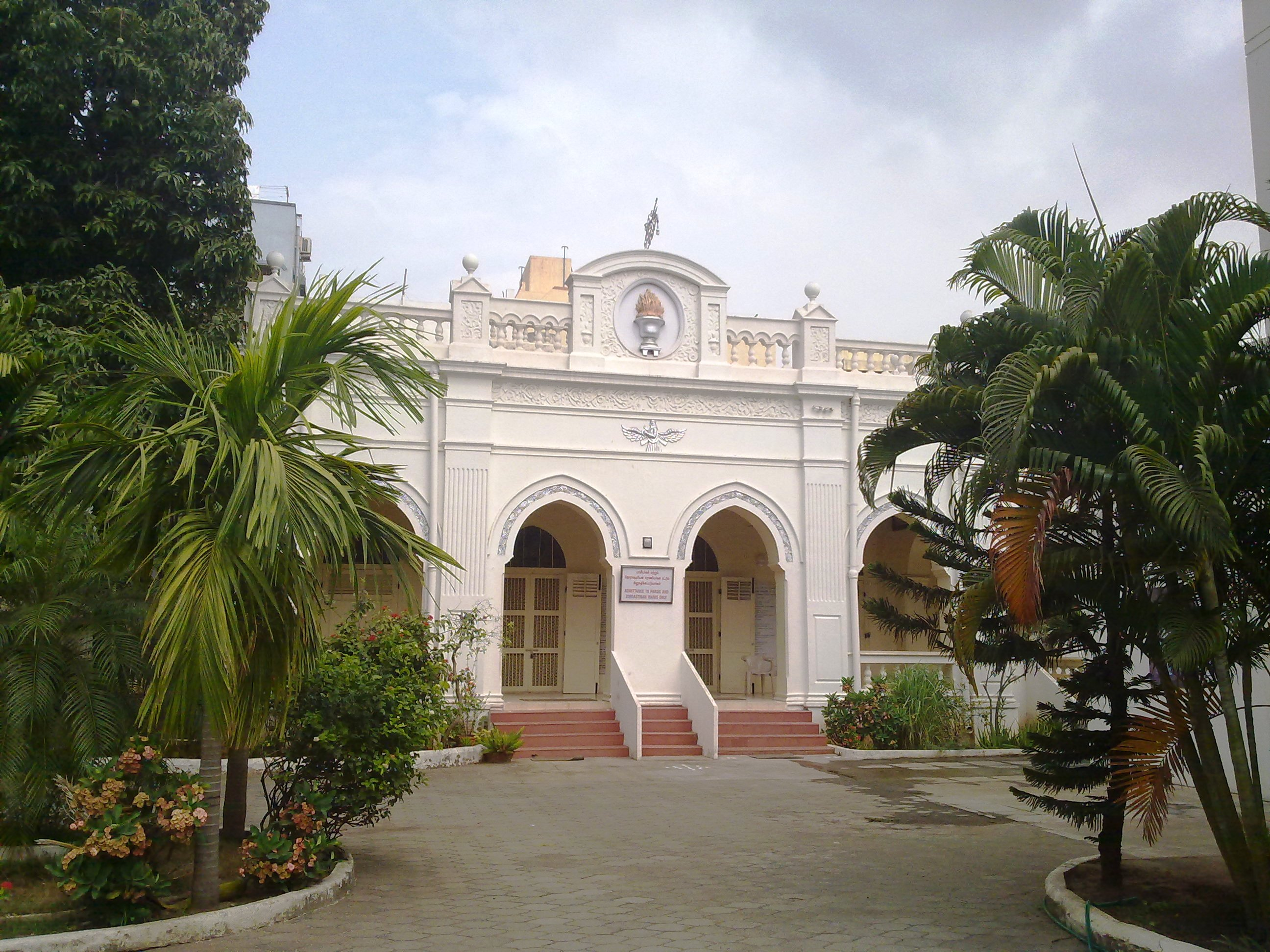
Royapuram fire temple, the only Parsi temple in Chennai

Parsis first arrived in the city in 1809 from Coorg when the ruling King's brother sent a deputation to the Governor of Fort St. George to deliver a picture. Hirijibhai Maneckji Kharas was the first Parsi to land in the city, who was accompanied by five other Parsis and two priests who bought land at Royapuram opposite the Catholic Church. By 1900s, the Parsis established themselves well in the city, dealing in cars, cycles, perfumes and dyes. The first Iranis came to Madras around 1900 and soon became known for their Irani cafes and also established or managed theatres. There was no official priest in the community for over 100 years till 1906. There was no place of worship until the Royapuram fire temple was built in 1909. As of 2010, there were about 250 Parsis in Chennai. Many of them live in Royapuram.

== Judaism ==
Paradesi Jews immigrated to the Indian subcontinent during the 15th and 16th centuries following the expulsion of Jews from Spain. These Sephardic (from Spain and Portugal) immigrants fled persecution and death by burning in the wake of the 1492 Alhambra decree expelling all Jews who did not convert to Christianity from Spain, and King Manuel's 1496 decree expelling Jews from Portugal.

During the 18th and 19th centuries, Paradesi Jews were Sephardi immigrants to the Indian subcontinent from Jewish exodus from Arab and Muslim countries fleeing forcible conversion, persecution and antisemitism. Paradesi Jews of Madras traded in Golconda diamonds, precious stones and corals. They had very good relations with the rulers of Golkonda, because they maintained trade connections to some foreign countries (e.g. Ottoman empire, Europe), and their language skills were useful. Although the Sephardim spoke Ladino (i.e. Judeo-Spanish), in India they learned Tamil and Konkani as well as Judeo-Malayalam from the Cochin Jews, also known as Malabar Jews. After India gained its independence in 1947 and Israel was established as a nation, most of the Paradesi Jews preferred to migrate to Australia and other Commonwealth countries, similar to the choices made by Anglo-Indians. The millennia-long history of Indian Jews was marked by a total absence of antisemitism from the Hindu majority and a visible assimilation in the local languages and cultures. The Paradesi Jews built the Paradesi synagogues and cemeteries in the city.

== Other religious organisations ==
=== Theosophy ===
Chennai is the international base of the Theosophical Society, a spiritual organisation dedicated to the study of world religions and inter-faith dialogue. Since 1882, Chennai has been the headquarters of the Theosophical Society.

== See also ==
- History of Chennai
- Demographics of Chennai
- Religion in India
