= Kalikambal Temple =

Temple in India

Kālikāmbāl Temple
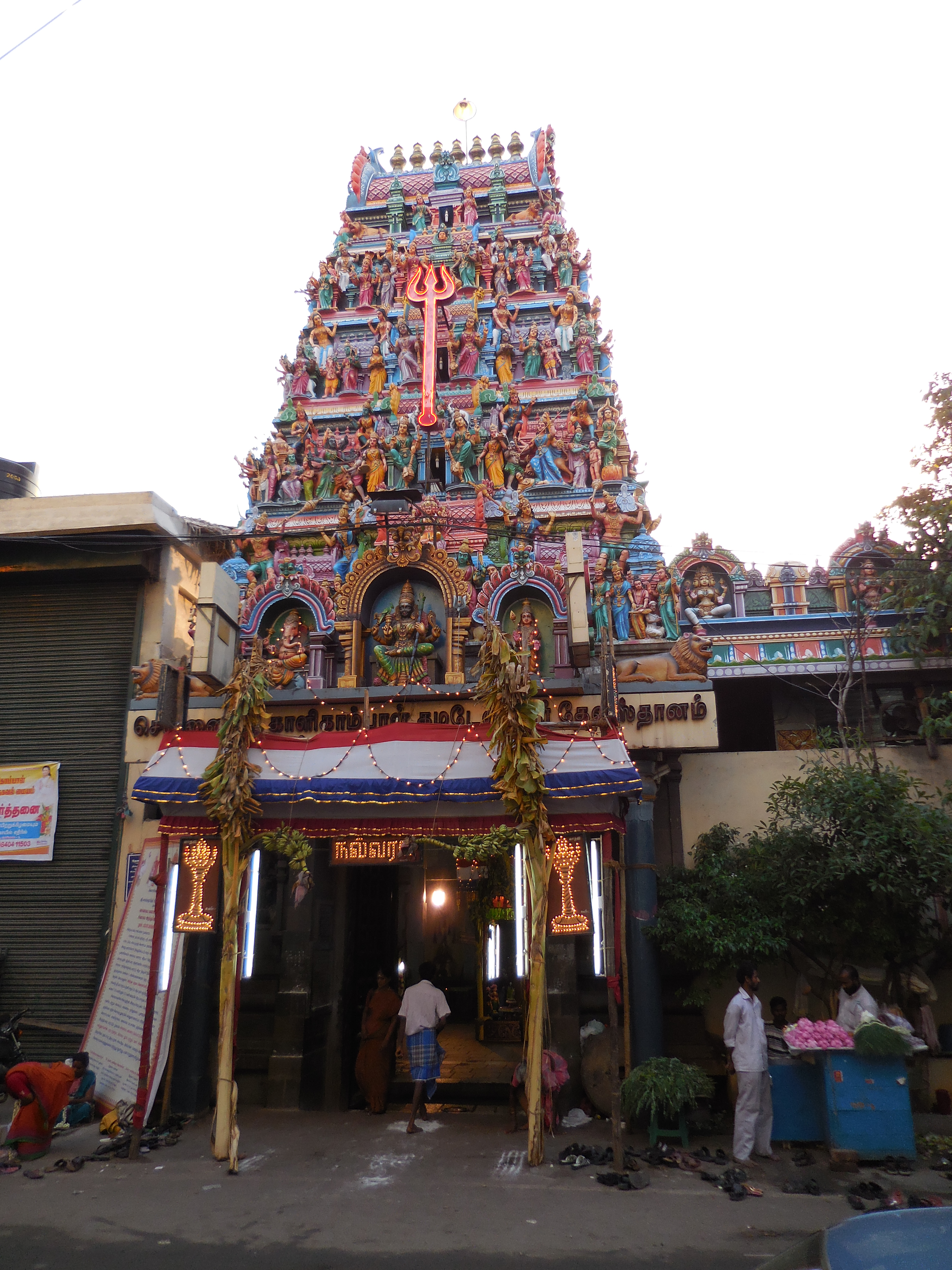
- Kāligāmbāl Temple's Gopuram (Gateway tower) entrance.

- Location in Chennai

Religion
- Affiliation: Hinduism
- District: Chennai
- Deity: Kāligāmbāl (Goddess Pārvathi)

Location
- Location: Thambu Chetty Street, Parry's corner (Old: George Town), Chennai
- State: Tamil Nadu
- Country: India
- Interactive map of Kālikāmbāl Temple
- Coordinates: 13.09455°N 80.2891°E

Architecture
- Type: Hindu temple architecture
- Established: 1640
- Completed: 1678
- Temple: 1

The Kālikāmbal Temple is a Hindu temple dedicated to Shri Kāligāmbāl (Kāmākshi) and Lord Kamadeswarar, located in Parry's corner (Old: George Town) locality of the city of Chennai, Tamil Nadu, India. The temple is located in Thambu Chetty Street, a prominent financial street at Georgetown, running parallel to Rajaji Salai.

== History ==
The temple was originally located closer to the sea shore at the site of the present-day Fort St. George. When the British East India Company built the fort, the temple was relocated to the current site on 1 March 1640 CE and the construction continued until 1678. Chhatrapati Shivaji, the 17th century Maratha warrior-king and the founder of Maratha Empire, had paid a visit in this temple on 3 October 1677. It is believed that a fierce form of Goddess was held in worship earlier and that this form was replaced with the shanta swaroopa (calm posture) form of Goddess Kamakshi by Adi Shankara. Tamil poet Subramaniya Bharathi was a regular visitor of the temple in the early 20th century. The Tamil devotional hymn Ullam Uruguthaiya written by Andavan Picchi in 1952 was conceived and composed at the temple premises.

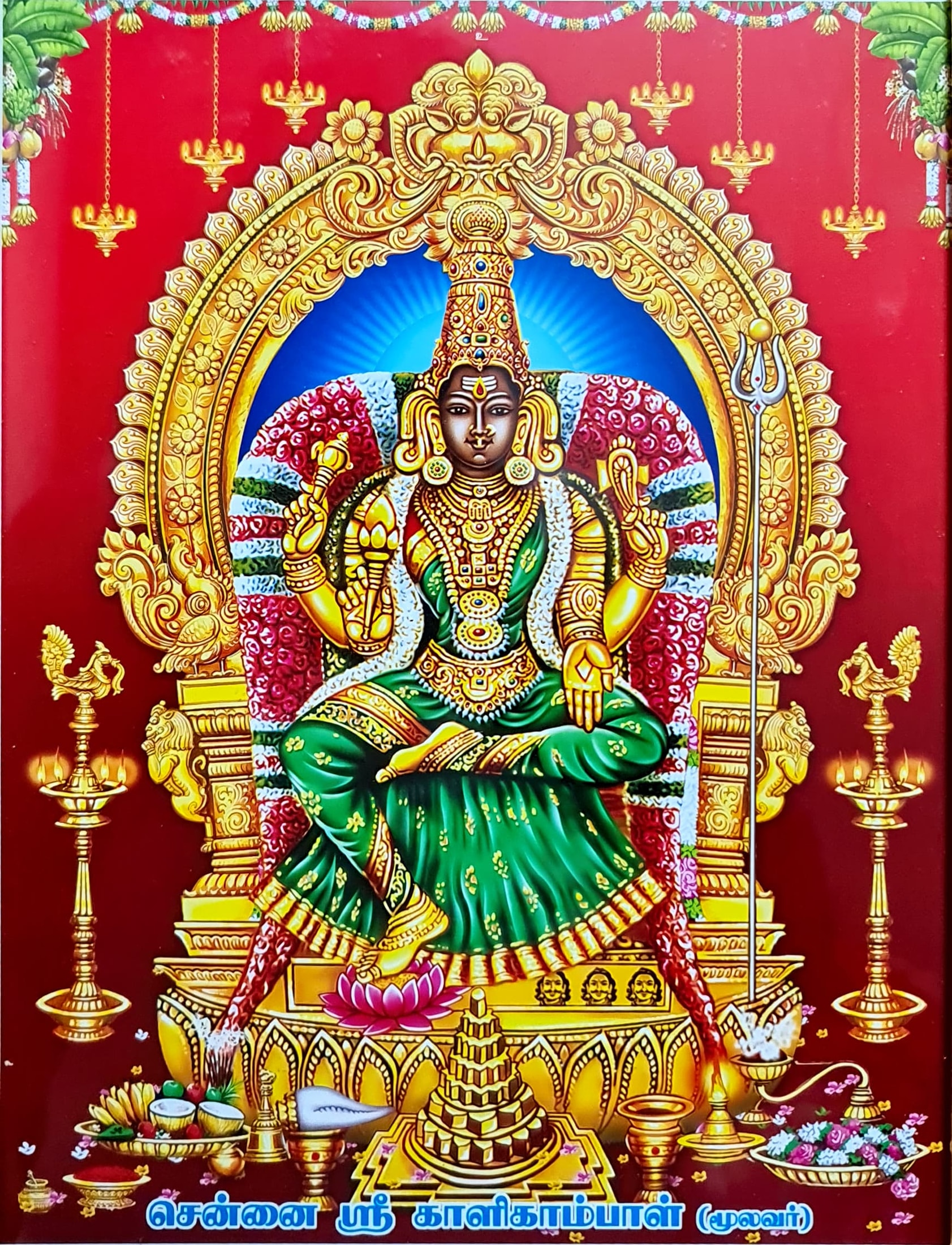
Kaalikaambaal, the chief deity

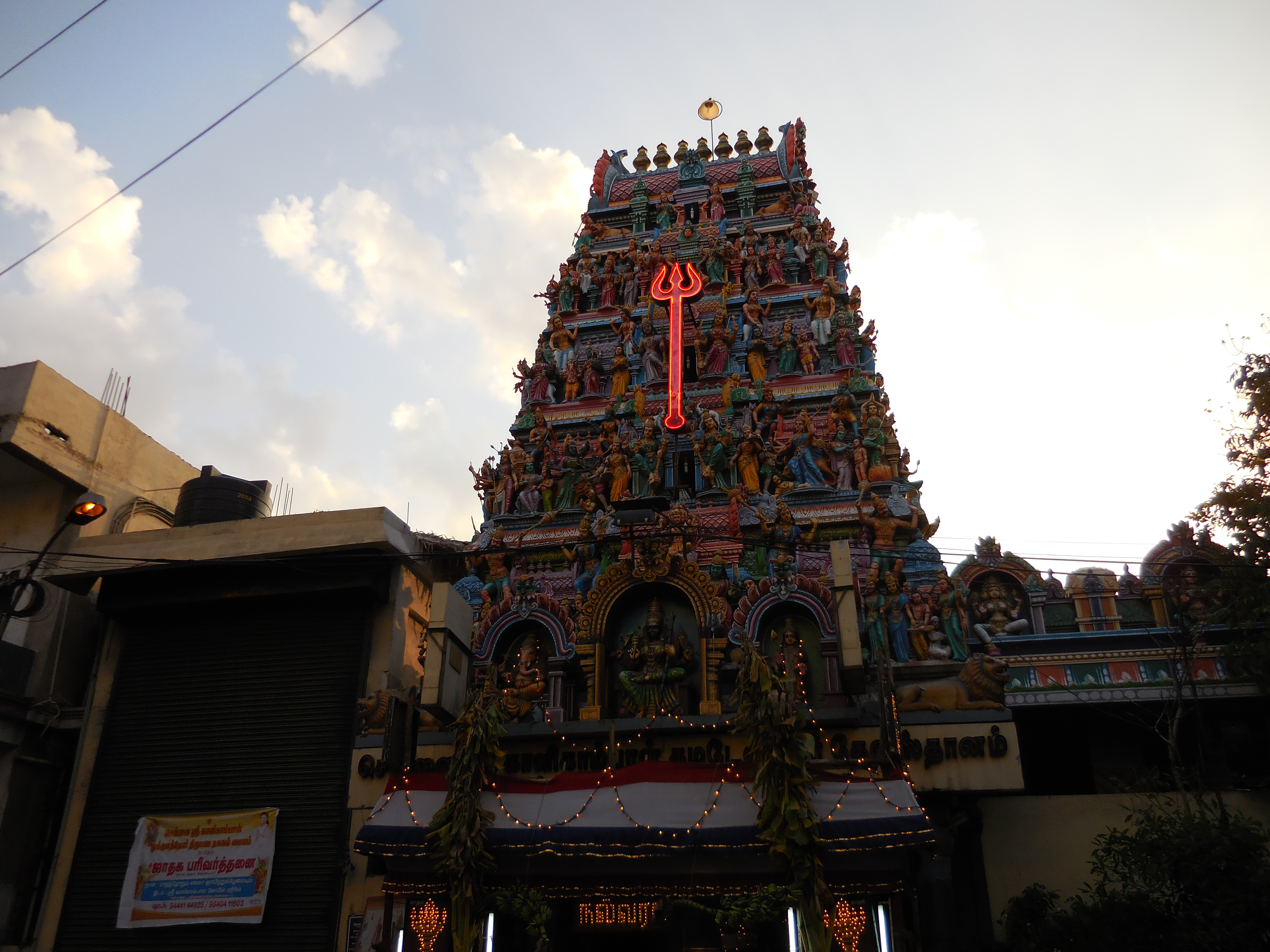
The main Gopuram (tower) of Kālikāmbāl Temple

In the 1980s, a new 10-metre-high tower (rajagopuram) was added to the existing structure. Construction of the tower began on 22 January 1976 and was completed on 21 January 1983. Another major expansion was made in 2014.

The deity is known by other names such as Kottaiamman (Kottai meaning "fort", since it was originally situated at the location of the fort) and Chennamman (Chenthooram or Senthooram meaning holy crimson).

== The temple ==
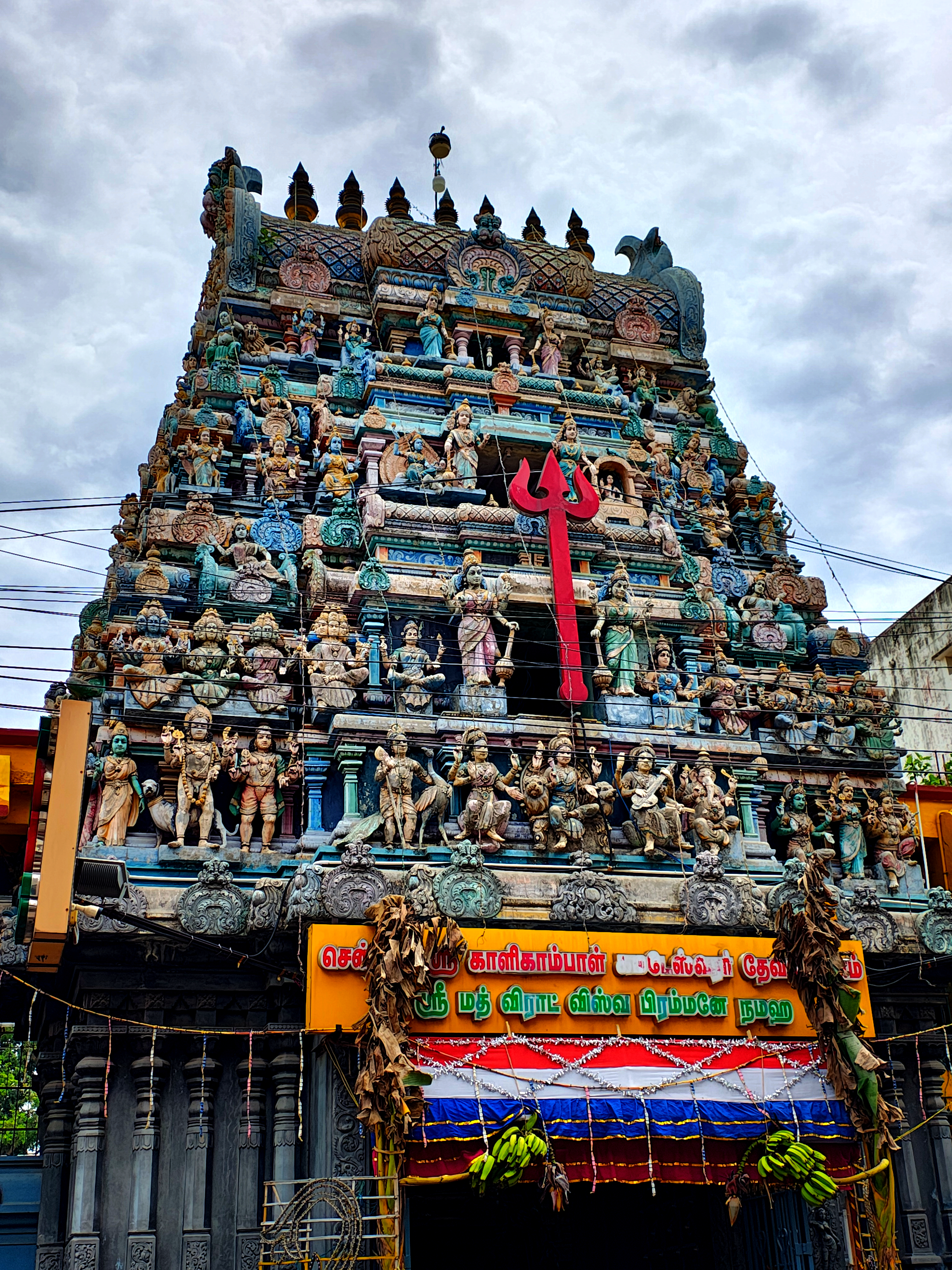
Kalikambal Temple Gopuram

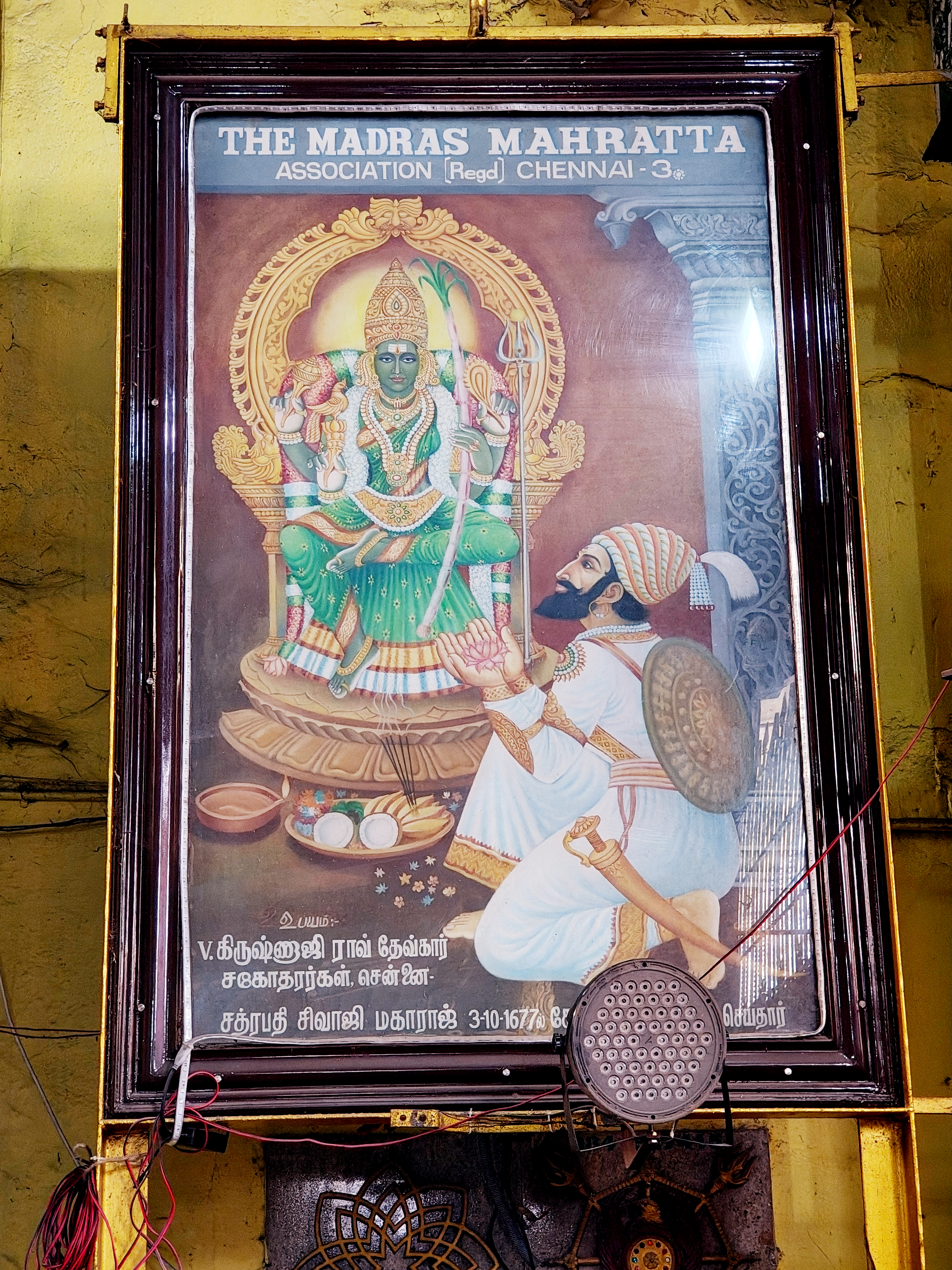
Kalikambal Temple - Chatrapati Shivaji's Visit

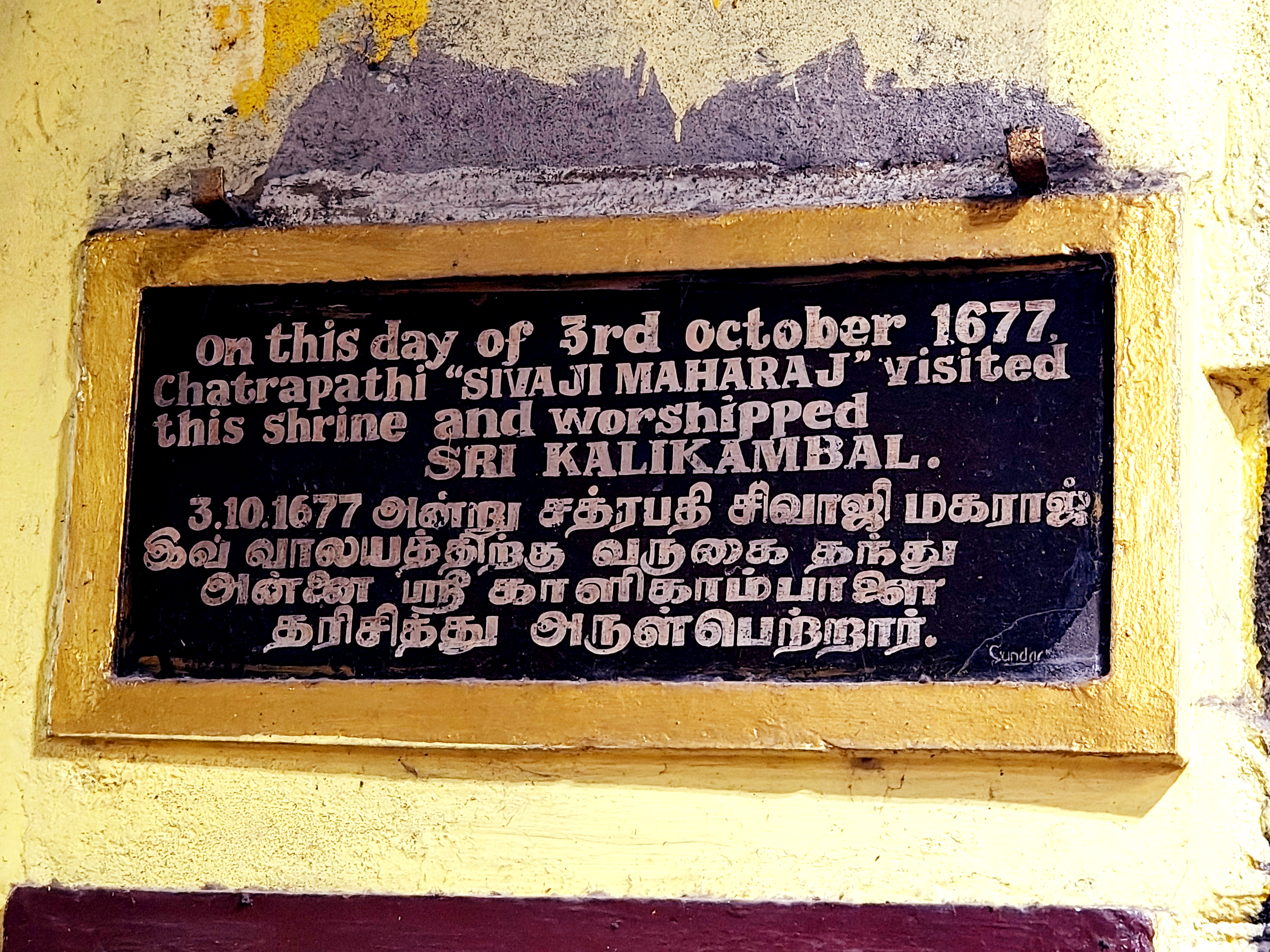
Kalikambal Temple - Chatrapati Shivaji's Visit Plaque

The main deity is faced towards the west. Legend has it that the deity was worshiped by demi-gods and saints, including Vyasa, Agastya, Aangeerasa, Pulasthya, and Varuna. The idol of the main goddess has Thirusiran or Sri Vishwarupan at its feet. The procession deity (urchavar) is called Periyanayaki, an idol in standing posture on a chariot, with idols of Mahalakshmi and Saraswati on either side.

Other shrines in the temple include Shiddi Vinayakar (Ganesh), Shiddi-Bhuddi Vinayakar (Ganesh), Agora Veerabadhra, Mahakali, Vadakathirkama Murugan, Virat Vishwa Parabrahma, Gayatri, Durga, Dakshinamurthy, and Pratyangira.

The sacred water (sthla tirtha) of the temple is seawater and the sacred tree (sthla vriksha) is the mango tree (Mangifera indica).

== Management ==
The temple is hereditarily managed by the Viswakarma Community by the order of Madras High Court, with the managing trustees’ board of 5 members being elected by conducting an election voted by men of the respective community.

== Festivities ==
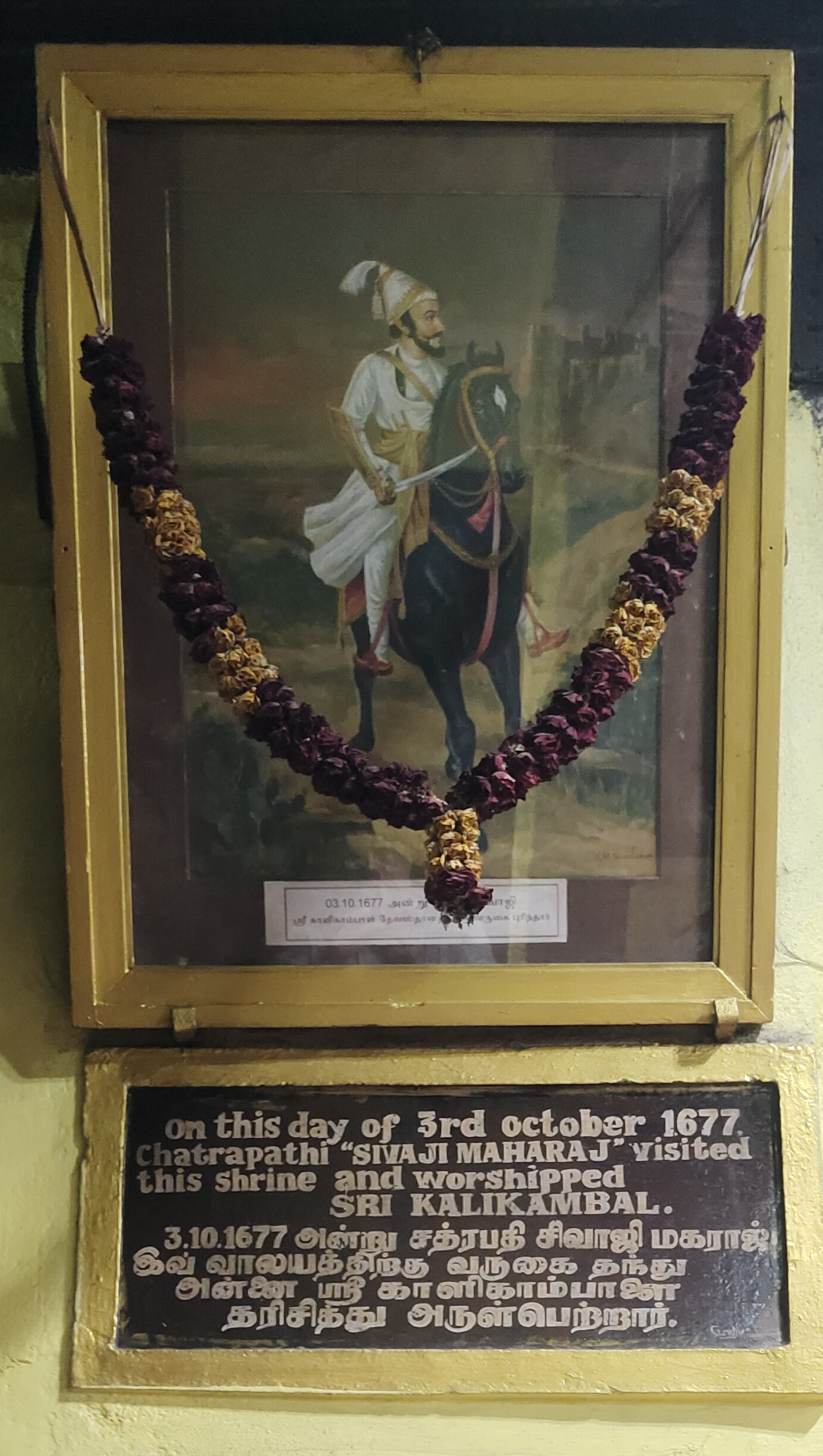
Chatrapati Shivaji's portrait and inscription in the temple premises

Vasantha Urchavam is held in the Tamil month of Aani. Thotti Unjal Urchavam is held in Aadi for 9 consecutive Fridays. Annabishekam is held in the full-moon day of the Tamil month of Aippasi. Other important festivities at the temple include Aadi Pooram, Aadi Krithikai, Ganesh Chathurthi, Navarathri, Skanda Shashti, Mondays of the Tamil month of Karthikai, Karthikai Deepam, Dhanur Pooja in the Tamil month of Maargali, Manikkavasakar celebrations, Aarudhra, Fridays of the Tamil month of Thai, Theerthavaari at the seashore during the Tamil month of Maasi, Vasantha Navarathri in the Tamil month of Panguni, Chithra Pournami in the Tamil month of Chitthirai, Brammothsavam in the Tamil month of Vaikasi.

== See also ==
- Religion in Chennai
- Heritage structures in Chennai
