= Vayilar =

Hindu Nayanar saint

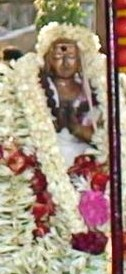

Personal life
- Born: Mylapore
- Honors: Nayanar saint

Religious life
- Religion: Hinduism
- Philosophy: Shaivism, Bhakti

Vayilar (literally "The Voiceless One"), also known as Vayilan, Vayila Nayanar, Vayilar Nayanar and Vayilar of Mayilai, was a Nayanar saint, venerated in the Hindu sect of Shaivism. He is generally counted as the fifty-first in the list of 63 Nayanars. He is said to worshipped the god Shiva, his patron, by his Mind and built a grand temple for him in his mind.

== Hagiographical account ==
A brief account of Vayilar's life is described in the Periya Puranam by Sekkizhar (12th century), which is a hagiography of the 63 Nayanars. Vayilar is one of the six Nayanars from Tondai Nadu and is described to date from the Pallava era.

Vayilar was born and lived his life in Mylapore (Mayilai), presently a neighbourhood in the city of Chennai, India. He was a Vellalar, a caste of agricultural land owners. He was a Shaiva, a devotee of the god Shiva. Considering his name, he is described to be dumb. He did not visit the Kapaleeshwarar Temple, a famous Shiva temple of Mylapore. Vayilar did not believe in idol worship and rituals, instead he performed Manasic ("mental") worship.

Vayilar wanted to create a grand temple for Shiva, but did not have the money to do so. Thus, Vayilar built a temple to Shiva in his mind with his imagination. The temple of the mind is described to have five walls of different metals, the outermost was iron and the innermost was gold. It has many towers of gold and spacious halls with silver walls, gold pillars and studded with precious jewels like diamonds and rubies. Mango-sized diamonds that shone like the Sun replaced ordinary lamps to flood the temple with light. Numerous mirrors were fitted in the temple. The garbha griha (sanctum sanctorum) has a beautifully carved Lingam (aniconic symbol of Shiva) which was decorated with precious stones and fragrant flowers. The Lingam was surrounded by a Kalpavriksha (divine, wish-fulfilling tree) on each side, whose flowers emitted a salubrious fragrance that diffused every part of the temple. Sekkizhar says that: 'His mind was his temple, self-realization was the lamp lit in the temple; he bathed the Lingam in waters of Ananda (bliss) and worshipped the Lord with the elixir of supreme Love'. Vayilar is described to be engaged in the worship of Shiva of his mind temple day and night. He did not care for food or rest, rain or shine, night or day and continue to serve God. Over course of time, the temple and the Lingam disappeared and his soul became one with God.

== Remembrance ==
External image
- Vayilar worshipped in Kapaleeshwarar Temple

One of the most prominent Nayanars, Sundarar (8th century) mentions Vayilar in hymn to various Nayanar saints.

A shrine is dedicated to Vayilar in the Kapaleeshwarar Temple in his home town of Mylapore.

Vayilar is worshipped in the Tamil month of Markazi, when the moon enters the Revati nakshatra (lunar mansion). He receives collective worship as part of the 63 Nayanars. Their icons and brief accounts of his deeds are found in many Shiva temples in Tamil Nadu. Their images are taken out in procession in festivals.
