= Triplicane Big Mosque =

Mosque in Chennai, India

Triplicane Big Mosque (Wallajah Mosque)
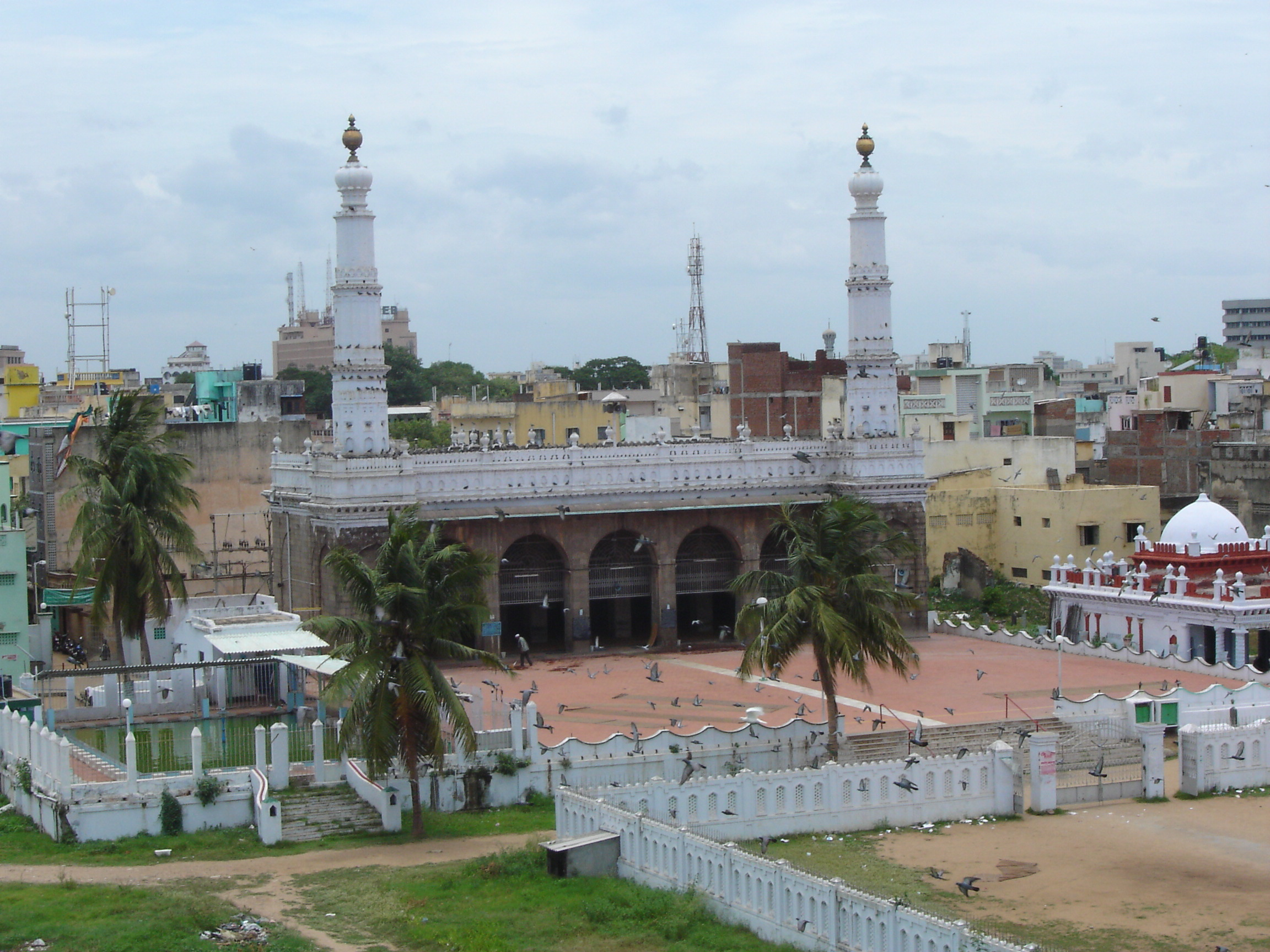
- Entrance to the mosque with dome, water tank and minarets

- Location of the mosque in Chennai

Religion
- Affiliation: Islam
- Ecclesiastical or organisational status: Mosque and dargah
- Status: Active

Location
- Location: Triplicane, Chennai, Tamil Nadu
- Country: India
- Administration: Arcot Endowments Trust
- Coordinates: 13°04′N 80°16′E

Architecture
- Type: Mosque architecture
- Style: Mughal
- Founder: Muhammad Ali Khan Wallajah family
- Completed: 1795

Specifications
- Dome: Two (gold plated)
- Minaret: Two
- Minaret height: 40 m (131 ft) (tallest)
- Materials: Granite, gold plate

The Triplicane Big Mosque, also known as the Wallajah Mosque, is a mosque and dargah complex, located on Triplicane High Road, in the Triplicane neighbourhood of Chennai, in the state of Tamil Nadu, South India. Constructed in the Mughal style, the mosque was completed in 1795 by the family of Muhammad Ali Khan Wallajah, the Nawab of Arcot. It has a large prayer hall, a tank and a large courtyard. The entire structure is constructed with granite without the use of iron or wood.

The Nawab of Arcot was friendly towards fellow Hindus, appointing a Hindu as his chief personal secretary. A chronogram written in Persian by Raja Makhhan Lal Bahdur Khirat, the Hindu Munshi of the Nawab, is located at the entrance to the prayer hall. The mosque is the largest and one of the oldest in Chennai and is active as a place of worship. It is administered by Prince of Arcot Endowments Trust. Most of the administrative staff of the mosque are Hindus, a symbol of peaceful coexistence between the two religions.

== History ==
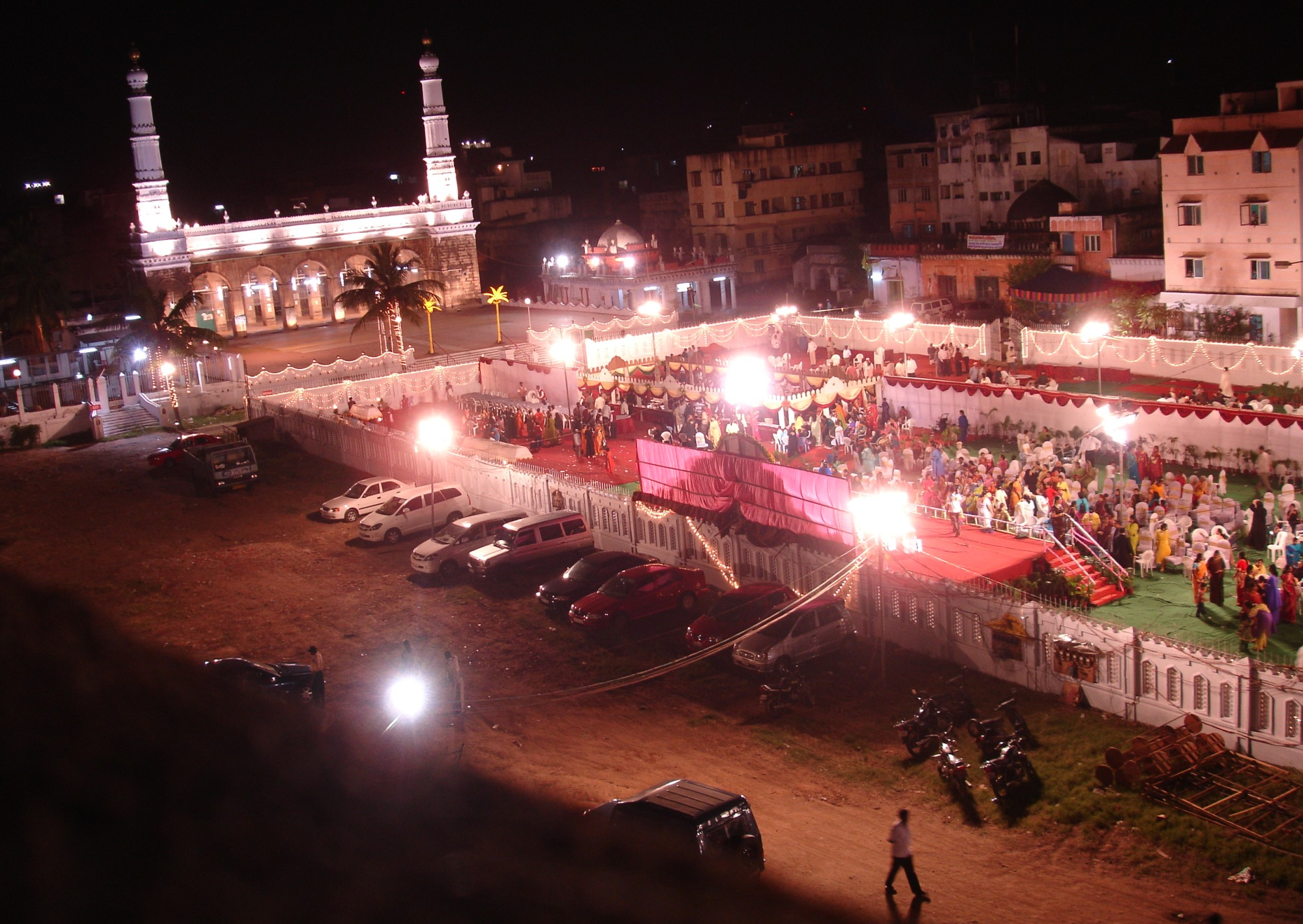
A wedding ceremony in the mosque

The Nawab of Arcot was a loyal ally of the British who offered him Chepauk Palace where he could house his military and administrative buildings. It is believed that Nawab Muhammad Ali moved to Chepauk, located in Triplicane in 1768. There were around 20,000 Rowther Muslims who moved with him to the city. It was then the largest community of Muslims in South India after Hyderabad. The Nawab had full control of the region and all the cases were resolved under Muslim Law irrespective of the religion of the accused. Historians believe that after the mosque was built, it added to the cultural mix in Triplicane, which had a famous Hindu temple in Parthasarathy Temple and the Portuguese Christian stronghold of San Thome.

The Big Mosque was built in 1795 by the family of Muhammad Ali Khan Wallajah, who was the Nawab of Arcot during 1765. There is a plaque in Persian written by the private secretary of the Nawab, Rajah Makhan Lal Khirat. The mosque is now administered by Prince of Arcot Endowments Trust. The plaque indicates that the mosque was renovated during the regime of Azam Jah, who modified its minarets and added golden finials to the spires. The Nawabs of Arcot were friendly towards fellow Hindus, appointing a Hindu as chief personal secretary. A significant number of the administrative staff of the mosque are Hindus, which is seen as a symbol of a harmonious mix of cultures.

== Architecture ==
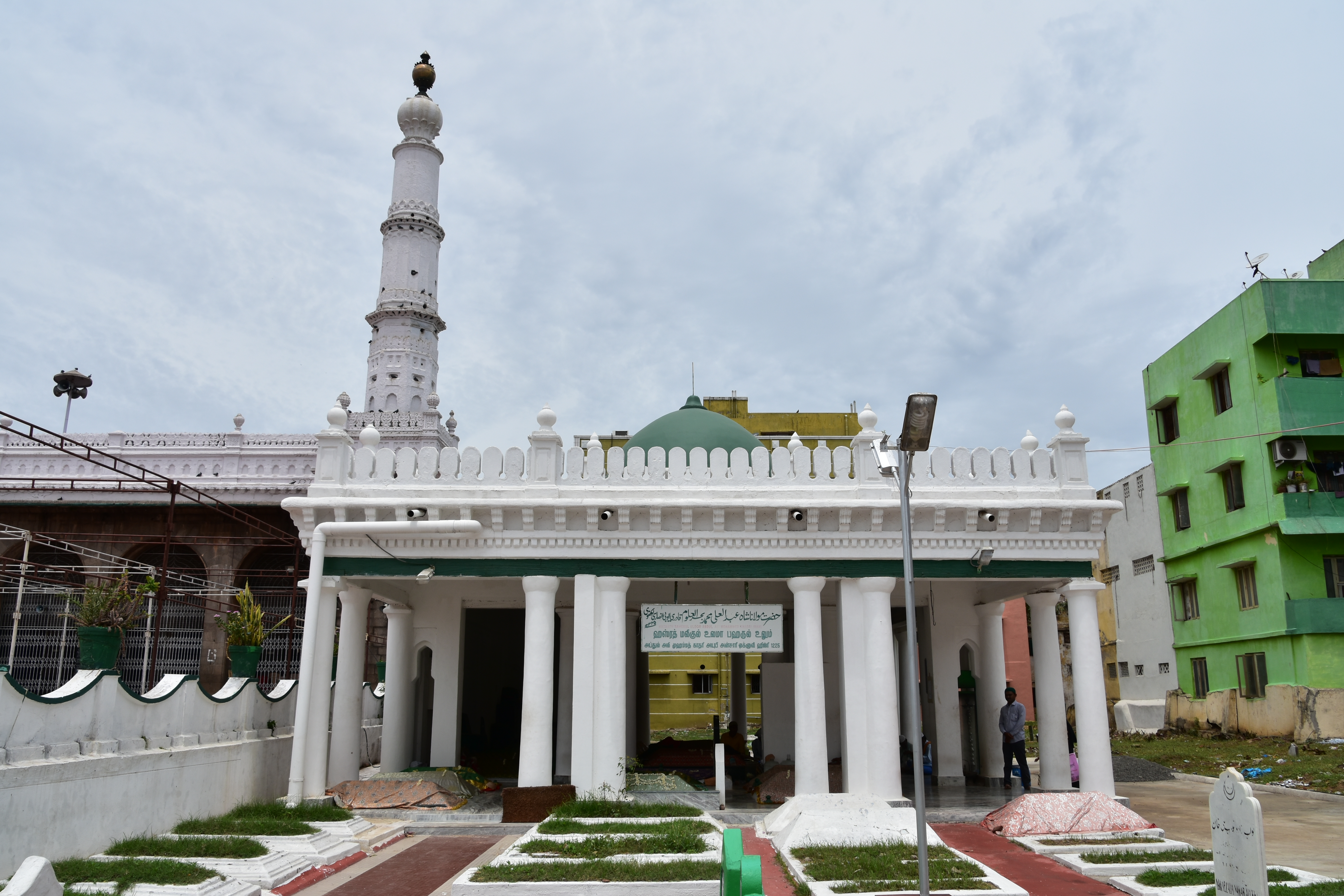
Dargah near Wallajah mosque

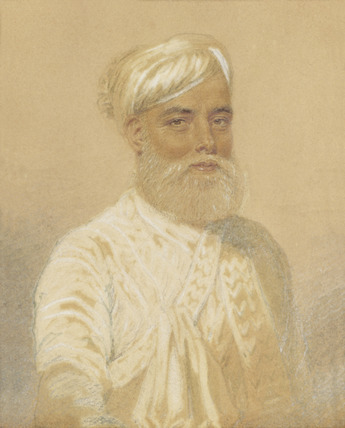
Muhammad Ali Khan Wallajah, the Nawab of Arcot, who built the Biq Mosque

Big Mosque is the largest mosque located in Chennai from the time of its establishment. It is constructed of granite without any iron or wooden additions. There is no fixed architectural style, though the two minarets are characteristic of Mughal architecture. Historians attribute the change of architecture to the arrival of North Indian Muslims who settled there. The mosque houses the image of the Persian scholar Barool. It is believed that he came from Lucknow to educate the royal family. The chronogram written by Raja Makhhan Lal Bahdur Khirat, the Munshi of the Nawab, is found on the entrance of the prayer hall. There is a large temple tank to the north east of the sanctum and a large ground in front of it. Almost the entire portion of the mosque has an equivalent width of steps leading to it. To the west of the sanctum, the mausoleums of important people associated with the royal family are located.

== Culture ==
Big Mosque is the largest and considered the principal mosque in the city of Chennai. The mosque is an active place of worship. There is a constant flow of visitors in the mosque as it is located in one of the busiest places in Chennai. The mosque can accommodate thousands of devotees. During the sacred festivals of Bakrid and Ramzan, the devotees overflow, some of them offering prayers from the surrounding grounds. There was a proposal made by the administration to cover the open grounds at least during festive occasions to protect devotees from inclement weather conditions. There were contrasting views put forth by heritage enthusiasts who argued against roofing claiming the openness and the architecture would be hidden by the structure. The grave of Qaid-e-Millat M. Muhammad Ismail Sahib is situated in front of the mosque.

== See also ==
- Islam in India
- List of dargahs in Tamil Nadu
- List of mosques in India
