= Triplicane Labbai Jamaath Mosque =

Mosque in Chennai, Tamil Nadu, India

- திருவல்லிக்கேணி லெப்பை ஜமாஅத் பள்ளிவாசல்
- Location of the mosque in Chennai

Religion
- Affiliation: Sunni Islam
- Ecclesiastical or organizational status: Mosque
- Status: Active

Location
- Location: Triplicane, Chennai, Tamil Nadu
- Country: India
- Interactive map of Triplicane Labbai Jamaath Mosque
- Coordinates: 13°03′20″N 80°16′18″E

Architecture
- Type: Mosque architecture
- Completed: 1889

Specifications
- Dome: One
- Minaret: One

Website
- tljmasjid.com

The Triplicane Labbai Jamaath Mosque (Tamil: திருவல்லிக்கேணி லெப்பை ஜமாஅத் பள்ளிவாசல்) is a Sunni mosque located in the Triplicane neighbourhood of Chennai, in the state of Tamil Nadu, India. Constructed in 1889, major renovations have been planned. The mosque is situated on Mallan Ponnappa Mudali Street.

== See also ==
- Islam in India
- List of mosques in India
