= Krishnan =

Krishnan is a common name in South India, which refers to the Hindu deity Krishna. It is also combined with other names into a single name such as Ananthakrishnan, Balakrishnan, Gopalakrishnan, Jayakrishnan, Muralikrishnan, Ramakrishnan, Radhakrishnan, Unnikrishnan, and Venkatakrishnan.

Notable people with the name include:

- Kariamanickam Srinivasa Krishnan (1898–1961), Indian physicist who co-discovered Raman scattering with his mentor C. V. Raman
- M. S. Krishnan, Professor of Business Information Technology at the Ross School of Business, University of Michigan, Ann Arbor
- Madhaviah Krishnan (1912–1996), Indian naturalist, photographer and writer
- Maharajapuram Seetharaman Krishnan (geologist) (1898–1970), Indian geologist and geophysicist
- Nagercoil Sudalaimuthu Krishnan (1908–1957), Tamil film comedian
- Ramanathan Krishnan (born 1937), tennis player from Chennai
- Ramesh Krishnan (born 1961), tennis player from Chennai, son of Ramanathan Krishnan
- Ramya Krishnan (born 1967), South Indian film actor
- Trisha Krishnan, South Indian film actor
- Krishnan Guru-Murthy (born 1970), British journalist of Indian descent

== See also ==
- Krishna (disambiguation)
