= Unnikrishnan =

- Gender: Male
- Language: Malayalam

Origin
- Meaning: Infant form of Lord Krishna
- Region of origin: Kerala, India

Other names
- Variant form: Unnikannan
- Nicknames: Unni; Krishnan; UK
- Related names: Balakrishnan; Unni; Krishnan

Unnikrishnan is a Hindu name commonly used in the Indian state of Kerala. Unnikrishnan refers to the infant form of the Hindu deity Krishna. The following is list of people named Unnikrishnan:

Given name

- Unnikrishnan Manukrishnan (born 1988), Indian cricketer
- Unnikrishnan Namboothiri (1923–2021), Indian Malayalam actor
- Unnikrishnan Puthur (1933–2014), Malayalam–language novelist and short story writer
- Unnikrishnan Thiruvazhiyode (born 1942), Indian civil servant and Malayalam language novelist

Surname

- B. Unnikrishnan (born Unnikrishnan Bhaskaran Pillai in 1970), Indian film director and screenwriter
- K.P. Unnikrishnan (1936–2026), Indian politician
- Oduvil Unnikrishnan (1944–2006), Indian film actor
- P. Unnikrishnan (born 1966), Indian Carnatic vocalist and playback singer
- Roopa Unnikrishnan, Indian-born American sports shooter
- Sandeep Unnikrishnan (1977–2008), Indian military officer
- Vallathol Unnikrishnan, Indian Malayalam actor
- Vishnu Unnikrishnan, Malayalam actor and script writer
- Uthara Unnikrishnan (born 2004), Indian playback singer
- C. S. Unnikrishnan (born 1962), Indian physicist and professor
