= Ettampadai Temple =

Ettampadai
- எட்டாம்படை திருவல்லிக்கேணி திருமுருகன்

Religion
- Affiliation: Hinduism
- District: Chennai
- Deity: Ettampadai Thiruvallikkeni Thirumurugan (Murugan)

Location
- Location: Thiruvallikkeni
- State: Tamil Nadu
- Country: India
- Interactive map of Ettampadai
- Coordinates: 13.051514°N 80.275124°E

Architecture
- Established: 1845

The Ettampadai (Tamil: எட்டாம்படை) is a temple of Lord Murugan (Subrahmanya) in India, located in the neighbourhood of Triplicane (Thiruvallikkeni) in Chennai.

== History ==
The idol of Lord Muruga of this temple is placed in the Kandhaswamy temple and Thiruporoor Murugan Temple. In the early days pilgrims carrying the Kavadi.

The land for the temple construction was donated by a woman named Pachayammal. To restructure this temple, Thiruvallikkeni Thirumuruganadiyargal, the local devotees of Lord Muruga, started a devotional musical organization called "Bhajaneshwara" in 1978. From the remuneration they received, the initial structure of this temple was restructured.

== The Temple ==
The Ettampadai temple is the eighth Padaiveedu of Lord Muruga. In the first inner prakāram are the shrines of deities, namely, Pillayar, Kumbeshwara, Ambigai, and Sri Kanaga Durga. The Navagraha Sannidhi is beside the Ancient Pillar of Lord Muruga.

== Festivals ==
Besides regular services, days sacred to the Lord Muruga are celebrated in a grand way every year and are attended by thousands of devotees from all over South India. Some of these festivals are the Thai-Poosam, the Vaikhashi-Vishakham and the Soora-Samharam.

Panguni Utthiram festival is the most famous festival at temple. The six-day celebration includes homams, devotional music, nadhaswaram concert, kavadiattam, special abhishekam and annadhanam on the festival.

Pilgrims after first having taken a strict vow of abstinence, come barefoot, by walk, from distant towns and villages. Many pilgrims also bring a litter of wood, called a Kāvadi, borne on their shoulders, in commemoration of the act of the demon Hidumba who is credited by legend with bringing the two hills of Palani to their present location, slung upon his shoulders in a similar fashion. Others bring pots of sanctified water, known as theertha-kāvadi, for the priests to conduct the abhishekam on the holy day.

== Poojas ==
Darshan hours are from 6:00 a.m. to 12.00 p.m. and 4.30 p.m. to 8.00 p.m. On festival days the temple opens at 4.30 a.m. and remains open till 10.30 p.m.

== Annual festivals ==
- Kandha Shashti
- Vaigaasi Visagam
- Seshadri Swaamigal Jayanthi
- Panguni Utthira Peru Vizhaa - 25th Year Celebration (28–31 March 2010)

== See also ==
- Murugan
- Panguni Uthiram
