= Triplicane Urban Co-Operative Society =

Cooperative Society

The Triplicane Urban Cooperative Society (TUCS) was started on 1904 in Triplicane, a neighbourhood of Chennai. It was the first consumer cooperative society in India. As of 2004, the society owned 40 buildings including 8000 Sq. ft. of departmental stores and storage space in Anna Salai.
