= Parthasarathy Temple, Chennai =

Temple in India

Parthasarathy Perumal Temple
- Thiruvallikēñi Venkatakrishna Parathasarathy Perumal Thirukoil
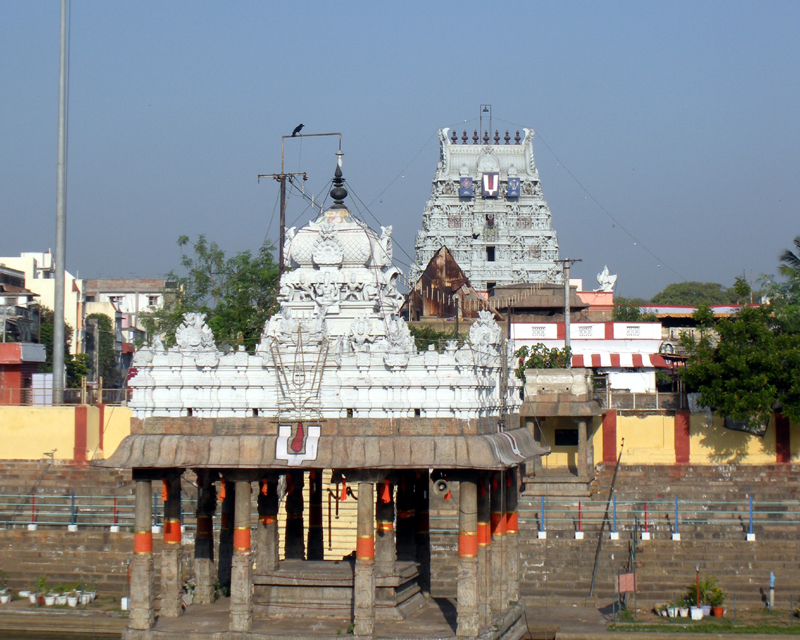

- Parthasarathy Temple, Triplicane, Chennai, Tamil Nadu

Religion
- Affiliation: Hinduism
- District: Chennai
- Deity: Sri Venkatakrishnan (Moolavar), Sri Parthasarathy (Urchavar); Sri Vedavalli Thaayar
- Festivals: Panguni Serthi, Pallava Utsavam, Ramanujar Utsavam, Vaikunda Ekadashi, Every Friday Sri Vedavalli Thayar Purappadu

Location
- Location: Thiruvallikeni
- State: Tamil Nadu
- Country: India
- Coordinates: 13.05395°N 80.27675°E

Architecture
- Type: Dravidian architecture
- Creator: Pallavas
- Completed: 6th century AD

The Parthasarathy Temple is a 6th-century Hindu Vaishnavite temple dedicated to Vishnu in Chennai, India. Located in the neighbourhood of Thiruvallikeni, the temple is glorified in the Naalayira Divya Prabandham, the early medieval Tamil literature canon of the Alvar saints from the 6th to 9th centuries CE and is classified as among the 108 Divya Desams dedicated to Vishnu. The name 'Parthasarathy' means the 'charioteer of Arjuna', referring to Krishna's role as a charioteer to Arjuna in the epic Mahabharata.

It was originally built by the Pallavas in the 6th century by king Narasimhavarman I. The temple has icons of five forms of Vishnu: Yoga Narasimha, Rama, Gajendra Varadaraja, Ranganatha, and Krishna as Parthasarathy. The temple is one of the oldest structures in Chennai. There are shrines for Vedavalli Thayar, Ranganatha, Rama, Gajendra Varadar, Narasimha, Andal, Hanuman, Alvars, Ramanuja, Swami Manavala Mamunigal and Vedanthachariar. The temple subscribes to Vaikhanasa agama and follows Tenkalai tradition. There are separate entrances and dhvajastambhas for the Parthasarathy and Yoga Narasimha temples. The gopuram (towers) and mandapas (pillars) are decorated with elaborate carvings, a standard feature of South Indian Temple Architecture.

The temple and its surrounding neighbourhood belong to the Tenkalai subtradition of South Indian Sri Vaishnavism, and control of the temple has long been contested between its Tenkalai community and the state. Conflicts between the Tenkalai subsect at Triplicane and the government of Madras over the temple's management continued into the second half of the twentieth century.

== Legend ==
As per Hindu legend, the Saptarishis, the seven sages worshipped five deities Panchaveeras, namely, Venkata Krishnaswamy, Rukmini, Satyaki, Balarama, Pradyumna, and Aniruddha. As per the Mahabharata, Vishnu, in his avatar as Krishna was acting as charioteer for Arjuna, the Pandava prince during the war with Kauravas. Krishna did not take any weapons during the war. During the fight between Arjuna and Bhishma, Krishna was injured by the arrow from Bhishma. The mark in the image in the temple is believed to follow the legend. The place is called Allikeni, meaning a pond of lily as it is believed that historically the place was full of lily ponds. The place is the only place where the presiding deity is sported with a moustache. As per another legend, the place was once a tulasi forest. A Chola king named Sumati wanted to see Vishnu in the form of Parthasarathy and prayed at Srinivasa temple in Tirupati. Srinivasa directed the king to visit the temple here built by sage Atreya and worshipped with another sage called Sumati.

== History ==
The temple was originally built by the Pallavas Between the 6th and 8th century, subsequently expanded by Cholas and later by the Vijayanagara kings in the 15th century. The temple has several inscriptions dating from the 8th century in Tamil presumably from the period of Dantivarman, who was a Vishnu devotee. Thirumangai Alvar, the 8th-century poet-saint also attributes the building of temple to the Pallava king. From the internal references of the temple, it appears that the temple was restored during 1564 CE when new shrines were built. In later years, endowments of villages and gardens have enriched the temple. The temple also has inscriptions about the Pallava king, Nandivarman of the 8th Century. One of the earliest Alvars Pey Alvar (who lived between 5th and 6th Century) has mentioned this temple which makes the temple the oldest structure in Chennai.

The temple was extensively built during the Chola period and a lot of inscriptions dating back to the same period are found here. The outer most mandapam is replete with sculptures of various forms of Vishnu, especially the avatars. One can also see inscriptions of Dantivarma Pallava of the 8th century, Chola and Vijayanagara in the temple. The first architectural expansion of the temple took place during the reign of the Pallavas (Tondaiyar Kon) as vividly described by Tirumangai Alvar. Reminiscent of this is the inscription of the Pallava King Dantivarman (796–847 CE), which is preserved in the temple.

The temple witnessed a major expansion during the rule of the Vijayanagara kings like Sadasiva Raya, Sriranga Raya and Venkatapati Raya II (16th century). Many subshrines and pillared pavilions (mandapas) like the Tiruvaymoli Mandapa were added.

A Pallava king built the present temple in the eighth century. The gopuram was also built by a Pallava king - Tondaiman Chakravarthy. There are inscriptions that record the contributions of the Chola kings Raja Raja and Kulottunga III, Pandya King Maravarman and many rulers of the Vijayanagara dynasty including Ramaraja Venkatapathiraja and Vira Venkatapathy. For a while the East India Company administered the temple.

The pushkarani is called Kairavani and five sacred teerthams are believed to surround the tank – Indra, Soma, Agni, Meena and Vishnu. Seven rishis – Bhrigu, Atri, Marichi, Markandeya, Sumati, Saptaroma and Jabali – performed penance here. All five deities in the temple have been extolled by Tirumangai Alvar. There is also a separate shrine for Andal, one of the 12 Alvars who is also considered as a consort to the presiding deity.

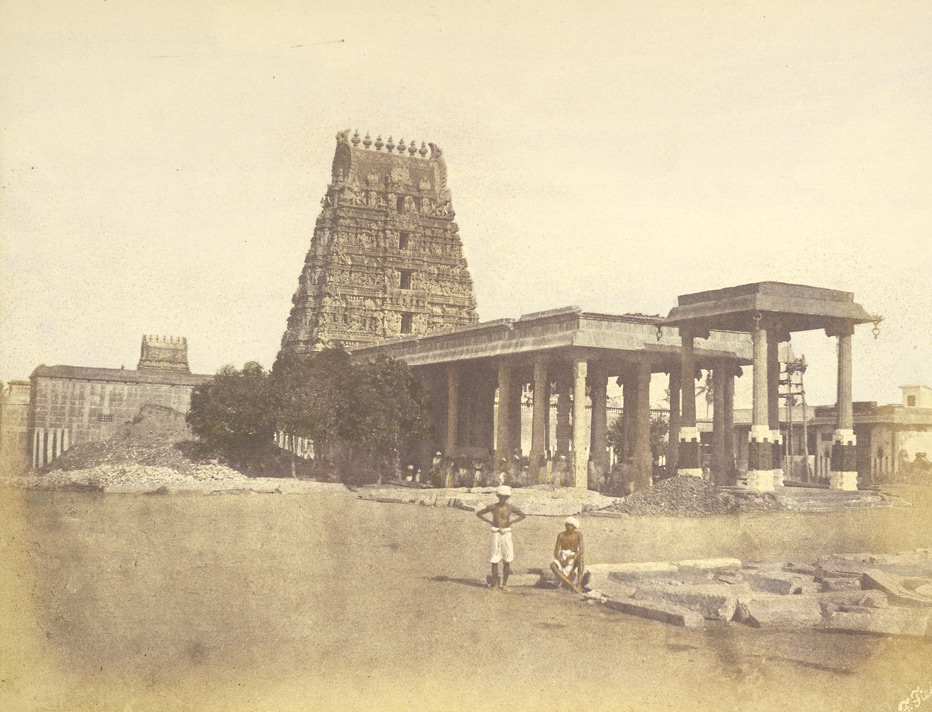
The temple in 1851

It is one of the very few shrines in the country dedicated to Krishna as Parthasarathy, charioteer of Arjuna and to contains idols of three avatars of Vishnu: Narasimha, Rama, and Krishna.

Unusually, he is depicted with a prominent moustache and carries a conch in his hand. Also unusual is the iconographical combination found in the sanctum. Here, Krishna is seen standing with consort Rukmini, elder brother Balarama, son Pradyumna, grandson Aniruddha and Satyaki. Because of the association of the temple with Krishna, Tiruvallikeni came to be regarded as the Southern Vrindavana. He also mentioned about the Telliya Singar shrine within the temple.

The temple is maintained and administered by the Hindu Religious and Charitable Endowments Department of the Government of Tamil Nadu.

=== Sectarian conflict and Company rule, 1700–1842 ===
Through the eighteenth century, de facto Tenkalai control of the temple rested substantially on the sympathies of the native merchants and brokers (dubashes) who held the Triplicane temple as part of the perquisites of their offices in the colonial economy, a pattern inaugurated in the 1670s when the village was leased to Kasi Viranna, the East India Company's chief native merchant. Appadurai argues that these merchant-brokers occupied a role created by the eclipse of indigenous kingship and the Company's reluctant and ambiguous posture towards the temple: where Vijayanagara-era sectarian leaders had been beneficiaries of an active transactional relationship between king and deity, their colonial successors operated amid confused arbitration and a passive relationship between the deity and the governing power.

After the formation of the Board of Revenue in 1789 and the centralisation of temple revenue collection in 1796, the temple came under the direct supervision of the Collector of Madras, who reported to the Board. In 1799 the Board received a petition against the dharmakarta (manager) alleging misappropriation of temple revenues; an inquiry by the Board's Tamil translator concluded that the embezzlement charges were largely empty and that the substantive grievance concerned rights to shares in the redistributed offerings of the deity. The Board referred the matter to a native committee, whose Rules and Regulations of 1800 it then ratified. Appadurai reads such accusations of embezzlement as a code in which conflicts over honours (mariyātai) and shares could be made legible to a colonial administration that was receptive to charges of financial impropriety but reluctant to arbitrate matters it classified as religious.

Regulation VII of 1817, the first explicit English legislation on temple management, was read by the Board as warranting only a supervisory role, and in 1821 it directed the Collector to withdraw from interference in the Madras temples. The Company's decision in 1842 to end its patronage of native religious institutions completed this withdrawal, and thereafter the dominant external force in the temple's affairs was the Anglo-Indian judiciary rather than the revenue bureaucracy — a shift Appadurai attributes to the separation of executive and judicial power under British rule and to British officials' unwillingness to arbitrate temple disputes.

== Religious traditions ==
The temple is administered by the Hindu Religious and Charitable Endowments Department of the Government of Tamil Nadu. The temple follows the traditions of the Thenkalai sect of Vaishnavite tradition and follows the Vaikhanasa Agama. The temple has grand brahmotsavams (big festival) for Parthasarathy during the Tamil month of Chittirai (April–May), on the same month Udayavar utsavam is also celebrated.

As per Sri Pillailogam Jeeyar Swamy in his work "Ramanuja Divya Charithai" it is stated that Sri Asoori Kesava Somayaji, father of Ramanuja, performed Putrakaameshti Yagam at Kairavini the temple pond at Thiruvallikeni, and prayed to Parthasarathy to bless him with a son. Parthasarathy appeared in the dreams of Sri Asoori Kesava Somayaji and promised he will be born as his son to impart teachings of his Gita for the benefit of mankind. The Bhagavad Gita Bhāshya (a review and commentary on the Bhagavad Gita), was later written by Ramanuja. In conformity of the above tradition during the annual festival, unlike other Alvars and acharyas, Ramanuja has independent processions both in the morning and evening.

In the month of Vaikasi, the occasions of Sri Varadarajar utsavam, Sri Nammalvar utsavam (vaikasi-vishakam), and Vasantotsavam are celebrated, while Aḻagiyasingar (Narasimha) is venerated during the Tamil month of Ani (June–July). There are also festivals for Ramanuja (April–May) and Manavala Mamunigal (Oct-Nov) besides festivals for Alvars and acharyas. The occasion of Vaikuntha Ekadashi during the Tamil month of Margaḻi (December–January) draws a lot of pilgrims.

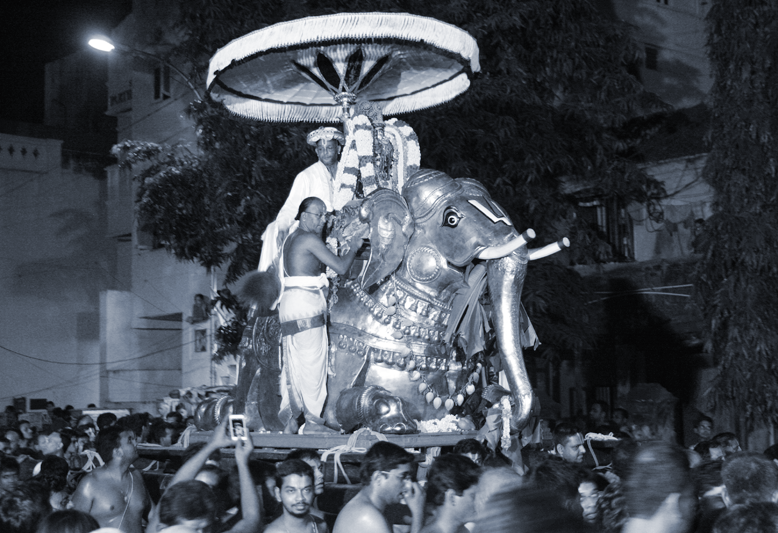
Parthasarathy Perumal Yaanai Vahanam

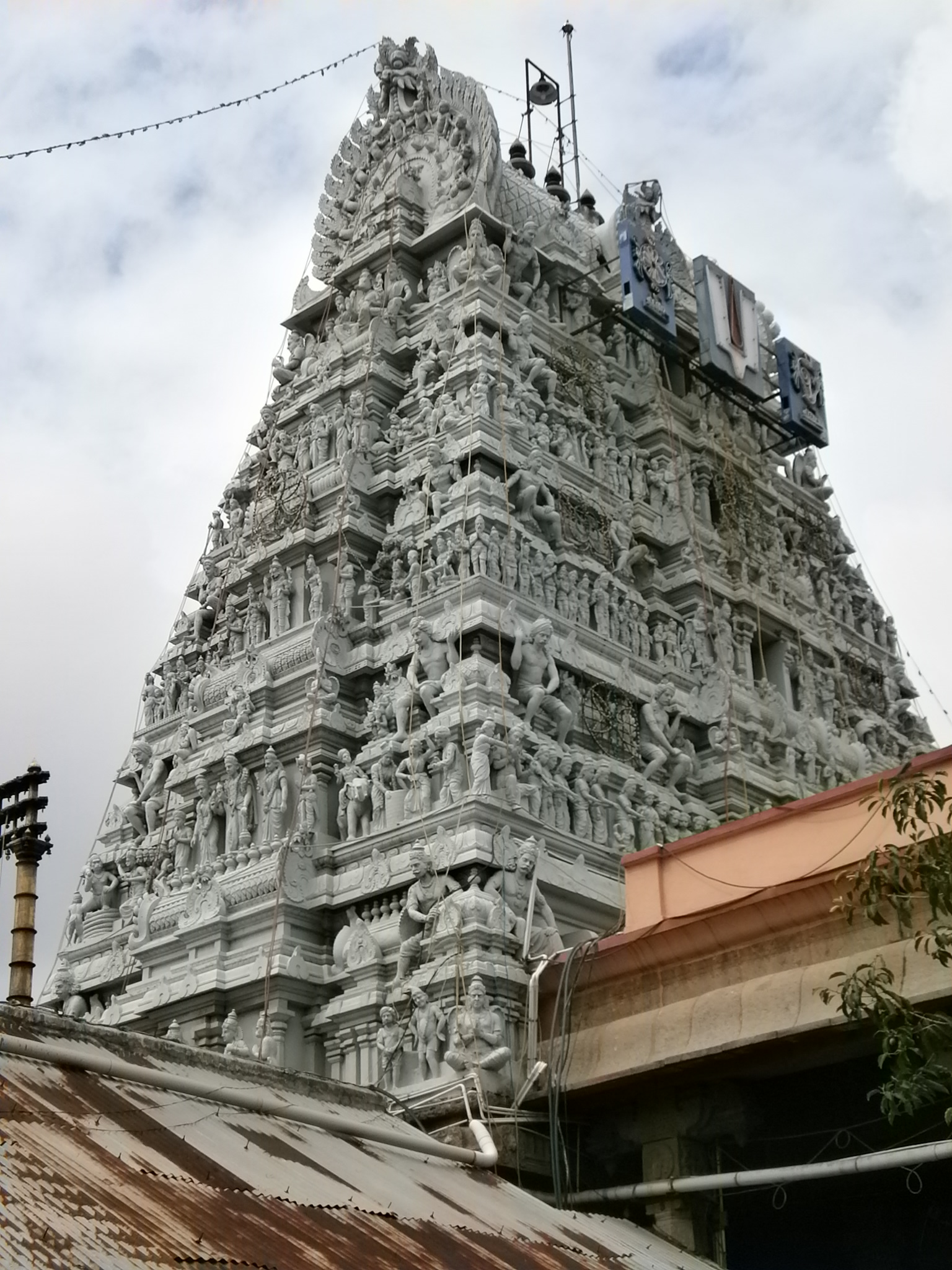
The temple's tower

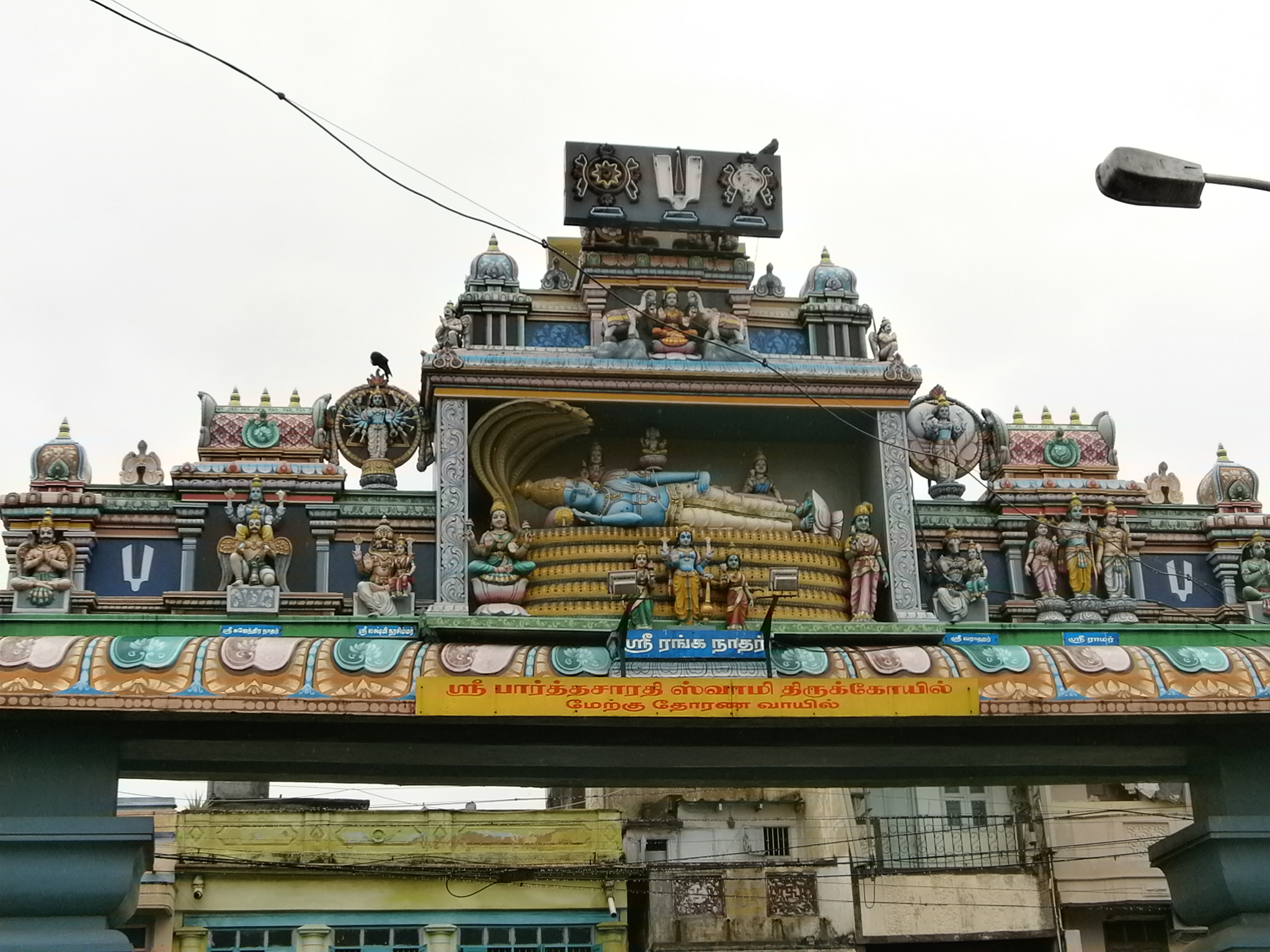
Ranganathar statue on an entrance arch

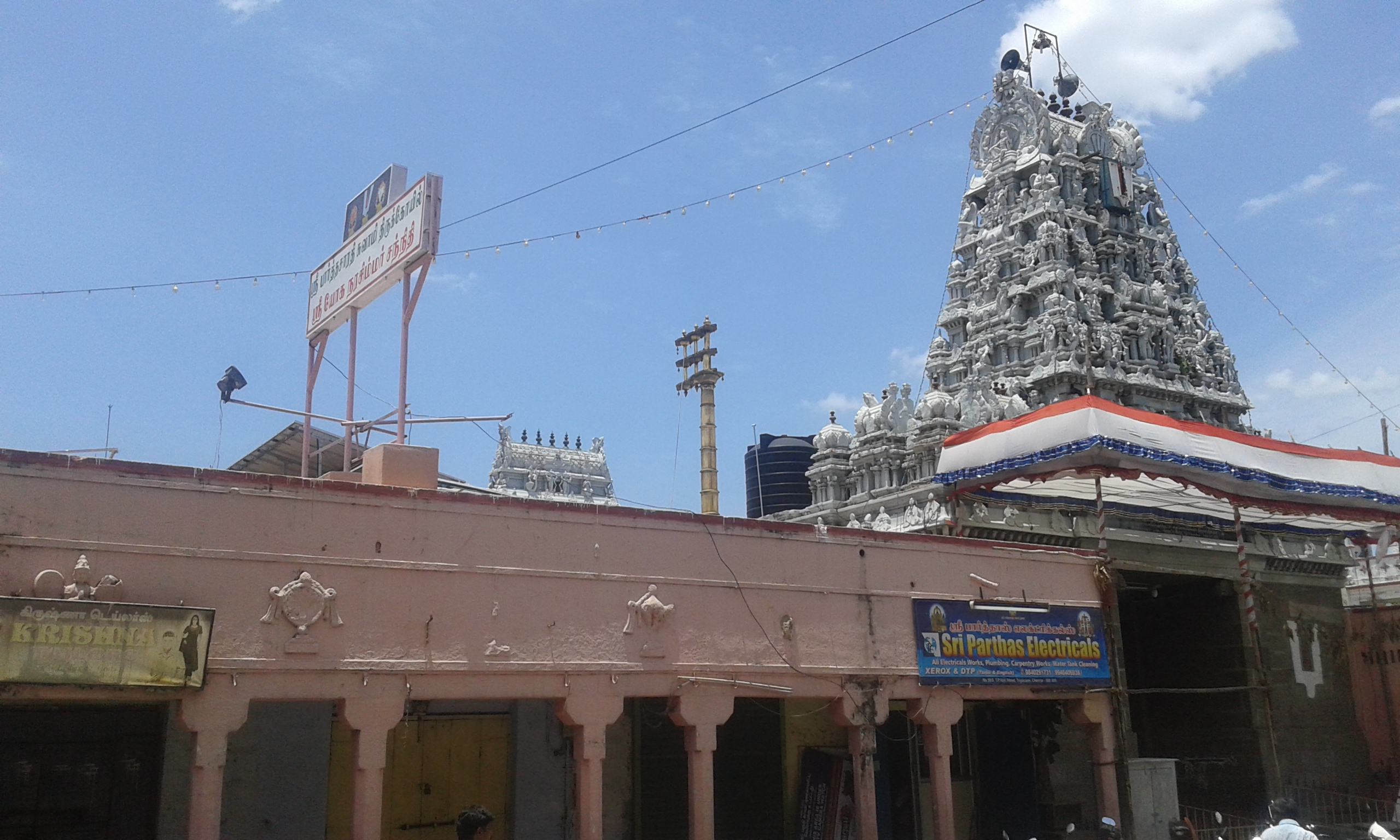
Western entrance to the temple

=== Utsavams ===
Utsavams take place around the year in Parthasarathy temple. Urchavams (or utsavams), as these are termed, take place for a particular god at a particular period of time in the year. It is a religious practise to carry the different gods of the temple through the mada veethis of triplicane during some of these festivals. The Gods will move in different religiously built temple vehicles (vaghanams, as these are termed in Tamil), like Elephant, Garuda, Horse, Yali (a mythical animal), Hamsa (Swan), Hanuman, temple Rath (ther in Tamil, chariot or Ratham, alternative terms), etc.

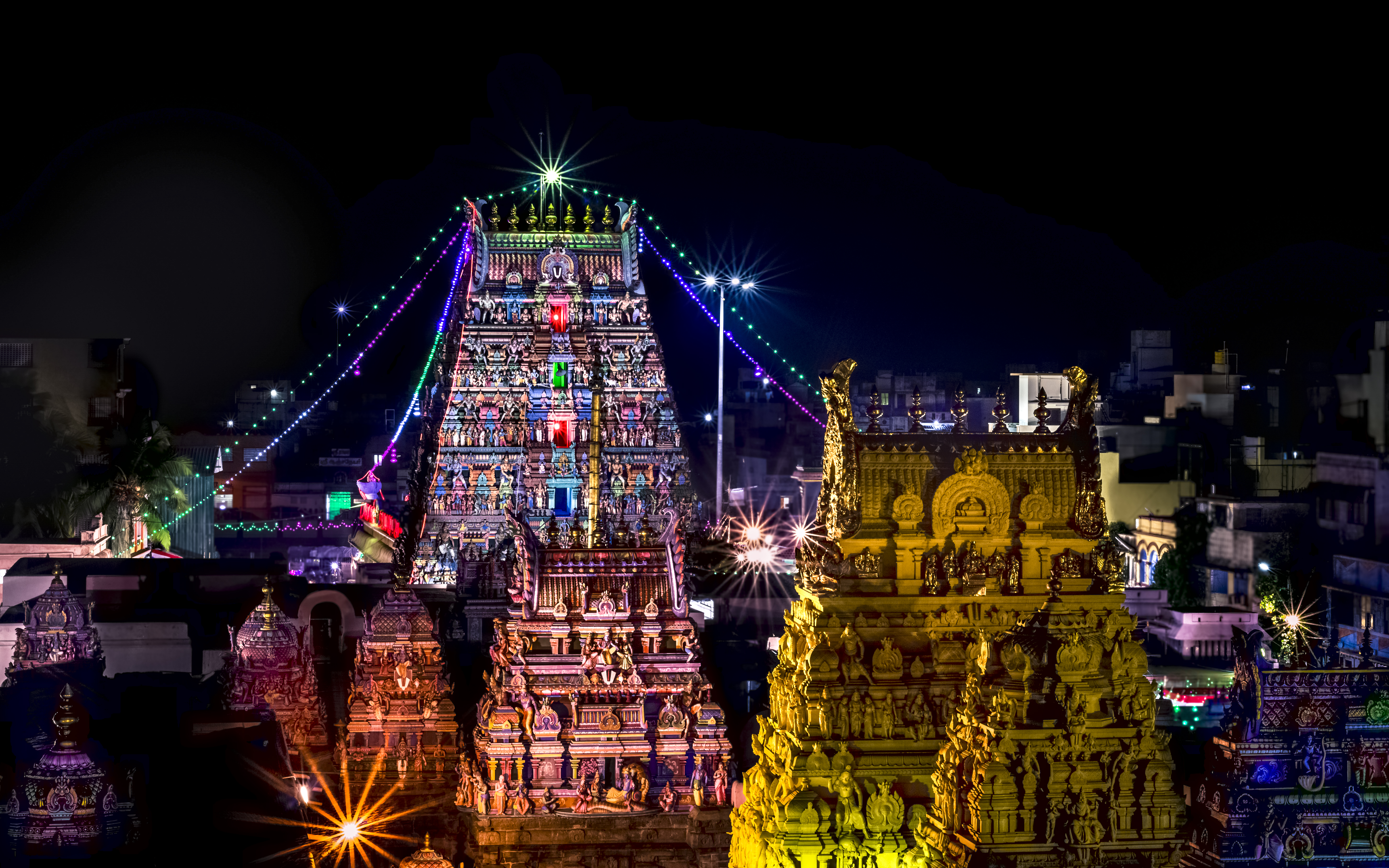
Parthasarathy Temple during Sri Vaikunda Ekaadasi festival

The following are the various festivals or utsavams in the Parthasarathy temple in different parts of the Tamil Calendar year. During festival days the place is given a new look and accompanied by various traditional rites.

Traditional Tamil calendar month (Gregorian calendar months)	Festival
Chittirai (April–May)	Sri Brahma Utsavam (Brahmotsavam) Sri Udaiyar's Utsavam and Vidaiyatri
Vaikasi (May–June)	Vasantotsavam Sri Gajendra Varadaraja Swami Utsavam Sri Ranganatha-Sri Vedavalli Tayar Utsavam
Ani (June–July)	Sri Narasimha Swami Brahmotsavam Kodai Utsavam
Adi (July–August)	Sri Gajendra Moksham Sri Parthasarathy Jyeshtabishekam Tiru Pavadai Utsavam Tiru Adi Puram Jyeshtabhishekam
Avani (August–September)	Pavitrotsavam Krishna Jayanti (Krishna Janmashtami)
Puratasi (September–October)	Navaratri Vedavalli Tayar Laksharachana
Aippasi (October–November)	Manavala Mamunigal Utsavam Deepavali Anna kuda utsavam
Kartikai (November–December)	Kartikai Deepam Taila Kapu
Margaḻi (December–January)	Margaḻi Pagal Pattu Vaikuntha Ekadashi Ra Pattu
Tai (January–February)	Laksharachana of Parthasarathy Rathasaptami Festival to Ekkatuthangal
Masi (February–March)	Masi Magam Teppam or Teppotsavam Dhavana Utsavam
Panguni (March–April)	Panguni Uttiram Rama Navami

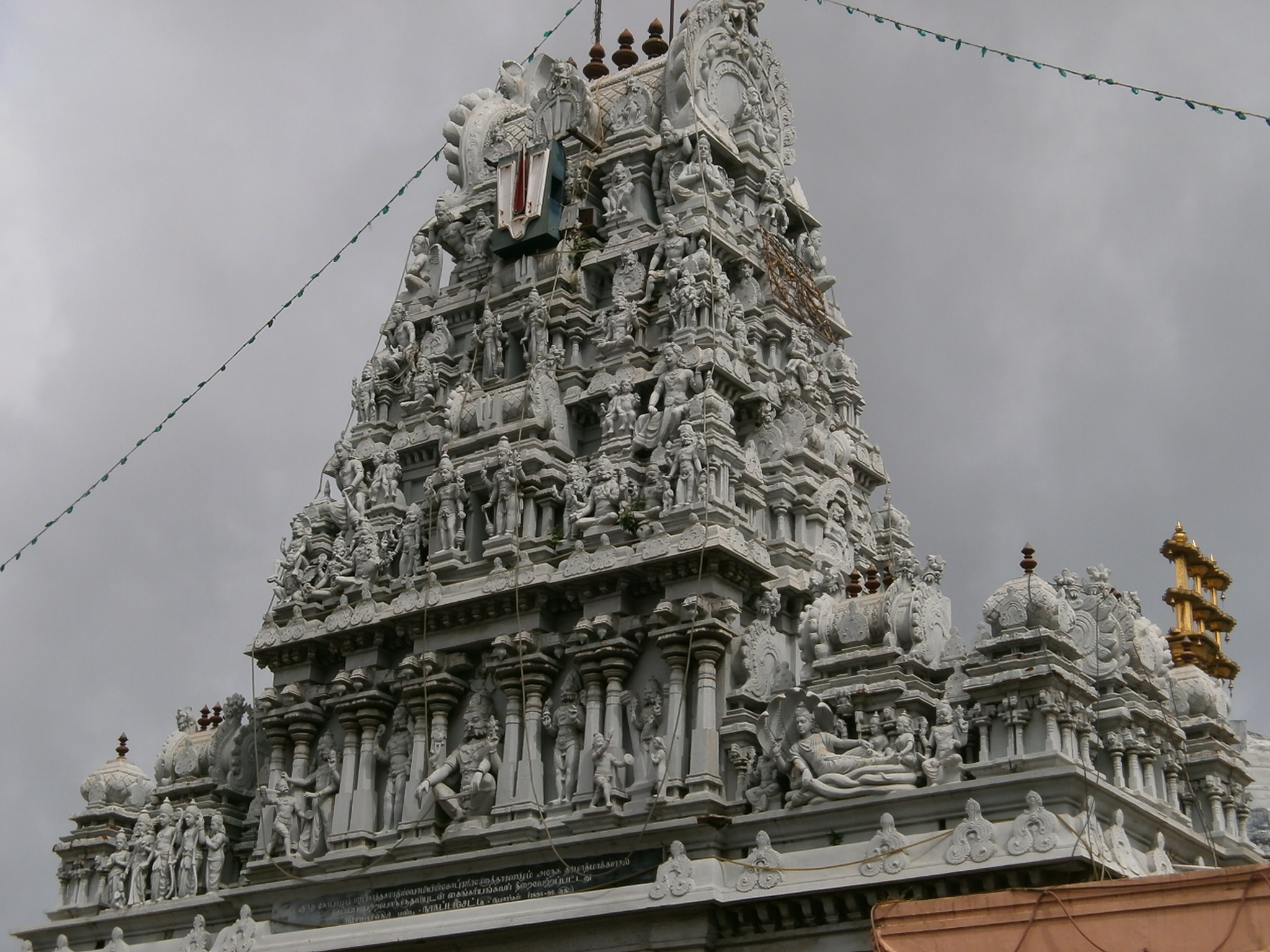
Statues on the gopuram

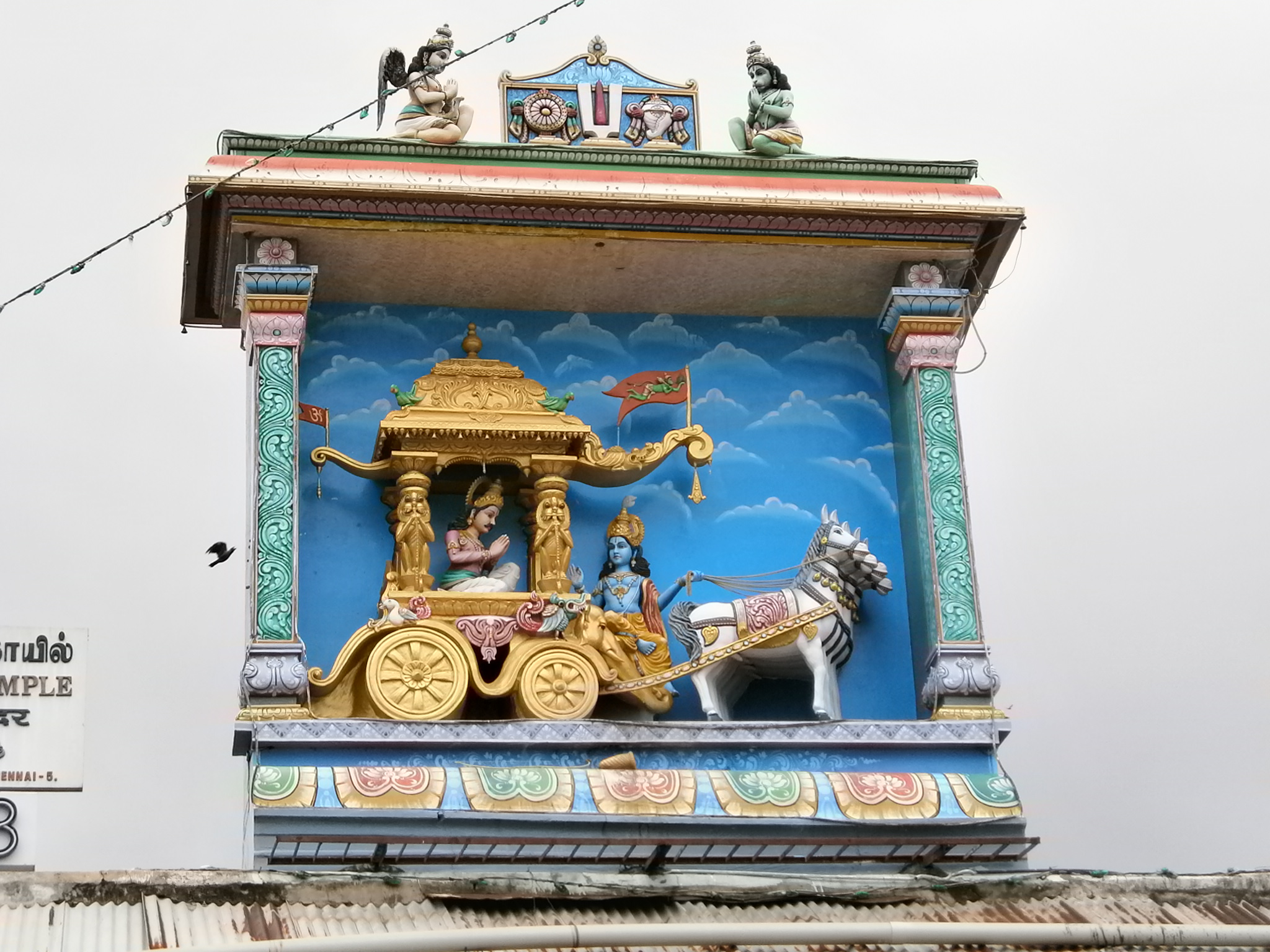
Statue depicting Krishna as Arjuna's charioteer

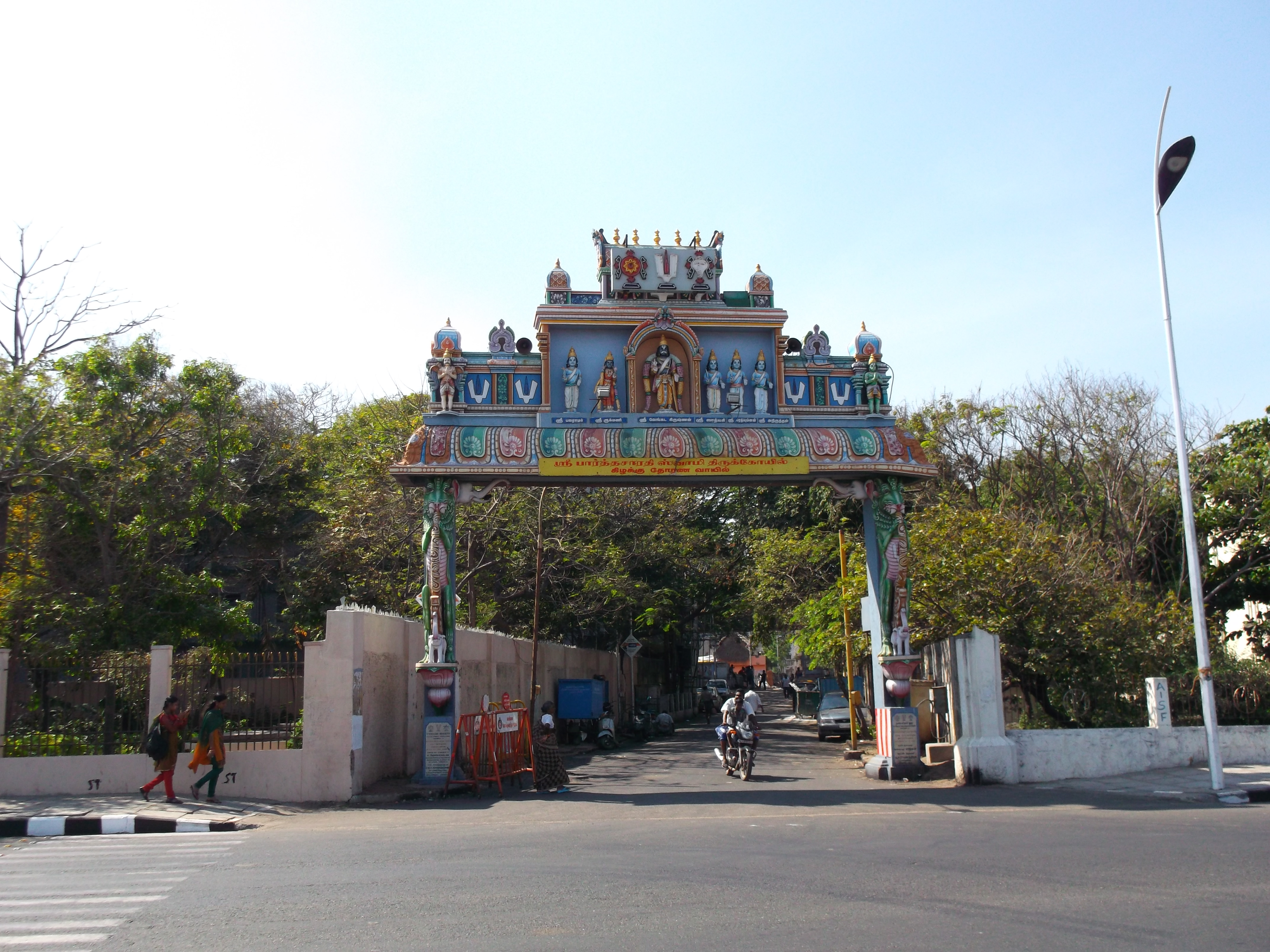
Eastern entrance arch near the coast on Beach Road

The most important among these festivals are the Vaikunda Ekadesi – as huge crowds from not only chennai, but also various parts of Tamil Nadu and India come to the temple on this day; Theppam or Thepotsavam – the colourful float festival, and the utsavam for the main deity Parthasarathy.

==== Theppam (Float) festival ====
Also known Teppothsavam (Theppam + Utsavam), this festival takes place on 7 days in the Tamil month of masi, 3 days for Parthasarathy, one each for Sri Narasimhar, Sri Ranganathar, Sri Ramar and Sri Gajendra Varadhar. The seven-day event attracts a large number of devotees and onlookers from different parts of Chennai and Tamil Nadu.

A floating structure made up of drums, timber would be constructed and would be beautifully decorated with lights, flowers, religious paintings, silken buntings, etc. which serves as a visual delight. For better ambience, lights were also installed in the garden around the tank and additionally, focus lights were placed on the corners of the Neerazhi Mandapam (the Mandapam (structure) in the Center of the temple tank). Perumal (God) would come to the temple tank in Purappadu (departure) and be placed majestically inside the float. On all the days, the float completed five rounds around the Neerazhi Mandapam. After this, the deities were taken in a procession around the four Mada Streets.

Devotees in hundreds would converge and sit on the steps of the temple tank to have Darshan of the Lord on Theppam. The specialty of the third-day function is the 'Thirumanjanam', performed to the deity inside the float. Other than the bhattachariars (temple priests), no one is allowed inside the float. A Rescue team of about 10 swimmers is usually provided by the Tamil Nadu Fire and Rescue Services.

This theppam festival showcases one of Triplicane's most distinctive cultural traditions, a practice found nowhere else in Chennai apart from Mylapore.

== Incidents ==
The temple had internal conflict from the 1750s till the end of the century between the two subsects of Sri Vaishnavism, namely Tenkalai and Vadakalai. The two sects were grounded over the right of reciting each of their own version of concluding verses in the temple. A petition was received by the ruling British government to decide the religious dispute. English records mention petition during the year 1754 filed by local inhabitants and merchants seeking to resolve the dispute. They suggested that the Tenkalai Brahmins could recite their Srisailesadayaptram in the Parthasarathi shrine, while the Vadakalai Brahmins could recite their Ramanujadayapatram in the Telinga Singar shrine. The council agreed that the suggestion in the petition be accepted and publicly announced. There were further petitions in 1780 from the Tenkalai Brahmins that since the temple was built, recitals were made only in Srisailesadayaptram, which should continue. It also asserted that the trustee Manali Muthukrishna Mudali favoured Vadakalai resulting in the issue. While both the sects were claiming theirs should be the practice followed in the temple, the English administrators in India has deep rooted belief that old ways were the only solution to preserve tranquility. The Tenkalai sect had the sanction of antiquity and custom resulting in Tenkalai gaining precedence.

The bearers at the temple were traditionally fishermen of Triplicane. During the temple festivities, they carry the festival idol in their sturdy shoulders in an atmosphere of wine and toddy shops. They bargained for additional rights in the temple in 1928, which eventually ended their ties with the temple.

Muthuswami Dikshitar, composer of Indian classical music, who is considered one of the musical Trinity of Carnatic music composed the song "Shri Parthasarathina pAlitOsmyaham" on this Kshethram.

Bharathiar, the Tamil poet and independence activist was struck by an elephant at the temple, whom he used to feed regularly. Although he survived the incident, a few months later his health deteriorated and he died.

Swami Vivekananda, an Indian Hindu monk was a devotee of Parthasarathy. In one of his letters in the year 1893 to his disciple Alasinga, he writes 'Take a bow before Parthasarathy of Thiruvallikeni and give an undertaking before Him of a great sacrifice, one of a whole life for the poor, the lowly and the oppressed – for whom Parthasarathy comes from time to time and whom he loves above all.' You can find this letter to his disciple inscribed in one of the walls at temple corridor.

== See also ==
- Kapaleeshwarar Temple
- Religion in Chennai
- Heritage structures in Chennai
