= Triplicane =

Neighborhood in Chennai, India

Triplicane Thiruvallikeni
- Neighbourhood
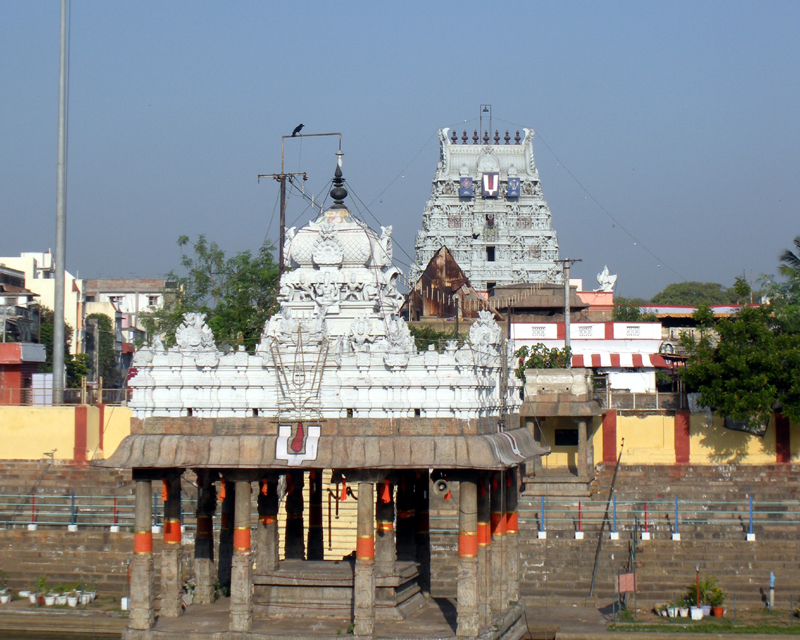
- Triplicane Pond and Parthasarthy temple Gopuram

- Location within Chennai Location within Tamil Nadu Location within India
- Coordinates: 13.0588°N 80.2756°E
- Country: India
- State: Tamil Nadu
- District: Chennai
- Metro: Chennai
- Talukas: Mylapore-Triplicane

Government
  - Body: Chennai Corporation
- Elevation: 54 m (177 ft)

Languages
  - Official: Tamil
- Time zone: UTC+5:30 (IST)
- Postal code: 600005
- Vehicle registration: TN-06
- Lok Sabha constituency: Chennai Central
- Planning agency: CMDA
- Civic agency: Chennai Corporation
- Vidhan Sabha constituency: Chepauk-Thiruvallikeni Assembly constituency
- Website: www.chennai.tn.nic.in

Thiruvallikeni, also known as Triplicane, is one of the oldest neighbourhoods of Chennai, India. It is situated on the Bay of Bengal coast and about 0.6 km (0.37 mi) from Fort St George. The average elevation of the neighbourhood is 14 metres above sea level.

Along with Mylapore and the surrounding regions, Triplicane is historically much older than the city of Chennai itself, with a mention in records as early as the Pallava period. One of the four "Old Towns" in the city, the neighbourhood was the first village obtained by the English to expand the new city of Madras beyond its "White Town" neighbourhood within the Fort St. George. It is the location of Marina Beach and Parthasarathy Temple.

== Etymology ==
The name Triplicane is the anglicized version of Thiruvallikeni, which derives from Thiru-Alli-Keni ('Sacred Lily Pond' in Tamil), denoting the pond in front of the Parthasarathy temple, which was amidst a big Tulasi forest. The place is also referred as Brindaranyam in Brahmanda Purana, owing to the presence of the tulasi (brinda) plants in the area.

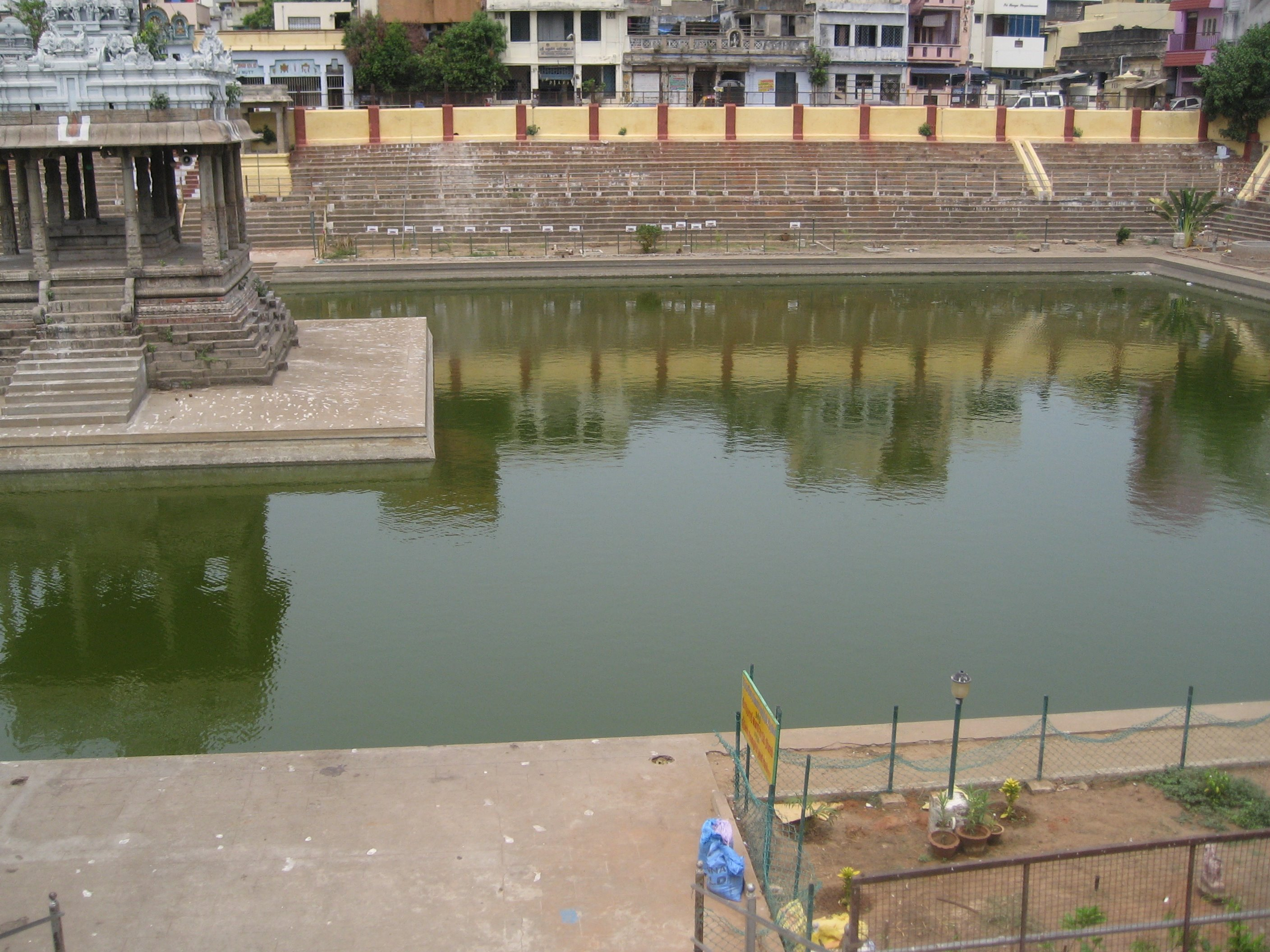
Triplicane pond

== History ==
=== Literary mention ===
The early records of the town are rooted to epic rather than history. The city's original name, Thiruvallikeni, finds various mentions in the Nalayira Divya Prabandham, which are a collection of hymns by earlier poets that were compiled in the ninth century. One such poet, Thirumangai Alvar, described Thiruvallikeni as a densely canopied forest with peacocks and koels, where the sun's rays could not penetrate. Another poet, Peyalwar, describes Thiruvallikeni as being "by the tossing sea... where corals and pearls washed ashore liken the evening sky and the lamps they light of dusk."

=== Medieval era ===
The evidence from stone inscriptions indicates that Parthasarathy temple was built in the eighth century by a Pallava King. The temple was later expanded under the Pallavas, Cholas, Vijayanagara rulers. It has been recorded that a rivulet, Kaivareni, ran across Triplicane and Mylapore. The legend has it that the rivulet connected two water bodies: the temple tank of Parthasarathy temple and a sacred well, Mani Kairavani, in the flower garden of Adi Kesava Perumal temple of Mylapore. It is believed that Peyalvar, one of the 12 alvars, was born on a lily flower in this well and that he sailed through the rivulet to worship Lord Krishna in the Parthasarathy temple. To commemorate this, the idol of Peyalwar in Mylapore is brought, as a procession, to Parthasarathy temple every year in the month of September. The Peyalwar Temple was built in the 13th century.

=== British era ===
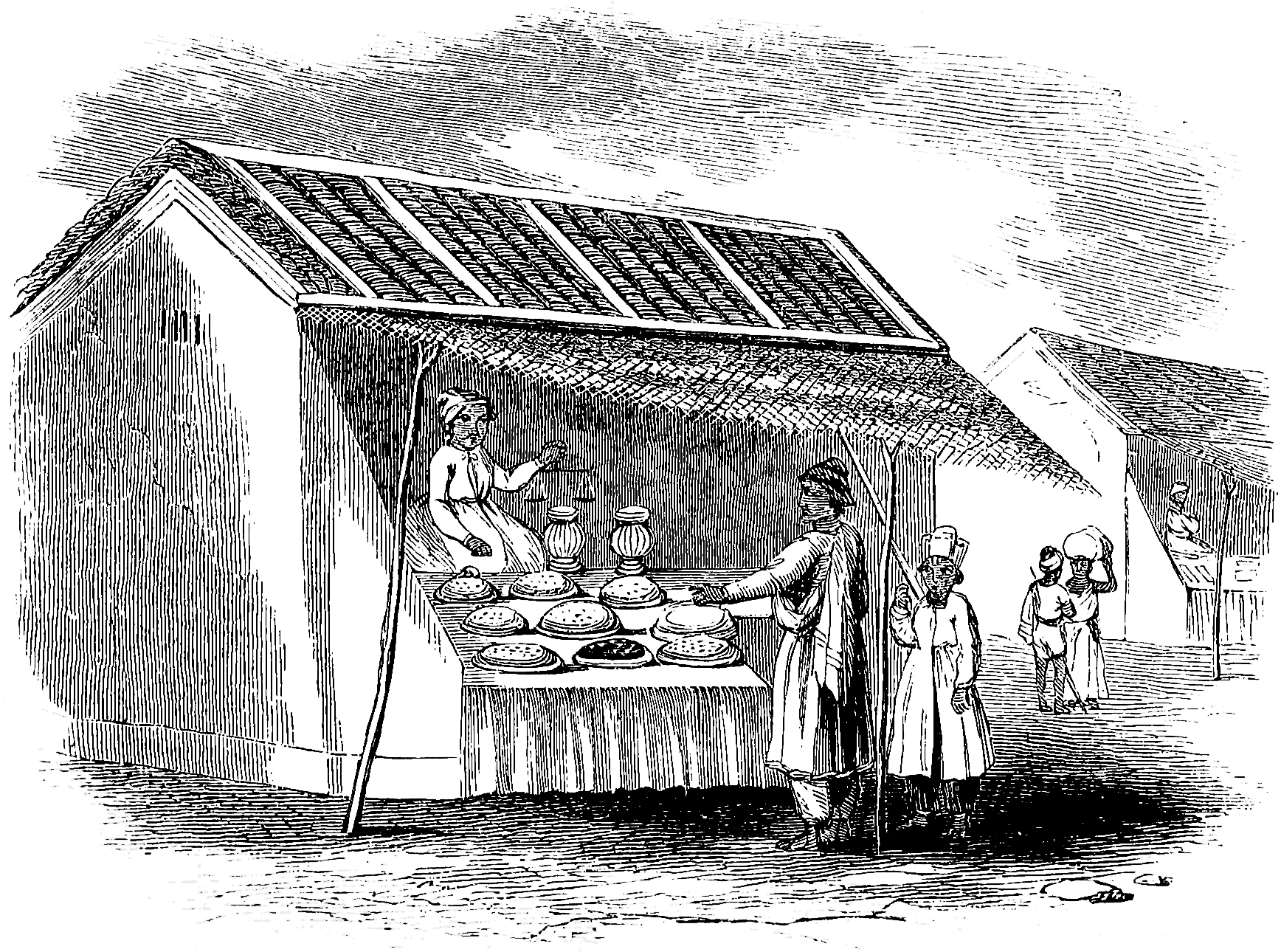
Bazzar in Triplicane. Illustration in 1855

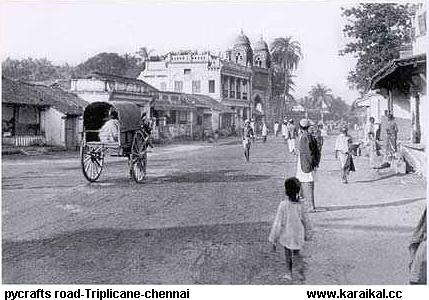
Triplicane Pycrofts Road in 1906

In the 1600s, Triplicane was a separate village from Madras. After about a century, the British found Triplicane to be a good area for settlement and a large number of people moved there. In 1668, Triplicane was annexed to the Madras City, making it the first neighbourhood to be annexed to the city. It was obtained from the Sultan of Golconda on rent in 1676. From that time, Triplicane grew in importance, second only to George Town. In addition, the presence of the Nawab of Arcot increased the economic prosperity of the area, and many Muslims settled in Triplicane. In 1795, the Wallajah Mosque was built. During this period, Chepauk Palace and Amir Mahal were also built.

In 1841, the Ice House was built to store the ice bars imported from America through ships. Ice bars were imported to provide the English temporary relief from the blistering heat. This building was renamed Vivekananda house after Swami Vivekananda stayed in the building for a brief while.

In the mid-19th century, numerous educational institutions were formed in the area. Hindu Higher Secondary School was started in 1853 and Presidency College in 1864–65. In 1870, the college was moved to its present location on Beach Road. In 1884, Marina Beach promenade was built. In 1896, Sri Parthasarathy Swami Sabha (SPSS), the oldest sabha in Chennai, was founded and operated from the Hindu Higher Secondary School in Big Street

The building which used to serve as the Triplicane Police Station was built around 1891 to guard Madrasapatnam. This building was the city's oldest operating police station before it was moved to a newly built station across the road. Triplicane High Road is one of the roads that had a tram line running through it during the British reign.

In 1904, Triplicane Urban Co-Operative Society (TUCS) was started. The consumer cooperative society predates even the first Cooperative Credit Societies Act of 1904, which officially ushered in the cooperative movement into India. It runs a super market, self-service department stores, sells automobile fuel and cooking gas, and operates more than 200 rations shops for the Public Distribution System.

In 1916, Star Theatre was built on Triplicane High Road. The age old theatre was demolished in 2012.

In 1925, Mahatma Gandhi visited Triplicane to address a huge gathering. In 1933, he revisited the neighbourhood. In 1934, the first cricket match was played at the Chepauk Stadium.

In the early 20th century, Triplicane became one of the major residential areas of Madras.

=== Post-Independence ===
In 1963, Ice house was renamed as Vivekananda House. In 1993, Bharathiyar Illam was converted into a memorial.

In October 1997, the first train ran through the Thiruvallikeni MRTS Railway Station. The train was between Chennai Beach and Thirumayilai

Triplicane was one of the neighborhoods hit by the Indian Ocean tsunami on 26 December 2004.

== Location ==
Triplicane lies on the banks of the Buckingham Canal which bisects the neighbourhood along the north–south direction. The neighbourhood is bordered by Marina Beach on the east on the shore of the Bay of Bengal, Chepauk on the north, Royapettah on the west and northwest, Mylapore on the south and southwest.

== Geography ==
Natural hazards
Hazard	Percentage
Earthquake	60%
Flood	90%
Drought	100%
Landslide	0%
Volcano	0%
Cyclone	100%

The neighbourhood is classified as a tropical dry forest bio-zone. Being a coastal city, Chennai had many sand ridges. During the 16th century, the sea level rose and inundated lands within the settlements. When the sea withdrew, lagoons and ridges were left behind. One such ridge ran from the mouth of River Cooum to the present site of the Presidency College. On the rear side was a huge depression, where the college grounds have been built now. The ridge is the present Marina beach. Further south, a U-shaped ridge ran along Besant Road and Lloyds Road enclosing the Ice House. Parthasarathy Temple is just by the northern area of this ridge. Mount Road, now Anna Salai, ran along a tank bund and was at a high level. To the east of it, the land fell gradually, where Triplicane High Road and the Luz were formed.

Triplicane is susceptible to strong (vi) earthquakes, with occurrences at 5 to 6 Richter. On average, it receives one tremor every 50 years. However, the impact may be low. The neighbourhood is prone to periods of extreme droughts. The risk of flooding is high, and chances of cyclones are high, owing to its location near the coast.

== Neighbourhood ==
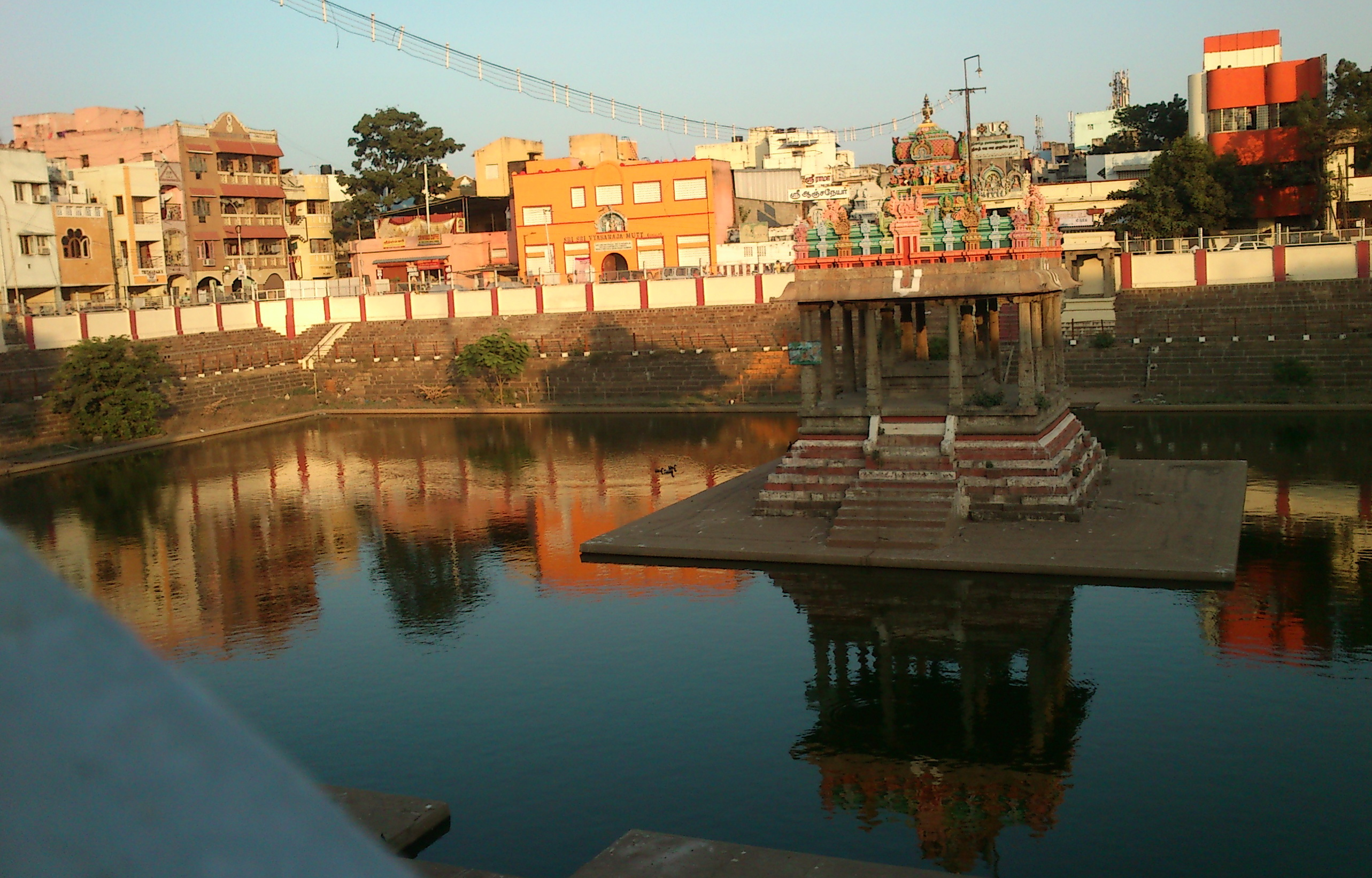
Residential developments near the Parthasarathy temple.

With an area of around 5 sq km, Triplicane is home to over 100,000 people, in addition to a floating population of 50,000 to 70,000. Average population density of the neighbourhood is 21,329 per square kilometre. Being an old neighbourhood of the city, it is congested with narrow lanes and streets.

== Housing ==
Known as 'Bachelor's Paradise', Triplicane is home to about 200 boarding houses out of the 700 odd ones in the city, many of them with about 30 to 60 rooms. Soon after independence, boarding houses began to appear in the area to cater to the needs of the individual migrants from various parts of the country. The first four boarding houses, were built in the 1950s by farmers from the southern parts of Tamil Nadu after successive droughts had threatened their livelihood. They gave out rooms on rent to traders who came to the city from other parts of the state. These are owned today by their progeny, without much change in their structures. Notable people who have at one time or another lived in the bachelor pads of Triplicane include political figures Periyar, C. N. Annadurai and M. Karunanidhi.

Availability of low-cost rentals and different affordable cuisines in the area is said to be the reason behind the constant patronage to these mansions for decades. Recently, these boarding houses have started attracting a more gentrified crowd.

== Roads ==
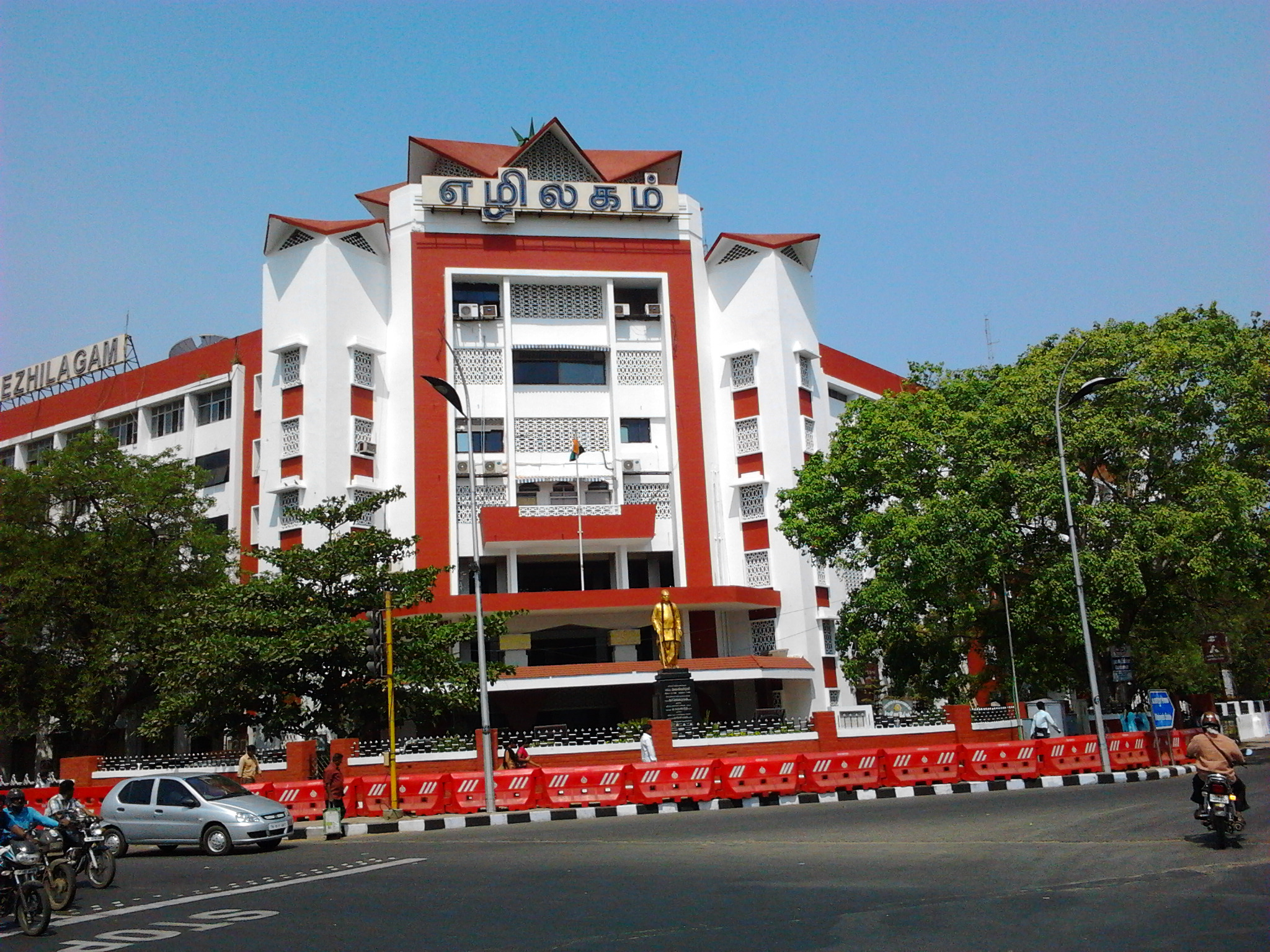
Ezhilagam

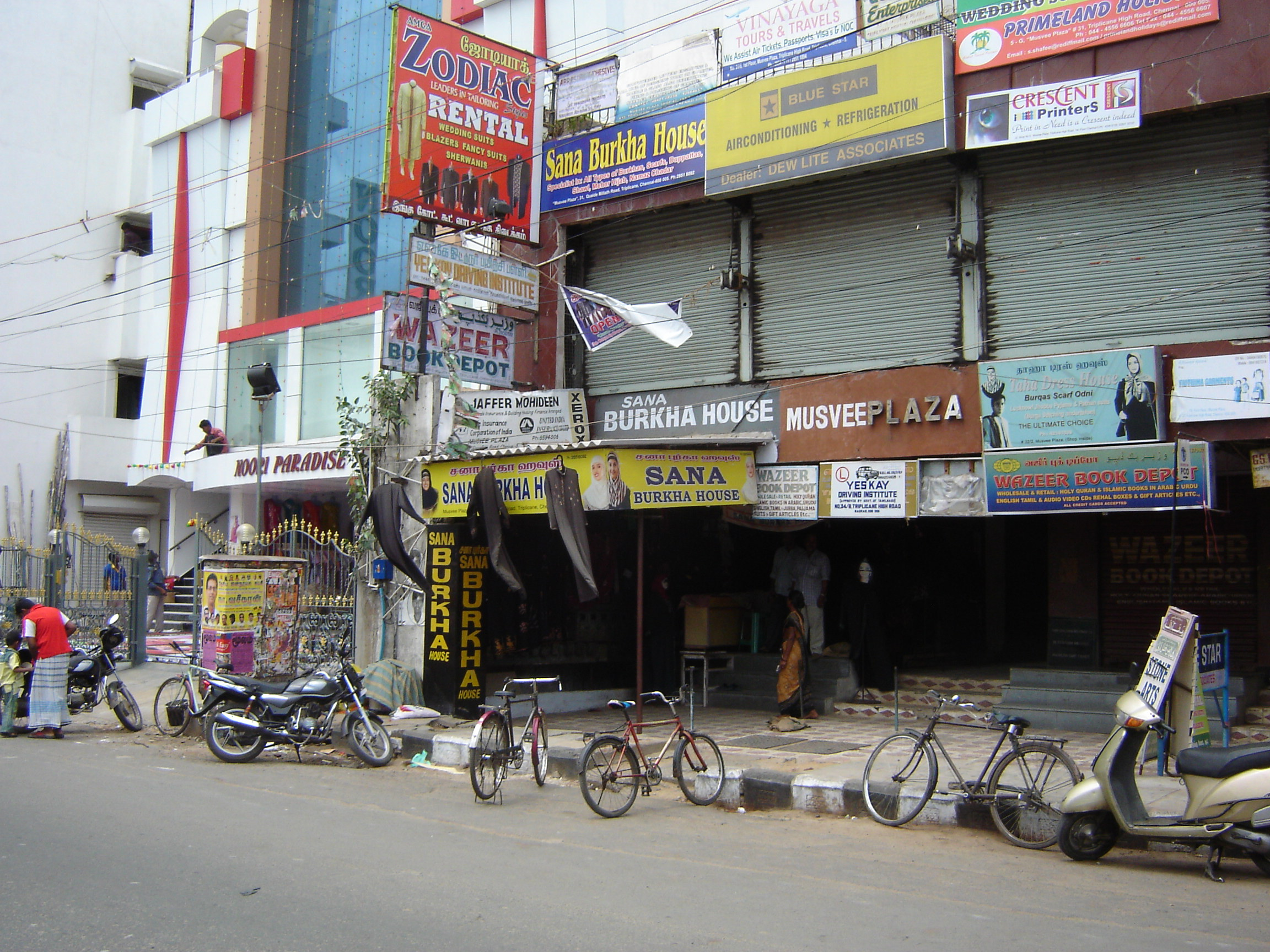
Triplicane High Road

The main roads of Triplicane include Beach Road (Kamarajar Salai), Pycrofts Road (Bharathi Salai), Triplicane High Road, and Besant Road. Pycrofts Road, also known as Bharathi Salai, is known for its numerous book shops, including pavement shops selling old and used books. Zam Bazaar is one of the oldest bazaars in the city and was set up in the pre-Independence era. The western end of the market is bordered by Amir Mahal, the palace of the Nawab of Arcot two centuries ago. The building is currently being renovated by the government.

The neighbourhood, however, suffers from drainage issues and other civic problems.

== Education ==
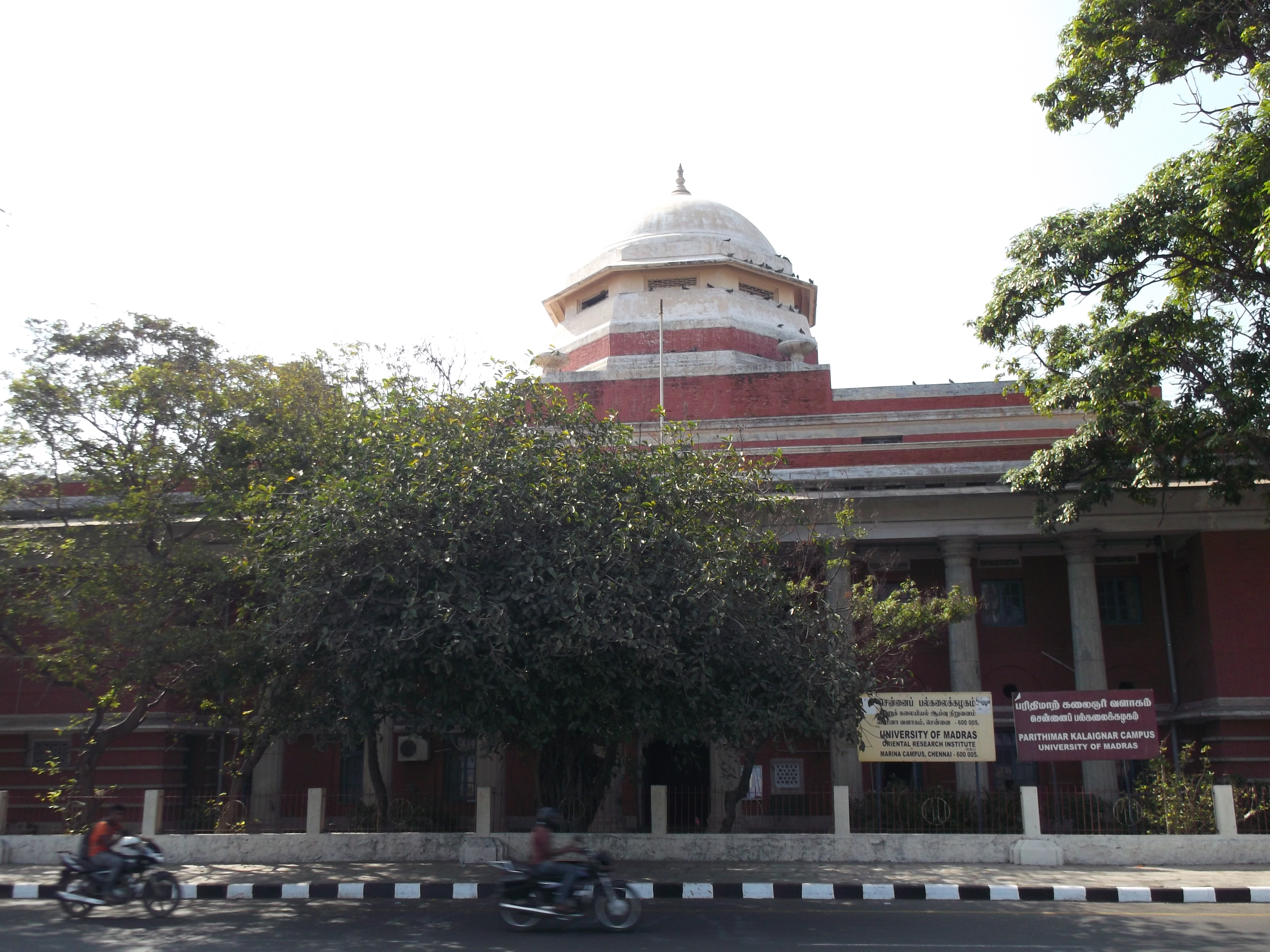
Triplicane campus of the University of Madras

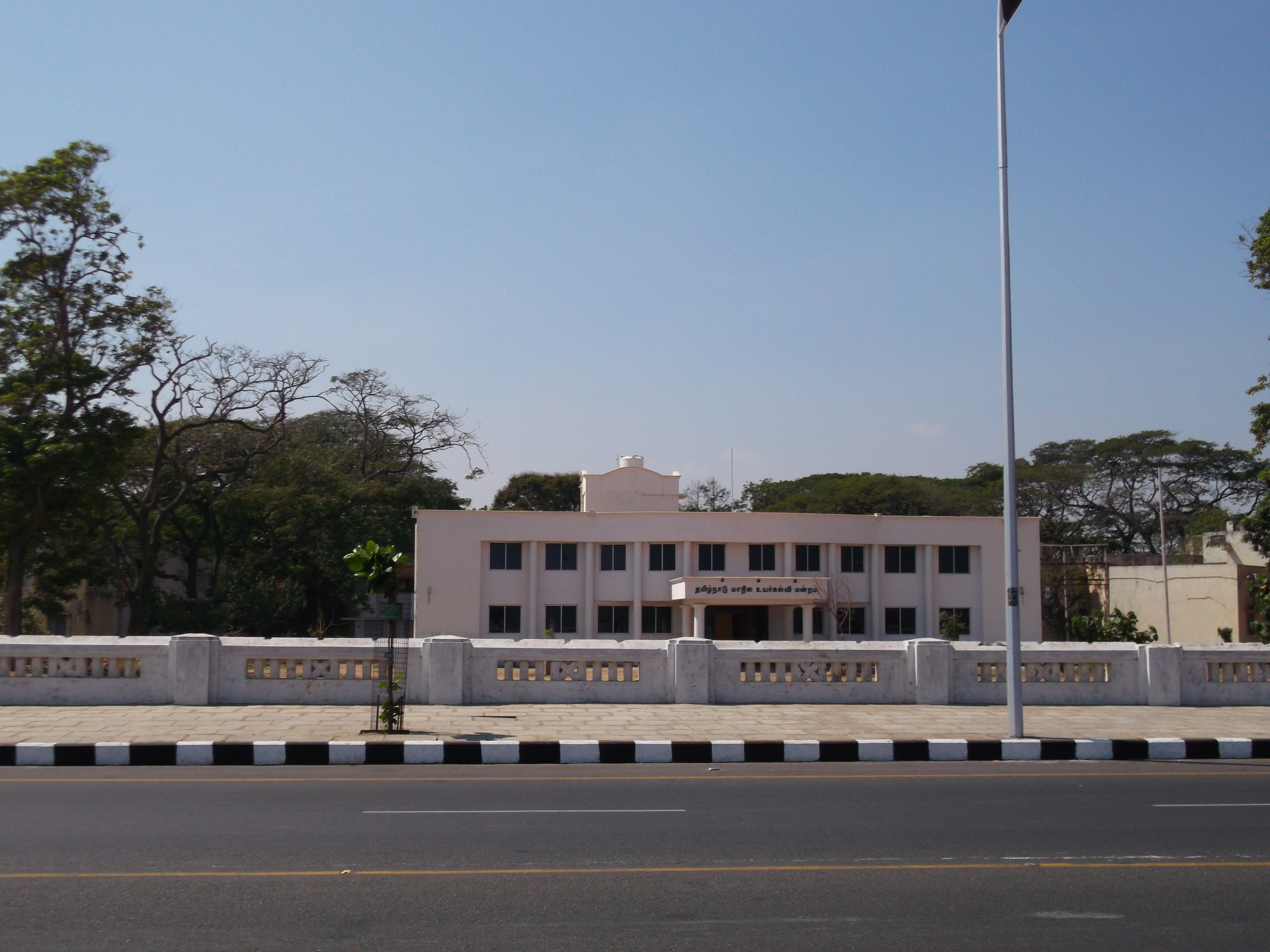
State Council for Higher Secondary Education at the Lady Wellingdon College campus

Colleges in the locality include Queen Mary's College, Presidency College and Madras University on the Beach Road. The popular schools in this area include Hindu Senior Secondary School, the Kellett higher secondary school, NKT, Rex, Hindu Higher Secondary School, Lady Wellington school, etc. Some of these schools, such as the latter two, date back to the British Era.

=== Library ===
Libraries in this area include Kasthuri Srinivasan Library on Besant Road, one on Peyalwar Koil street, Muhammadan Public Library and one on Big street. The Kasturi Srinivasan library is more than 50 years old.

== Culture ==
Triplicane has a rich culture. The culture associated with Parthasarathy temple and its mada veethis is old and traditional. Rooted in tradition, Triplicane is also known for its fine artistic taste in music, dance and arts. An annual community event known as the Thiruvallikeni Thiruvizha (literally 'Triplicane Festival') is celebrated in January. Other festivals include Triplicane Music Festival and Marghazhi (winter) festival. Triplicane is known for many of the traditional cuisines of Chennai.

=== Architecture ===
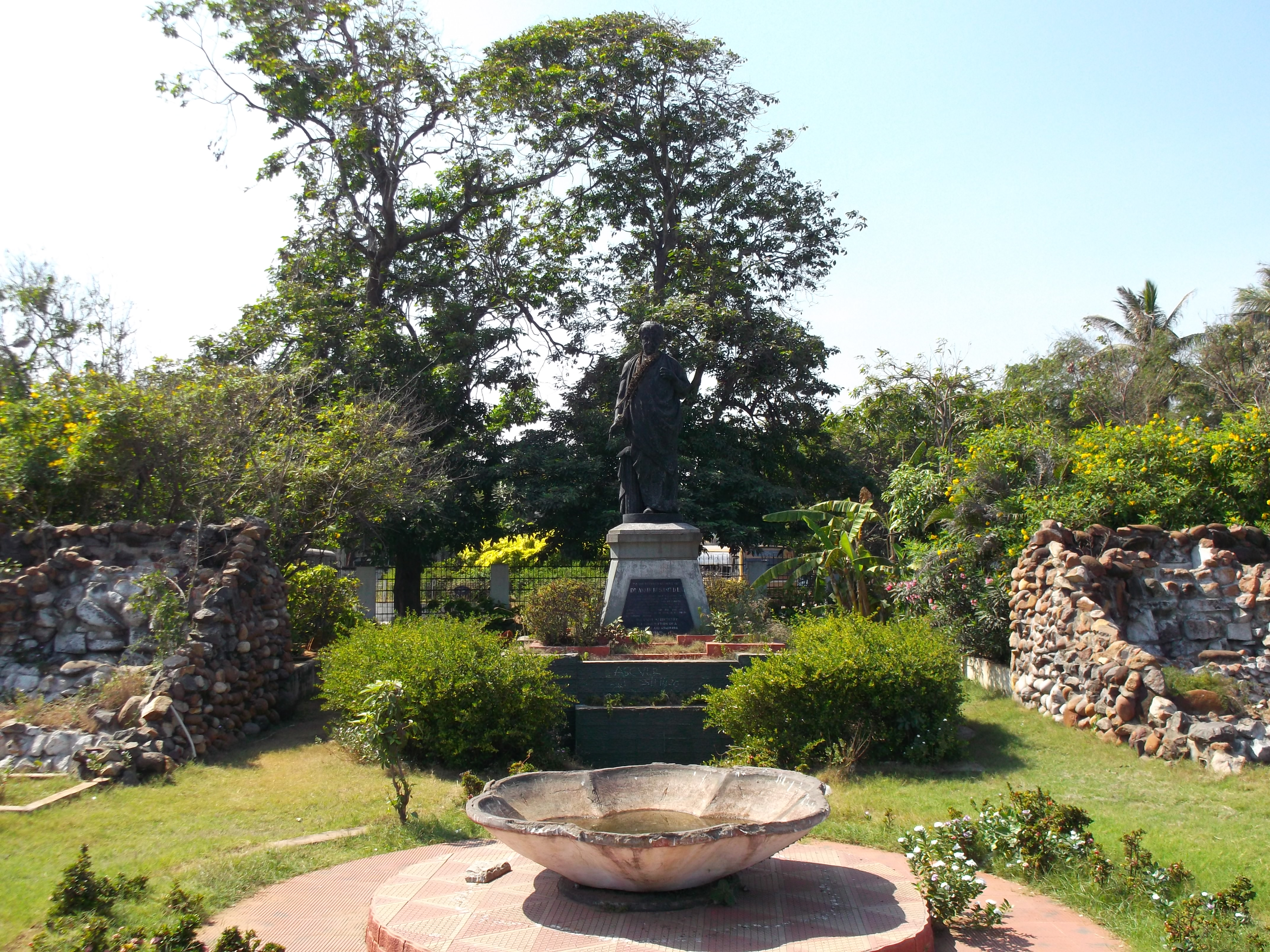
Annie Besant Park

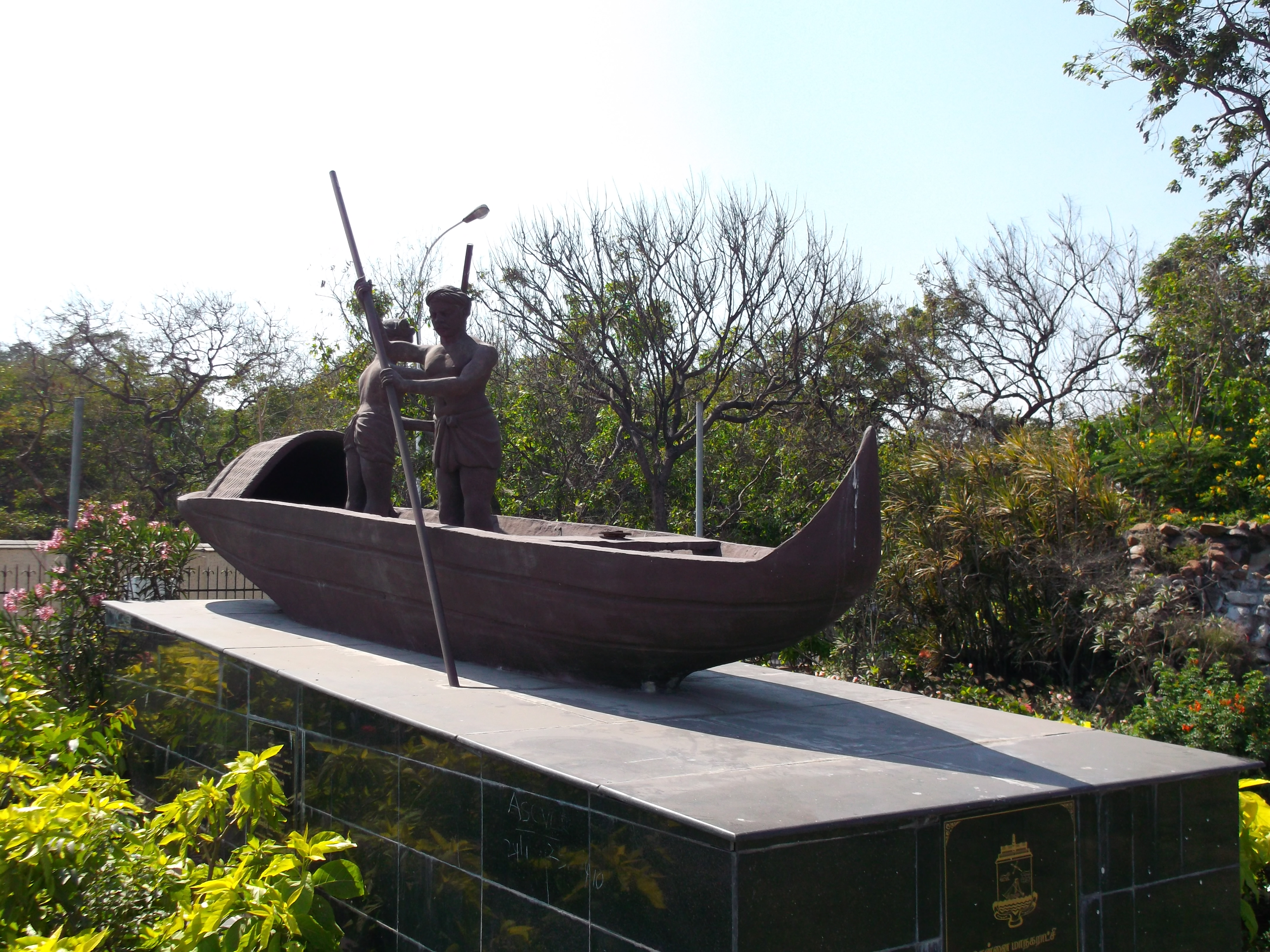
Fishermen statue at Annie Besant Park

Triplicane, similar to few other areas in the city such as Mylapore and West Mambalam, is known for its traditional row houses, known as agraharams. Typically, these can be seen where an entire street is occupied by Brahmins, particularly surrounding a temple. The architecture is distinctive with Madras terraces, country tile roofing, Burma teak rafters and lime plastering. The longish homes consisted of the mudhal kattu (receiving quarters), irandaam kattu (living quarters), moondram kattu (kitchen and backyard) and so on. Most houses had an open to sky space in the centre called the mitham, large platforms lining the outside of the house called the thinnai and a private well in the backyard. The floors were often coated with red oxide and sometimes the roofs had glass tiles to let in light. The agraharam quadrangle seen in Triplicane is around the Parthasarathy Temple and its tank.

About 50 families continue to live in the agraharams in Triplicane. However, many of these houses are being replaced with modern multi-storied apartments, resulting in a reduction in their numbers.

=== Religion ===
Although Parthasarathy Temple remains the most important temple of Triplicane, there exists several other temples in the neighbourhood, including Ellai Amman Temple, Ettampadai Murugan Temple, Peyalwar Temple built on the 13th century. and Thiruveteeswarar Temple. The thevaram has a reference of Thiruvateeswarar temple, which suggests its existence since the seventh century.

Mutts in the region include Uttradi Mutt on Singrachari Street, Ahobila Mutt Vanamamalai Mutt on East Tank Square Street,

The Wallajah Mosque, also known as the Big Mosque, is a historical mosque in the city. Built in 1795 in remembrance of Nawab Wallajah, the mosque was constructed with grey granite, without the use of wood or steel.

==== Vaikunta Ekadesi ====
Vaikunta Ekadesi Festival is held in this temple and huge crowds gather on the day of the festival. Vaikunta Ekadesi Vrata is observed on Dhanur Masa Shukla Paksha Ekadasi, or on the 11th day of bright fortnight during Dhanur Masam. This festival is celebrated with much devotion in many Vaishnavaite temples, including Parthasarathy temple in South India. Vaikunta Dwara lies in the north side of the temple. Vaikunta Ekadesi is also observed as Mukkoti Ekadesi.

The streets of Triplicane are full of people as early as 2:00 a.m. on Vaikunta Ekadesi. Women adorned in the traditional nine yards or a silk sari hurry towards the Parthasarathy Temple to find a place in the long winding queues.

The busy crowds move slowly towards the shrine, crossing the Paramapadavaasal along with the presiding deity. More than one hundred thousand devotees visit the temple who are helped by volunteers, temple authorities and police personnel to move around the prakarams. Police are stationed around the temple and atop watchtowers at the junction of the Mada Streets to maintain strict vigil.

=== Carnatic music ===
Triplicane was also once the seat of Carnatic music. Triplicane was not only known for weekend visits by several musicians, but also for resident legends such as G. N. Balasubramaniam (GNB) and M. S. Subbulakshmi (M.S.). The right atmosphere for music and dance permeated Triplicane. A proliferation of sabhas – Triplicane Arts Academy, Thiruvateeswarar Sabha, N.K.T. Muthu Sabha and Parthasarathy Swami Sabha – drew these heavyweights in the classical arts to the locality. Musicians used to talk of how they had sung at the Hindu High School or heard GNB at some other Triplicane venue. It was said that Triplicane was where vidwans would spend afternoons discussing music over hot rava pongal at the Krishna Iyer Hotel. The 1965s and 1970s saw music and dance pervade the area in various sabhas. The neighbourhood has hosted leading artists from M.S. and GNB to Manakkal Rangarajan, from the stage plays of M.G. Ramachandran and Sivaji Ganesan to actor Sivakumar's debut play. Thus Triplicane was the central locality where all the cultural happenings of the city took place.

== Politics ==
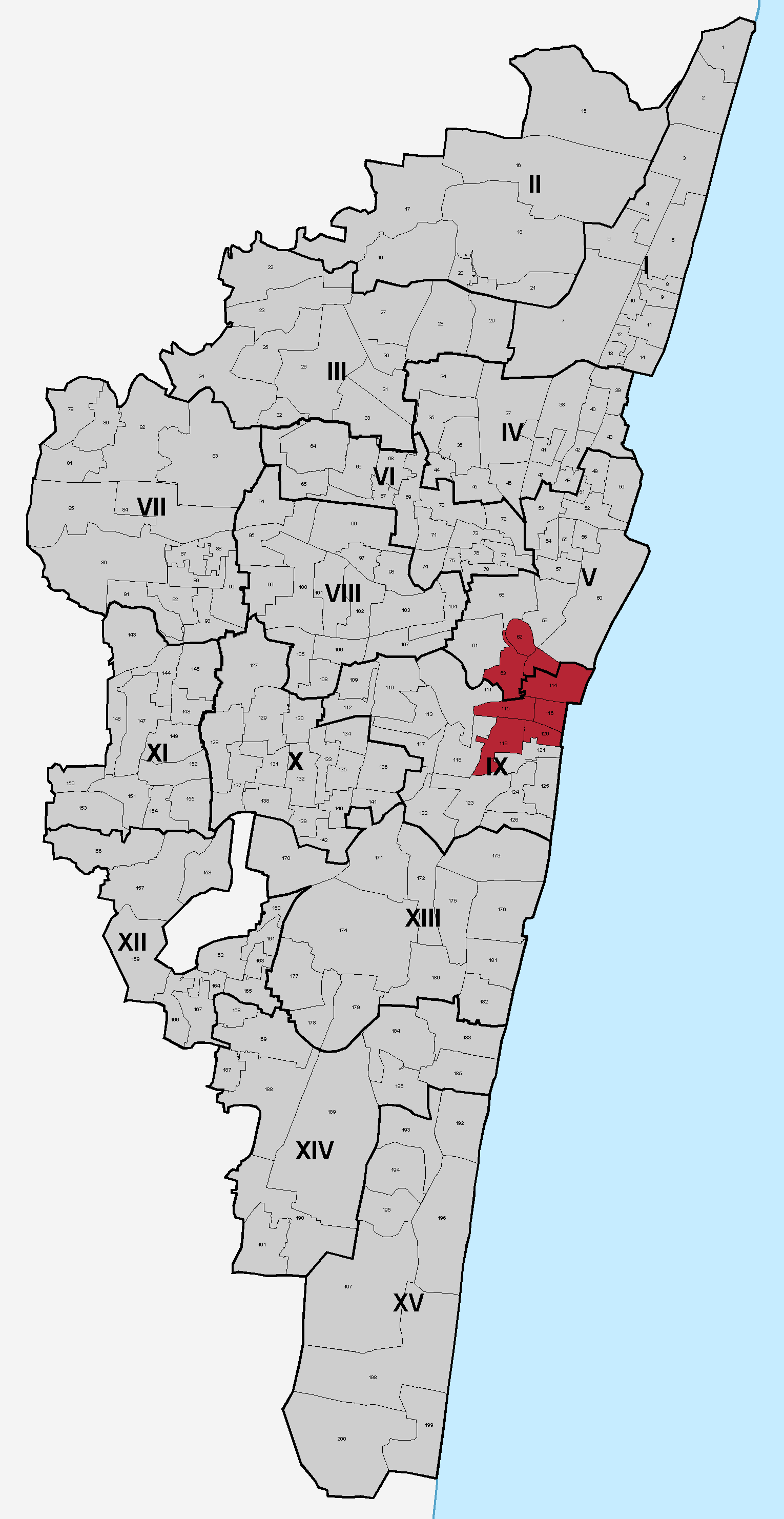
Chennai assembly Chepauk-Triplicane constituency

Triplicane is a part of Chepauk-Triplicane assembly constituency which in turn a part of Central Chennai Constituency. The MLA Hostel is located on Wallajah Road. Rajaji Hall in the same campus, which was built between 1800 and 1802, used to have a role in state administration. At present, it houses the offices of the Tamil Nadu State Raffle.

== Public transport ==
Being situated in the central region of the city, Triplicane is well connected to various places in Chennai. The MTC operates bus termini such as Ice House and Triplicane (located at Pycrofts Road). The Triplicane bus terminus, one of the oldest bus termini in the city, is not functional now. The MTC has moved all services which were originating from Triplicane to the near-by Anna square terminus and some services are extended to Broadway. The MRTS has two stations Thiruvallikeni and Light House railway station on the Chennai Beach–Velachery elevated rail corridor serving the neighbourhood. In addition, the neighbourhood is served by private auto rickshaws.

Government Estate Metro Station serves the area. The Station operates on the Blue Line.

== Notable people ==
Triplicane has been home to a number of personalities over the years. Mathematician Srinivasa Ramanujan, Writer Sujatha, and cricketers M.J. Gopalan, Krish Srikkanth and W.V. Raman all hailed from Triplicane. Nobel Prize winner Subrahmanyan Chandrasekhar did his schooling in the Hindu High School (1922–1925) in Triplicane. Subramania Bharati, a freedom fighter and poet, lived his last years in the house opposite the Parthasarathy temple's western entrance; the house has since been bought and renovated by the Government of Tamil Nadu in 1993, and it was named Bharathiyar Illam (Home of Bharathiyar).
