= Venkatakrishnan =

Venkatakrishnan is a surname. Notable people with the surname include:

- C. S. Venkatakrishnan (born 1966), American banker, CEO of Barclays
- Srinivasan Venkatakrishnan (born 1966), British business executive
