= Ramakrishnan =

Ramakrishnan is a Tamil forename or surname.

People named Ramakrishnan:

- Venki Ramakrishnan, British-American structural biologist, awarded the 2009 Nobel Prize for Chemistry.
- S. Ramakrishnan (activist), disability rehabilitation activist from southern Tamil Nadu, founder of Amar Seva Sangam
- S. Ramakrishnan, Tamil author and Tamil film dialogue writer
- Raghu Ramakrishnan, Indian-American computer scientist, vice-president of Yahoo!
- T. K. Ramakrishnan, Indian politician from Kerala
- T. V. Ramakrishnan (* 1941), Indian theoretical physicist
- Therambil Ramakrishnan, Indian politician from Kerala
- Shanker Ramakrishnan, Indian film director from Kerala
- C. K. Ra or C. K. Ramakrishnan Nair, Indian painter from Kerala
- Chirayinkeezhu Ramakrishnan Nair, Malayalam lyricist from Kerala
- Malayattoor Ramakrishnan, Indian novelist from Kerala
- Kadammanitta Ramakrishnan, Indian poet from Kerala
- Alladi Ramakrishnan, Indian physicist and founder of Matscience
- Ramakrishnan (actor), Indian film actor
- Maitreyi Ramakrishnan, Canadian actress
