= Tamil Nadu Police =

Indian law enforcement agency

Tamil Nadu Police Tamiḻ Nāḍu Kāval Tuṟai
- Logo of Tamil Nadu Police
- Motto: Truth Alone Triumphs

Agency overview
- Formed: September 6, 1859; 167 years ago
- Employees: 111,897 (2020)
- Annual budget: ₹133.52 billion (US$1.4 billion) (2025-26)

Jurisdictional structure
- Operations jurisdiction: Tamil Nadu, India
- Map of Tamil Nadu Police Department's jurisdiction
- Area: 130,058 km^{2} (50,216 sq mi)
- Population: 72,147,030 (2011)
- Legal jurisdiction: Tamil Nadu
- General nature: Civilian police

Operational structure
- Overseen by: Department of Home, Prohibition and Excise, Government of Tamil Nadu
- Headquarters: Kamarajar Salai, Mylapore, Chennai
- Minister responsible: C. Joseph Vijay, Chief Minister and Minister for Home and Police
- Agency executive: Mahesh Kumar Aggarwal DGP, Head of Police
- Child agency: List; Greater Chennai Police; Coimbatore City Police; Tiruchirappalli City Police; Avadi Police; Tambaram City Police
- Police districts: 39 (including 2 railway districts)

Website
- www.tnpolice.gov.in

Tamil Nadu Police is the primary law enforcement agency of the state of Tamil Nadu, India. It is headquartered in Chennai. It functions under the Home Department of the Government of Tamil Nadu. It is headed by Director General of Police, who is assisted by other police officers.

The Tamil Nadu Police consists of three functional units–Law & Order, crime, and traffic. There are several other special units, which carry out dedicated function. For administrative purposes, it is organised into four zones, which are further sub-divided into 11 ranges, and encompasses 39 districts (excluding Chennai and includes two railway police districts). The major cities have Police Commissionerates, which there are nine including the Greater Chennai Police.

The precursor to the modern Tamil Nadu Police began during the British Raj, when the Madras Police was established in 1859. After Indian Independence in 1947, it came under the Madras Province, and was renamed Tamil Nadu Police in 1969.

As of 2022, there are 1,302 Law and Order Police Stations, 202 All Women Police Stations, 243 Traffic Police Stations, 47 Railway Police Stations, 27 Police Out Posts, and 30 Traffic Investigation Wings. In 2021, there were 118,881 personnel in the Tamil Nadu Police against a sanctioned strength of 133,198 personnel.

== History ==
In 1770, Josias Du Pré, the Governor of Madras constituted a police board for maintenance of public law and order in Madras, and the post of Superintendent of Police was created in 1780. In 1859, the Madras Police, was officially established as per the Madras District Police Act (Act No. XXIV). In 1865, the police headquarters was established in its present location in Madras. In 1905, a police training school was established, and a dedicated criminal investigation department (CID) was formed the next year. In 1919, the organisation was revamped, and the position of Inspector General of Police was established to head the police department, while the Madras City Police was led by a Commissioner of Police. In 1923, the armed force division was established, and the special branch of the CID was formed in 1928. In 1929, the department was reorganised into three functional divisions of crime, law and order and traffic in the city of Madras.

After Indian Independence in August 1947, the Madras Police came under the administrative control of the Madras Province. In 1951, a canine unit was established as a part of the department. In 1957, the headquarters of the Madras Special Police was moved to Tiruchirappalli. A forensic sciences laboratory was established in 1961. In 1963, a police hospital was established in Madras, and a home guards unit was formed to assist the police. The organisation was renamed as Tamil Nadu Police, after renaming of the state in 1969. Women were inducted into the police force for the first time in 1973. In 1976, the Tamil Nadu Police became the first police force in the country to introduce computers. Later that year, a special cell (Q branch) of the CID was established to probe important cases. In 1991, the Uniformed Service Recruitment Board was constituted for the recruitment of non-gazzetted police officers. In 1992, the first all women police station was established in the state. In 1994, a special human rights wing was formed as a part of the Tamil Nadu Police.

Dedicated highway patrol were introduced in 2003. In 2004, a women police battalion was formed, the first such unit in India. Later in the year, an integrated control room was established at Chennai. In 2005, the organisation was revamped, with changes to jurisdiction, and a centralised State Crime Records Bureau was established. The Tamil Nadu Police Academy was opened in 2009 at Chennai. In 2010, a dedicated Organised Crime Intelligence Unit was established. The boundaries were reorganised further in 2011, and the Greater Chennai Police was established as the dedicated law and order agency in the Chennai metropolitan region. In 2015, a special crime squad was established in 20 districts to investigate notorious crimes. In 2022, the department set up a dedicated Cyber Crime Investigation Centre at Chennai.

== Headquarters ==
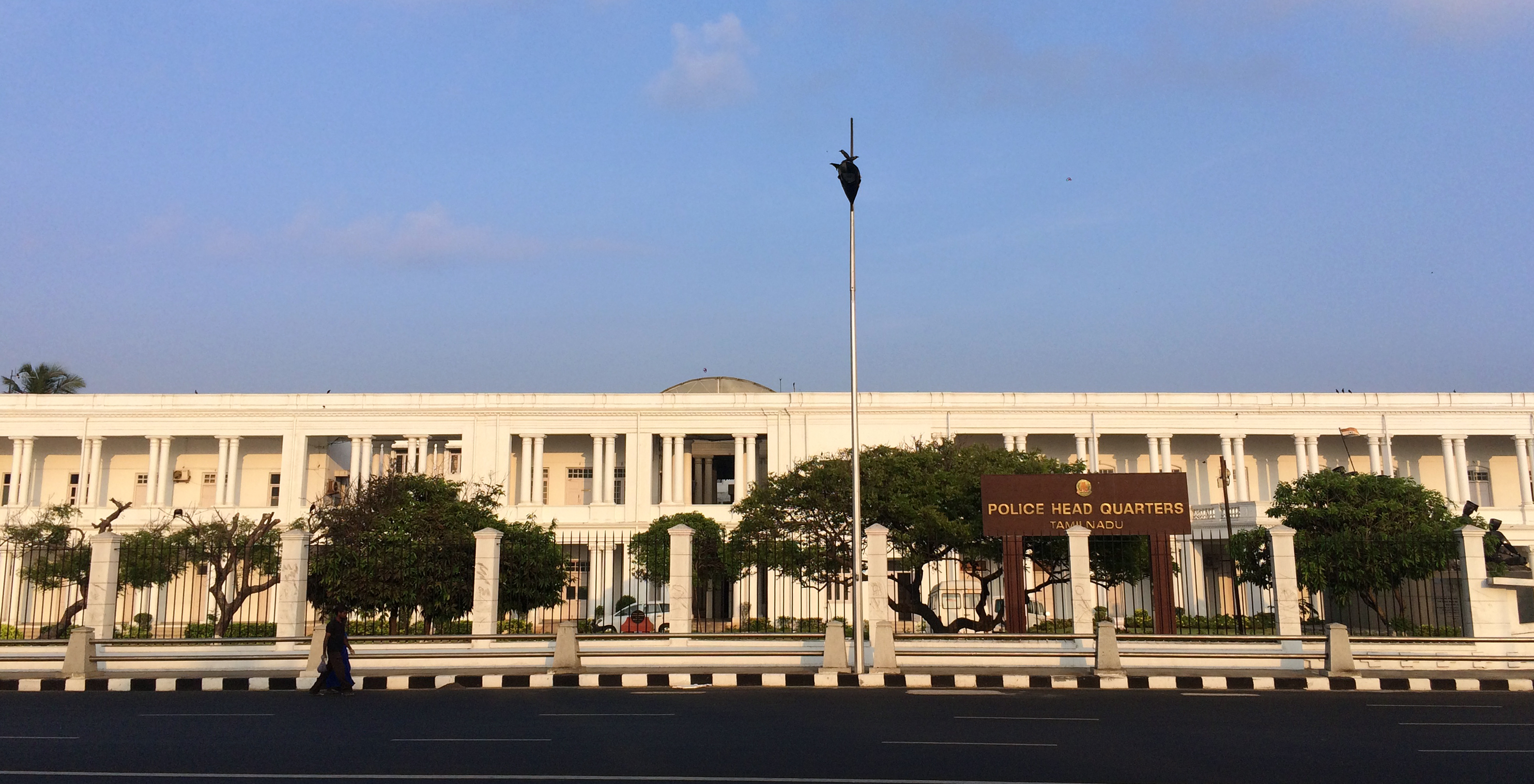
Police headquarters building, Chennai

The Tamil Nadu Police is headquartered at the Police headquarters building in Chennai. It is located on Kamarajar Salai along the promenade of the Marina Beach, and spread over an area of 11.7 acres (4.7 ha).

It was built in 1839 originally as a Free Masons lodge, and was taken on lease by the Police in 1865. In 1874, the building was bought by the government and expanded. The building is classified as a heritage structure. A new annexure building, consisting of three blocks, spread over a built-up area of 161,000 ft^{2} (15,000 m^{2}), was added in 2012 at a cost of ₹245 million (equivalent to ₹500 million or US$5.4 million in 2026).

== Organization ==
The Tamil Nadu Police functions under the purview of the Home Department of the Government of Tamil Nadu. It is headed by a Director General of Police (DGP), who is designated as the Head of Police Force (HoPF). The DGP may be assisted by special and additional DGPs. The various functional wings of the police department are headed by an Additional Director General of Police. For administrative purposes, the state has been divided into four police zones–North, South, West and Central, each headed by an Inspector General of Police (IG). The zones are further divided into 11 ranges, headed by Deputy Inspector General of Police (DIG), who oversee a jurisdiction of one or more districts and report to the IGs of the respective zones. There are 39 districts (excluding Chennai district and including two Railway Police districts), each headed by a Superintendent of Police (SP). District Superintendents of Police are assisted by Additional Superintendents of Police (ADSP). These districts are further organised into 249 sub-divisions, each headed by an Assistant Assistant Superintendent of Police (ASP) or Deputy Superintendent of Police (DSP), and consists of several police stations under its jurisdiction.

The major metropolitan cities are headed by a Commissioner of Police (CP). There are nine commissionerates, with the Greater Chennai Police headed by a commissioner with a rank equivalent to ADGP, while the other police commisionerates are headed by a Commissioner equivalent to the rank of IG. The Commissioners are assisted by Additional and Joint Commissioners, while Deputy Commissioners (equivalent to SP rank), and Assistant Commissioners (equivalent DSP rank) form the second level administrative structure.

Zonal organisation
Zone	Number of districts	Districts (Note: Excluding the city commissionerates of major metropolitan cities.)
North Zone	10	Kanchipuram, Thiruvallur, Cuddalore, Villuppuram, Vellore, Ranipet, Thirupattur, Tiruvannamalai, Kallakurichi, Chengalpattu
West Zone	8	Coimbatore, Tiruppur, Salem, The Nilgiris, Erode, Dharmapuri, Krishnagiri, Namakkal
Central Zone	9	Thanjavur, Tiruchirappalli, Perambalur, Ariyalur, Karur, Nagapattinam, Tiruvarur, Pudukottai, Mayiladuthurai
South Zone	10	Madurai, Dindigul, Ramanathapuram, Sivagangai, Theni, Virudhunagar, Tuticorin, Tirunelveli Rural, Kanyakumari, Tenkasi
Zone	Number of cities	Cities
Commissionerates	9	Greater Chennai, Coimbatore, Tiruchirappalli, Madurai, Salem, Tiruppur, Tirunelveli, Avadi, Tambaram

Each police station is typically headed by an Inspector, or in semi-urban and rural areas, by a Sub-Inspector (SI). The head of police station is known as Station House Officer (SHO), who is the officer incharge. A police station generally comprises Sub-Inspectors, special Sub-Inspectors, Head Constables, and Constables, who are responsible for routine policing and investigation. As of 2022, there are 1,302 Law and Order Police Stations, 202 All Women Police Stations, 243 Traffic Police Stations, 47 Railway Police Stations, 27 Police Out Posts, and 30 Traffic Investigation Wings.

=== Special units ===
Various special units operate under the Tamil Nadu Police department. These units perform specific functions related to security, intelligence, criminal investigations and support services.

- Crime Branch Criminal Investigation Department (CB-CID): It was established in 1906, and functions under the purview of the DIG. It is organised into Organized Crime Unit, Counterfeit Currency Wing, Special Investigation Division, Cyber Crime Wing, Anti-Trafficking Cell, and Police Research Centre. The Cyber Crime Wing is led by an ADGP, and manages dedicated cyber crime police stations in the state. The Cyber Crime Investigation Centre in Chennai, deals with organised cyber crime, ransomware attacks, cryptocurrency frauds, and suspect social media activities. The Social Media Monitoring Centre was established in 2022 to curb the spread of fake news and misinformation online.
- Intelligence: The Intelligence Wing is responsible for the gathering and dissemination of information relating to law and order. It consists of a Special Branch CID (Q Branch), Security Branch, Organized Crime Intelligence Unit, each of which is headed by a SP. The Q Branch is responsible for intelligence gathering on important and covert activities, which might cause disturbance to law and order. The Security Branch is responsible for the security arrangements for visits of VIPs, and providing protection to top government office holders.
- Crime Wing: The Crime wing consists of Narcotics Intelligence Bureau, which deals with the prevention and control of banned narcotic substances, and the Intellectual Property Right Enforcement Cell, which is responsible for handling cases with respect to intellectual property rights and preventing video piracy.
- Economic Offenses Wing (EOW): The Economic Offenses Wing investigates cases of fraud with companies and financial institutions. It also consists of the Commercial Crime Investigation Wing, established in 1971, which investigates offenses relating to the misappropriation of government funds, and the Idol Wing, established in 1983, which deals with the prevention and recovery of antiques and idols.
- State Crime Records Bureau (SCRB): The divisions include the Police Computer Wing, Finger Print Bureau, Modus Operandi Bureau, and Statistical Cell. It is also responsible for the implementation and maintenance of the Crime & Criminal Tracking Network and Systems, an integrated system, which maintains the criminal records. It is also responsible for the implementation of e-services such as online complaint registration, tracking status of cases, downloading First Information Report, and recovery of last documents. It also maintains databases of missing persons, and vehicles. The Modus Operandi Bureau is responsible for dissemination of information collected by the Intelligence Bureau within the police department. The Finger Print Bureau, established in 1895, is responsible for maintaining the finger print records of criminals, and comparison of the same for cases.
- Tamil Nadu Special Police Battalion (TSP): The battalion consists of 15 special armed force units spread across the state. It also operates a training centre, and an arms workshop.
- Operations Wing: The Operations wing is composed of the Commando Force and Training School, and Bomb Disposal Squads. The Commando Force is used for special operations such as anti-terrorist operations, and in disaster management.
- Special Task Force: The Special Task Force is headed by an IG, and are trained for counter insurgency and militancy operations, and aiding in rescue operations.
- Coastal Security Group (CSG): The Coastal Security Group is responsible for the security of the 1,076 km (669 mi)-long coastline of the state. It operates various marine police stations, and outposts, and is responsible for maritime security, and security of ports and settlements along the coast. It operates patrols and provides support to the Indian Coast Guard.
- Railway Police: The Railway Police is divided into two districts, which are further sub-divided into seven sub-divisions and manages 47 Railway Police Stations and 10 Railway out posts. It is responsible for providing security to the railway stations, trains, and other rail infrastructure.

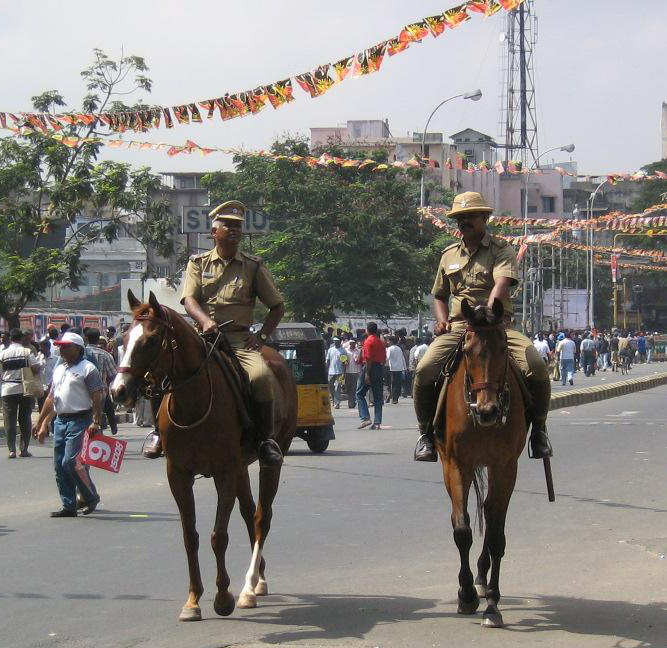
Horse mounted police unit

- Social Justice and Human Rights Unit: The Wing was created in 1972, and is headed by an ADGP. It is responsible for investigation and prevention of human rights abuses, and caste related atrocities.
- Auxilary Units: The Auxilary Units include Dog Squads, and horse mounted police units.
- Training School: The Police Training School was established in 1896, which later became the Tamil Nadu Police Academy. It is responsible for the training of all police personnel in the department.
- Technical Services: The Technical Services Wing consists of technical and operational wings. It manages the Emergency Response System and Central Control Room, data centers, and passport verification.
- Prohibition Enforcement Wing: The Wing is responsible for the prevention of manufacture and distribution of illicit and spurious liquor.
- Home Guards: The Home Guards unit was created as an auxiliary force, and aids the regular police and special units in traffic control, rescue and disaster management, and awareness programmes.

== Personnel ==
As of 2021, there are 118,881 personnel in the Tamil Nadu Police against a sanctioned strength of 133,198 personnel.

=== Ranks ===
Gazetted Officers

Indian Police Service cadre officers rank insignia
Insignia
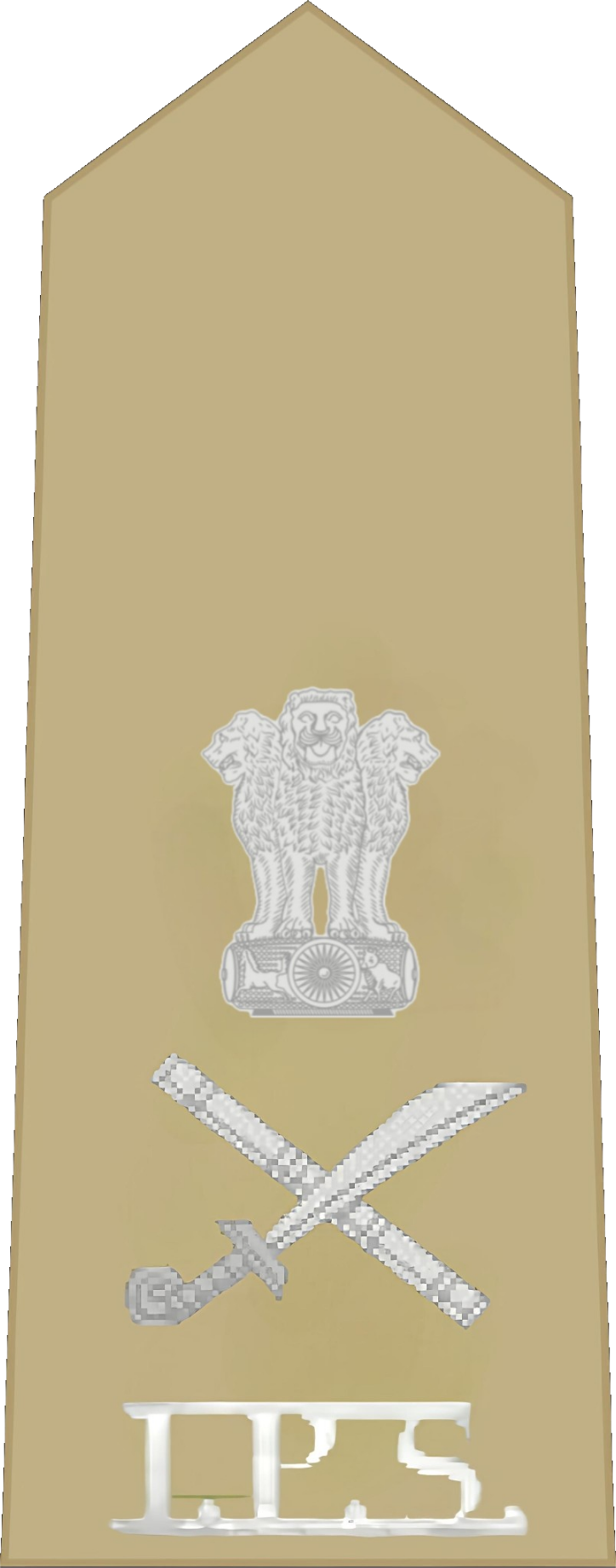
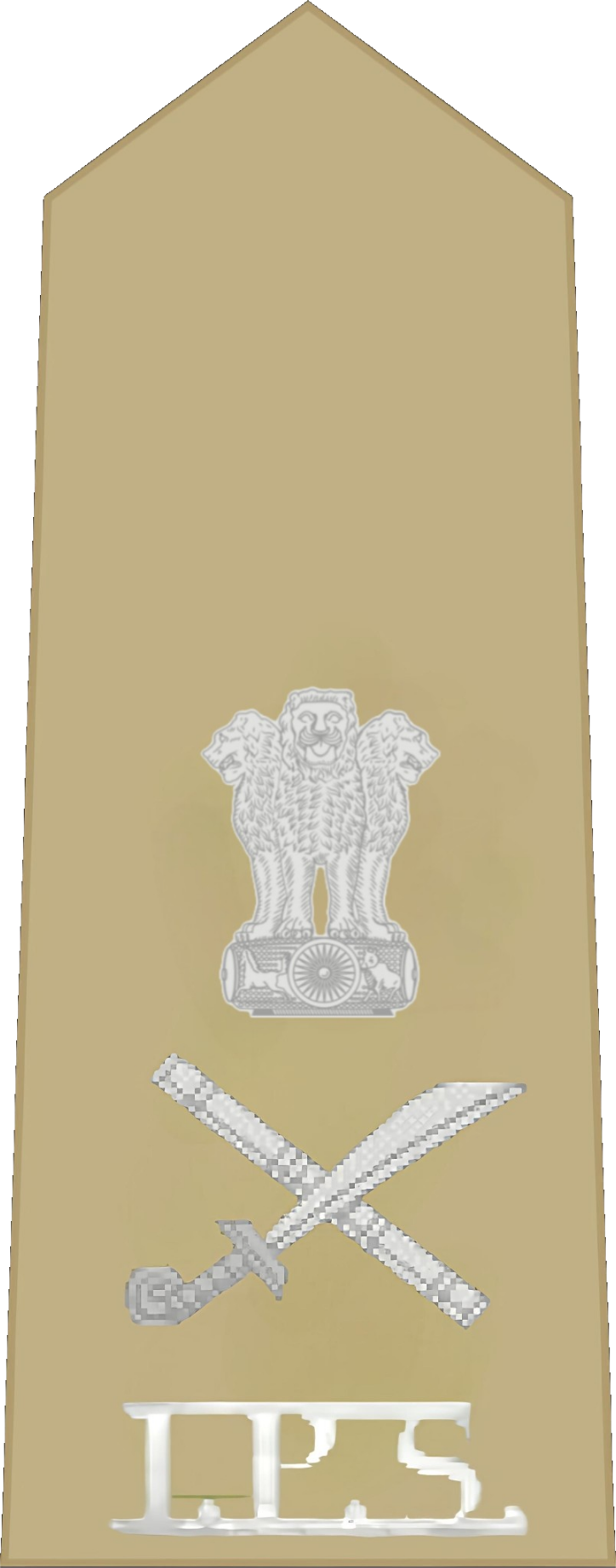
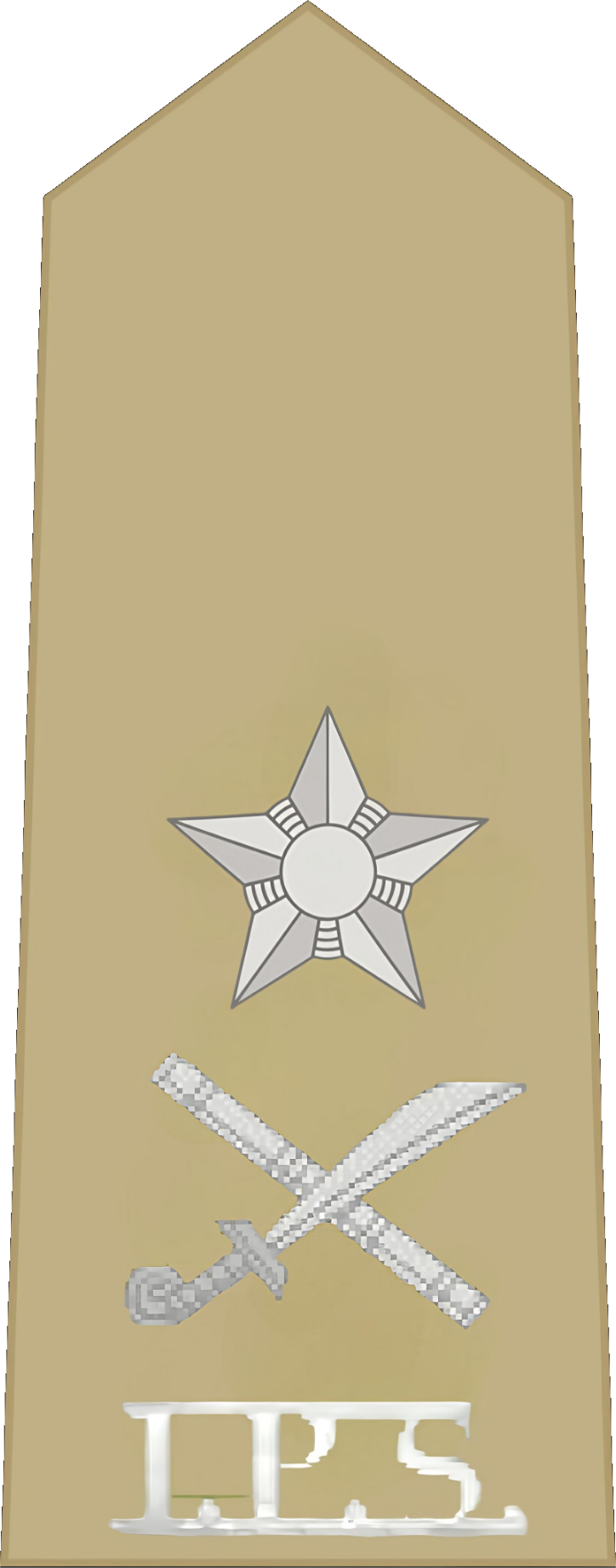
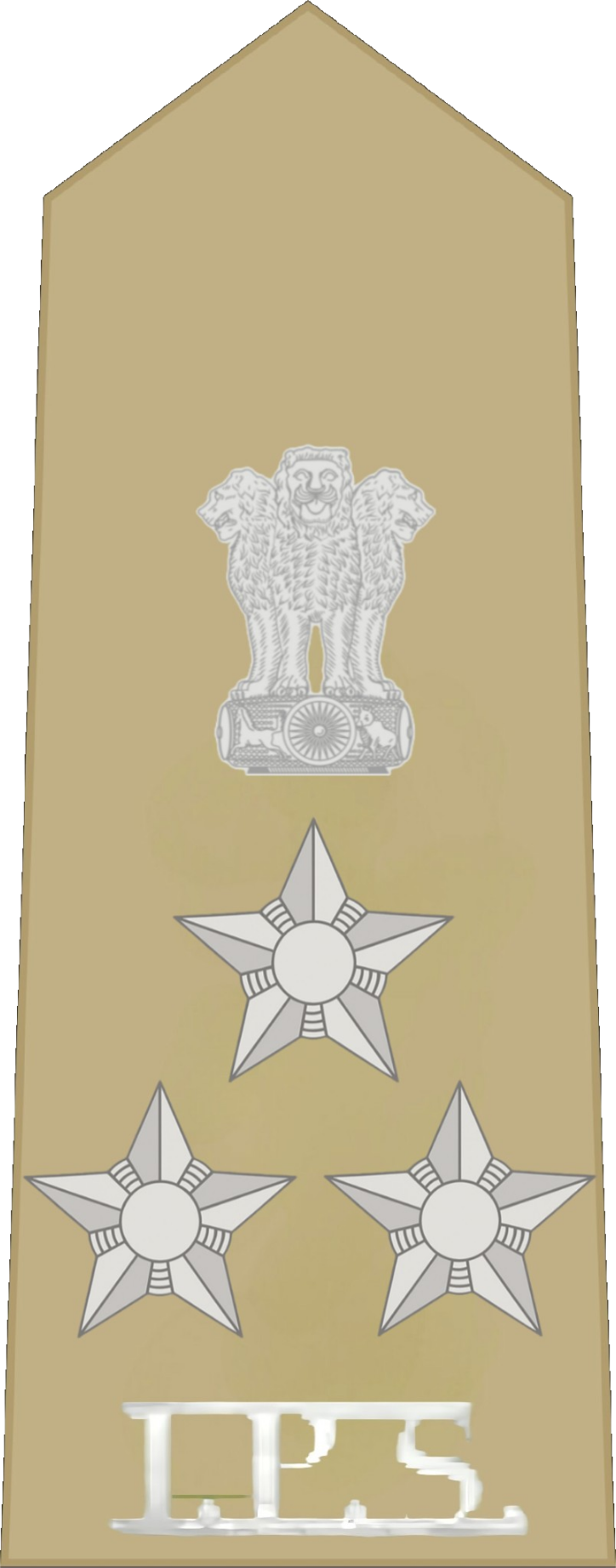
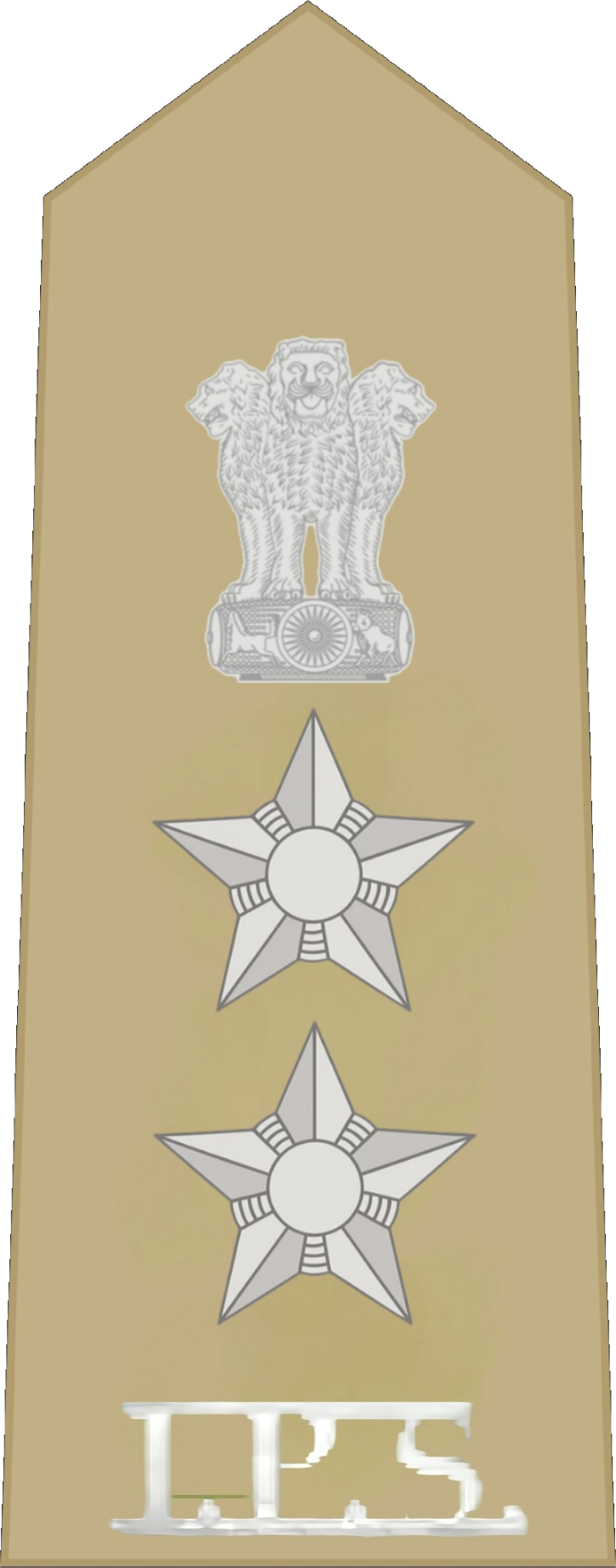
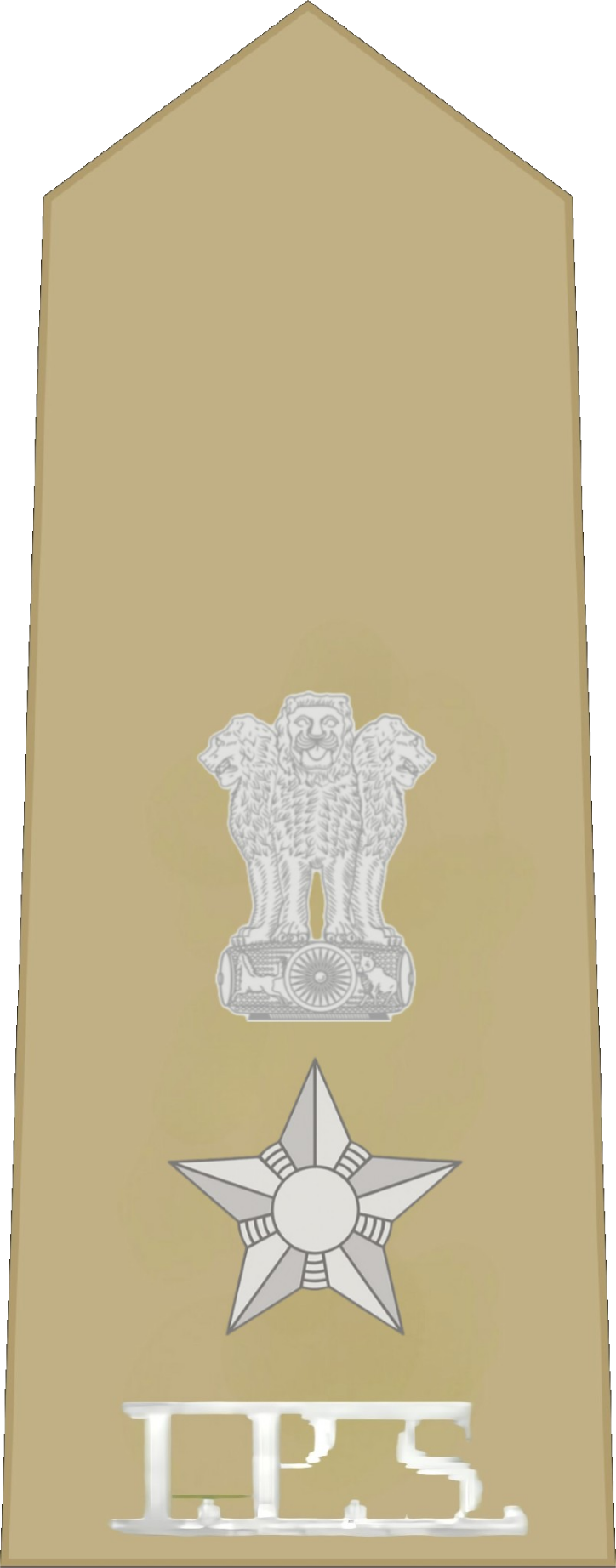
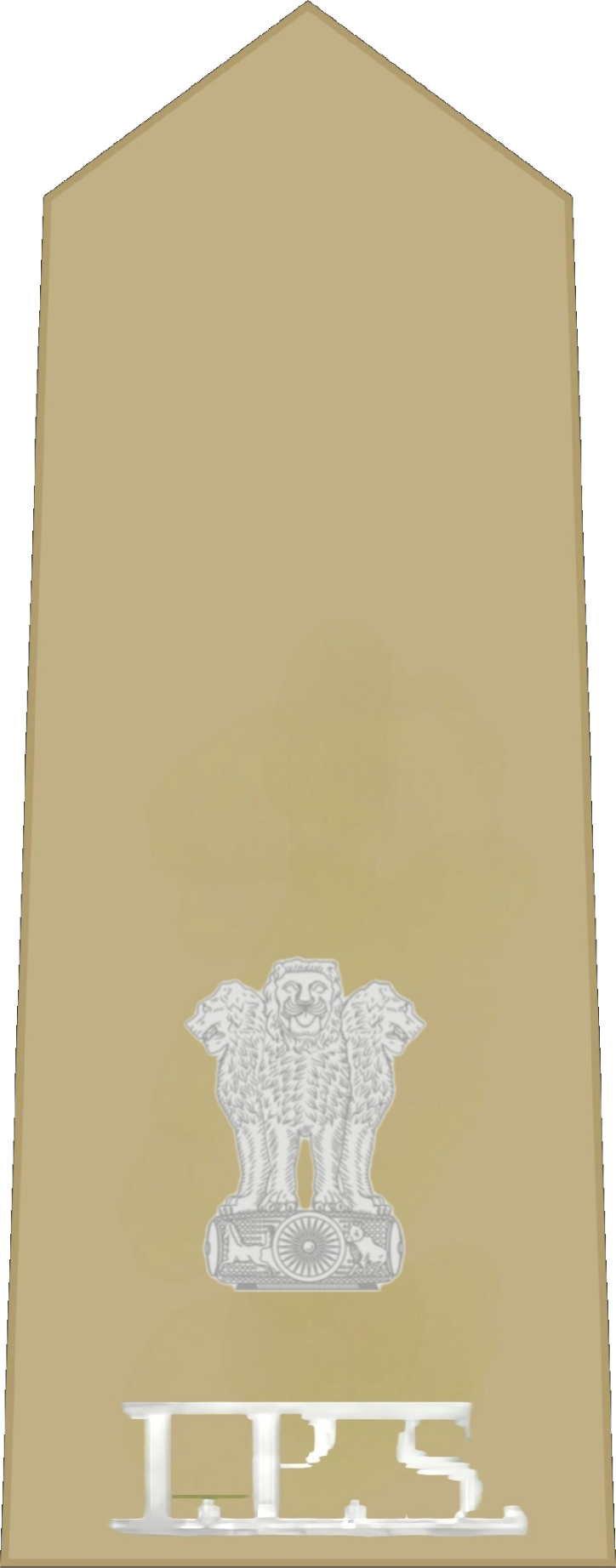
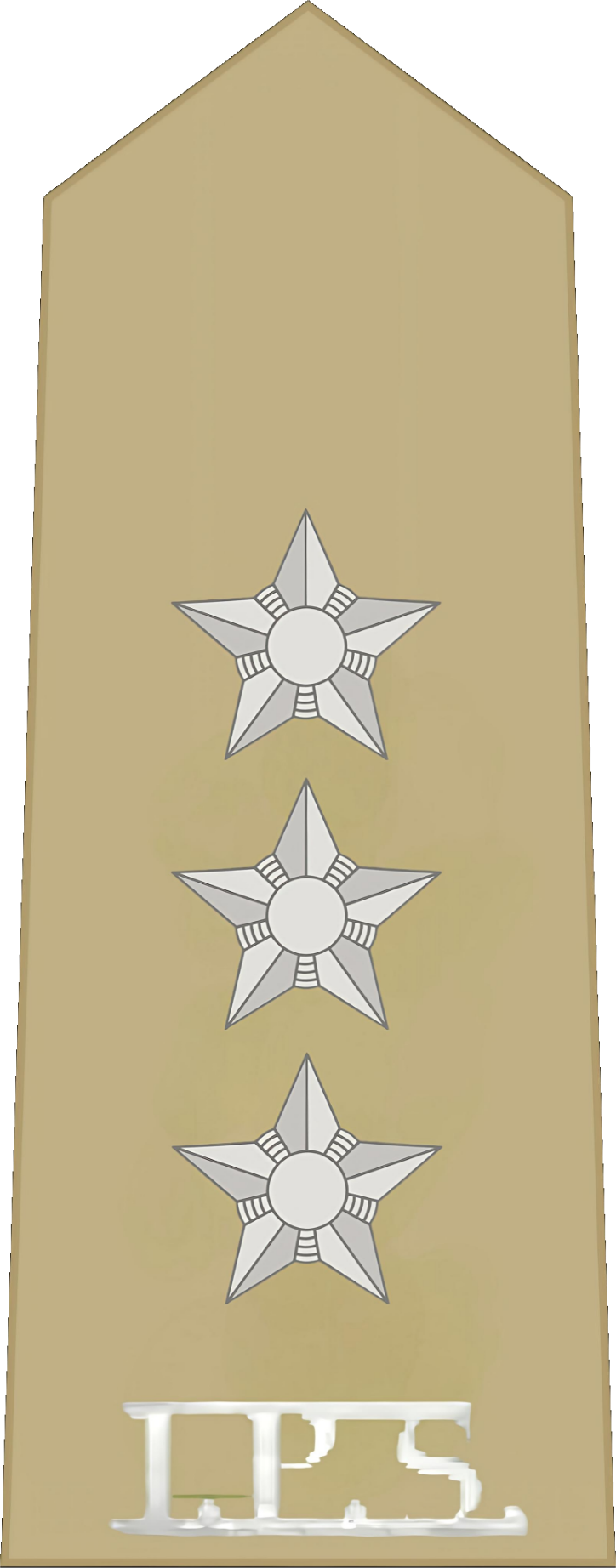
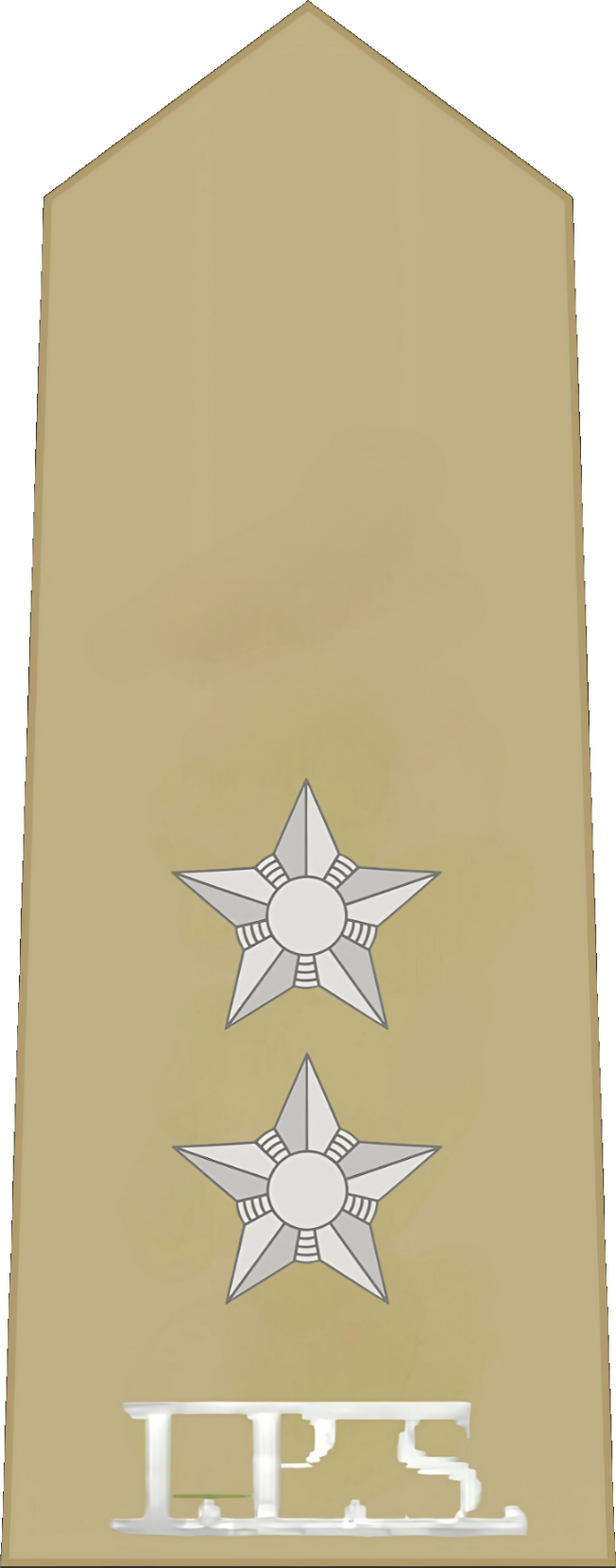
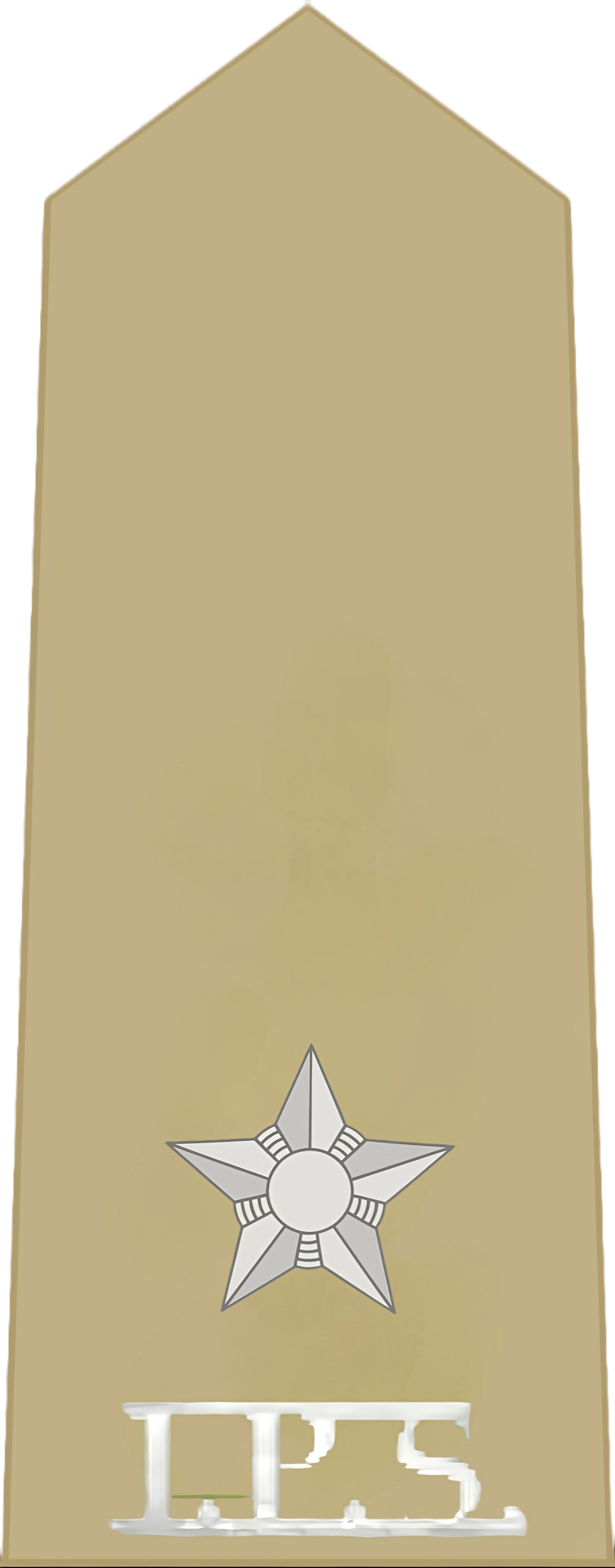
Rank
Director General of Police
Additional Director General of Police (Note: Rank insignia of DGP is similar to Additional DGP.)
Inspector General of Police
Deputy Inspector General of Police
Superintendent of Police (Selection Grade) (Note: The Senior Superintendent of Police (SSP) is a post, not a rank, typically held by an SP (selection grade or junior grade) in states like Uttar Pradesh, Jammu and Kashmir, and Punjab.)
Superintendent of Police
Additional superintendent of police
Assistant Superintendent of Police
Assistant superintendent of police (Probationary for two years)
Assistant Superintendent of Police (Probationary for one year)
Abbreviation
DGP
ADGP
IGP
DIGP
SP (SG)
SP
Addl.SP
ASP
ASP
ASP

- Note 1: The rank insignia of DGP, Spl.DGP, Addl.DGP is the same.
- Note 2: The equivalent rank to the ASP (Asst.SP) in State Police Services is the deputy superintendent of police (DSP/DySP).
- Note 3: The commissioner of police is a post typically held by DIG and above rank officers.

.

Tamil Nadu Police Officers Insignia
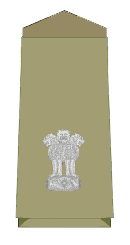
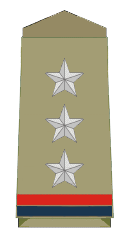
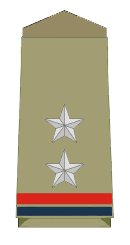
Gazetted Officers
Insignia
Rank	Superintendent of Police (TPS)	Additional Superintendent of Police (TPS)	Deputy Superintendent of Police (TPS)	Inspector of Police (Note: The Inspector of Police is a Group B Gazetted Officer.)
Abbreviation	SP	ADSP	DSP	Insp.
Non-Gazetted Officers
Insignia					No insignia
Rank	Sub Inspector of Police	Special Sub Inspector	Head constable	Constable (Grade I)	Constable (Grade II)
Abbreviation	SI	SSI	HC	PC I	PC II
Note: In Tamil Nadu Special Police, SP, Addl. SP, and DSP are designated as Commandant, Deputy Commandant, and Assistant Commandant, while Head Constable and Grade I Constable are termed Havildar and Naik.

=== Powers and functions ===
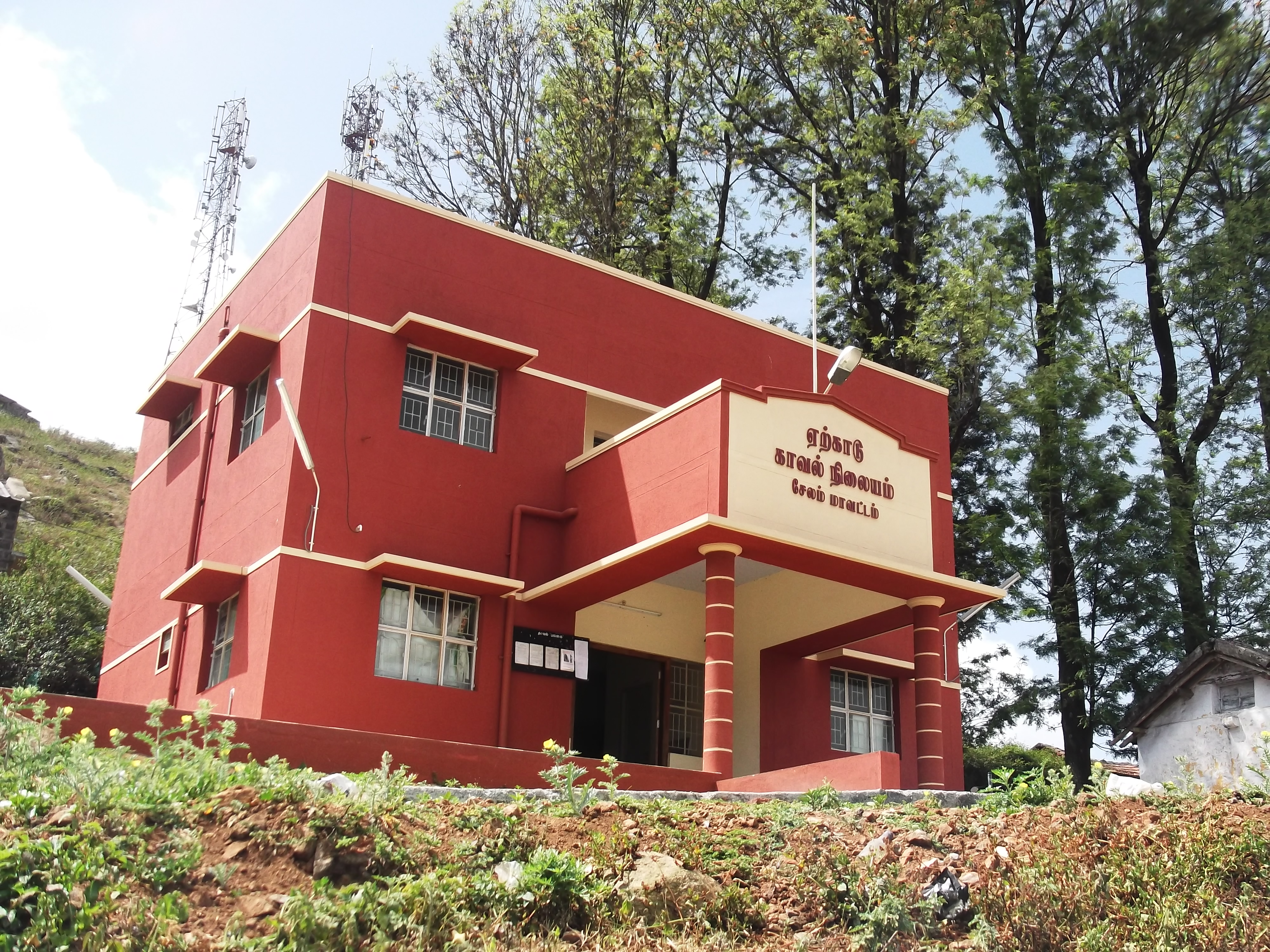
A typical semi-urban police station

The HoPF is the head of the Police force, and is responsible for the overall operations. The various gazetted officers are responsible for the respective functional and administrative units. The police is empowered to investigate crimes within the purview of the law, and can conduct searches, and seize arms and prevented substances.

At a district level, the SP is responsible for the functions to prevent/detect crime, maintain law & order, handle grievances, gather intelligence, and manage HR & finances. The SP oversees discipline, inspections, serious crime investigations, and is responsible for sending reports to higher authorities. Sub-Divisional Police Officers supervise individual police stations, and are responsible for ensuring crime prevention, maintaining discipline, public service standards, and for handling misconduct inquiries in the respective jurisdictions. The Inspectors of the respective functional wings, manage the operations within their purview, with Law & Order responsible for maintaining peace, and prevention of violence, Crime responsible for investigation and prosecution of criminal events, and Traffic responsible for traffic management.

The Station House Officers manage station administration, crime prevention in the respective jurisdiction, and daily reporting. The officers are assisted by Head Constables, who supervise the other constables, manage records, and outposts. While the transfer and postings of DSPs are handled by the HoPF, DSPs, and Commissioners are responsible for such decisions within their jurisdiction.

=== Remuneration ===
The salary structure and monthly remuneration is fixed and specified for all ranks and police staff. Apart from the basic remuneration, there are also provisions for allowances, fuel, maintenance, training, rewards, and contingencies. The police is also eligible for subsidised food grains, access to police canteens, and health insurance. The housing board provides for and is responsible for allocation of government accommodation to police personnel.

== Equipment ==
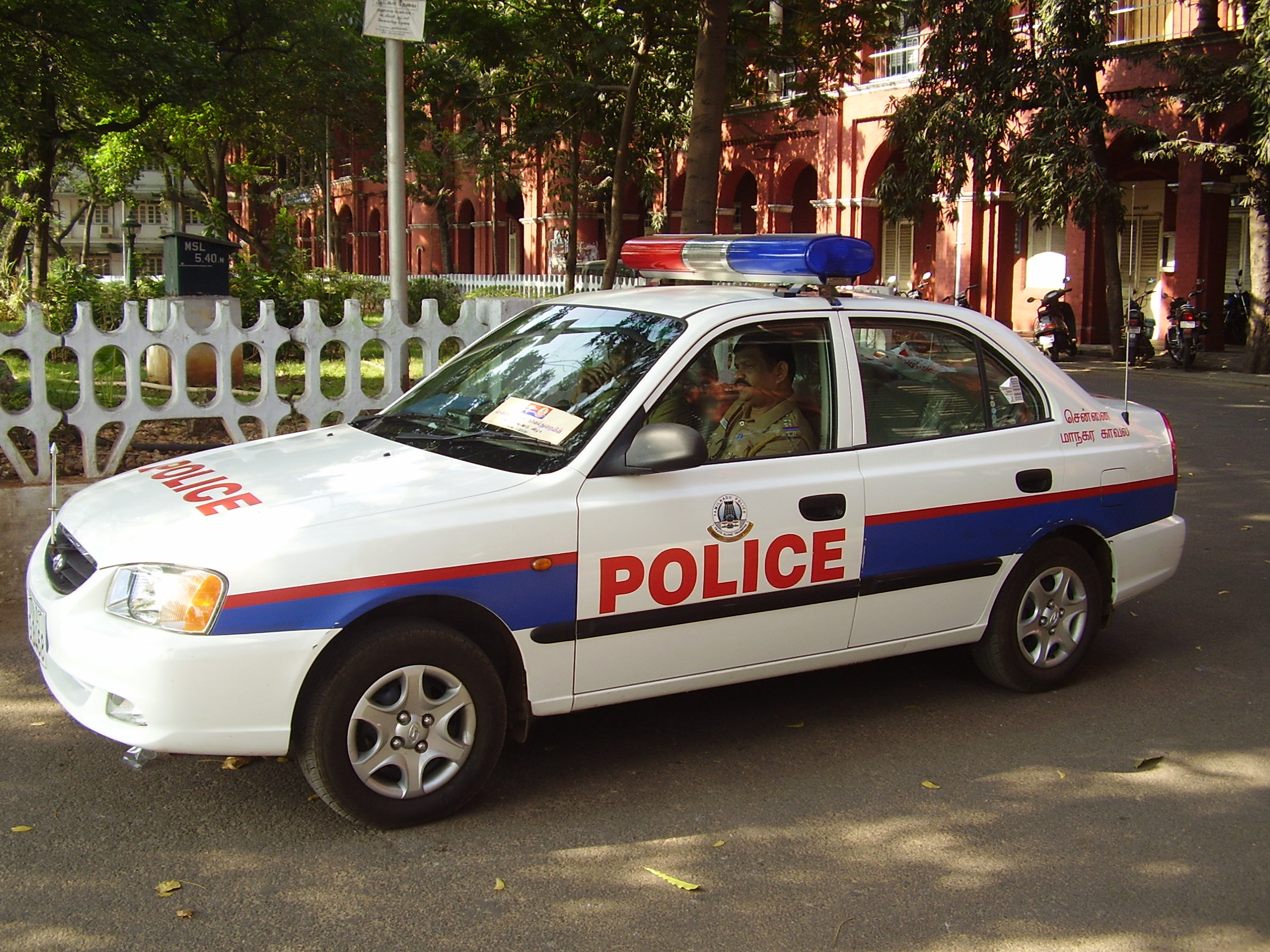
A police patrol car

As per the Arms Act of 1959, designated police officers can carry arms, which should only be used in good faith. Gazetted officers, Inspectors and Sub-Inspectors are permitted to carry government-issued or approved private revolvers or automatic pistols while on duty. Other subordinates such as Head Constables and Constables may be permitted to carry arms supplied by the government only when required to perform official duties. They are authorised to carry a single-barrel muzzle-loading gun.

The special forces are equipped with various weapons such as FN FAL, AK-47, INSAS rifle, Glock pistols, and grenade launchers. They also operate specialised anti-riot vehicles equipped with multi-shell launchers and gas guns for firing teargas shells and smoke grenades. Other equipment used by the police force include Browning pistols, Lee–Enfield rifles, and other Self-loading rifles. The police also operate various surveillance and security equipment like metal and explosive detectors, bullet proof vests, binoculars, night vision goggles, and other communication equipment.

== Notable operations ==
Veerappan was a bandit who was active in the forests along the border region of Tamil Nadu, Karnataka and Kerala in the late 20th century. He defied the state governments and paramilitary forces over a decade, and was wanted for killing more than 100 people including government officials and police officers. He was involved in poaching of elephants and smuggling ivory and sandalwood. In 2004, the Special Task Force of the Tamil Nadu Police launched Operation Cocoon in the Sathyamangalam forests, to capture Veerappan and his associates. The operation, headed by K. Vijay Kumar, and N. K. Senthamarai Kannan, led to the killing of Veerappan on 18 October 2004.

Bawaria robberies were a series of robbery, murder, and assault that were perpetrated in residential areas along various national highways in Tamil Nadu between 1995 and 2005. These cases of organised dacoity were carried out by a group of truck drivers from the Bawaria community. The group looted about ₹20 million (US$210,000) across 24 robberies while killing 13 people, and injuring 63 others during the incidents. The Tamil Nadu Police formed a special investigation team under the aegis of S. R. Jangid to capture the robbers who were wanted in multiple cases across India. The subsequent police operation resulted in the deaths of two, and arrest of eight others including the leader Oma Bawaria in 2005.

On 5 October 2013, the Tamil Nadu Police, along with the Andhra Pradesh Police, conduced Operation Puttur, an anti-terror operation, which captured two terror suspects in Puttur. The suspects, who were part of the banned Al Ummah outfit, were planning to plant bombs at the Tirumala Venkateswara Temple.

== Criticism ==
The Tamil Nadu Police has faced occasional criticism for acts of misconduct, corruption, bias, and custodial deaths.

On 20 June 1992, a team of police, forest officers and revenue officers conducted a raid in the village of Vachathi in Dharmapuri district, while accusing the villagers of aiding Veerappan. The team ransacked the villagers' property, destroyed their houses, killed their cattle, assaulted around 100 villagers, and raped 18 women. After a court order, the Central Bureau of Investigation (CBI) began probing the case. On 29 September 2011, a special court convicted all 269 accused officials including 17 of them for rape. Fifty-four of the original accused had died by the time of the convictions, while the remaining 215 were sentenced to jail.

On 31 August 1995, about 600 men of the Tamil Nadu Police attacked Dalit families in Kodiyankulam village in Thoothukudi district. The officials destroyed properties and food grains, and poisoned the public water sources. They harassed the women, and looted cash and jewellery. While the police reported that the raid was intended to apprehend suspects in a murder investigation and recover explosives and deadly weapons, the police raid was reported to have targeted the Dalits, on the orders of upper caste officials.

On 22 and 23 May 2018, police opened fire on protesters in Thoothukudi during a protest against proposed expansion of a copper smelter plant run by Sterlite. The incident resulted in the deaths of 13 people and left 102 injured. Several policemen were also injured during the protests.

In 2021, the Chennai Police intervened on a complaint by the parents of a lesbian couple, who willingly fled their houses fearing interrogation and harassment. In the subsequent case, the couple approached the Madras High Court, which ruled in their favor and stressed the need to reform the police force and introduce a specific clause among the judiciary and law enforcement while dealing with issues regarding same sex couples.

=== Custodial deaths ===
As per the Ministry of home affairs, there were 172 custodial deaths reported in the state during the period FY 2020-21 to FY 2021-22. On 19 June 2020, P. Jeyaraj and his son Bennicks were arrested by the Tamil Nadu Police at Sathankulam for allegedly keeping their store open past the government stipulated timings. They were tortured in custody, and Bennicks died on 22 June 2020 and P. Jeyaraj died later on 23 June 2020. The case was transferred to the CBI, nine police officers were arrested later, and the Friends of Police, a community initiative, was discontinued in its aftermath. On 28 June 2025, 27-year-old B. Ajith Kumar was illegally taken into custody by the Tamil Nadu Police for investigation into an alleged theft case in Thirupuvanam, Sivaganga. He later died of police torture during the unofficial interrogation. The case was transferred to the CBI after the intervention of the Madras High Court, and at least four policemen were arrested.

== Police Museum ==
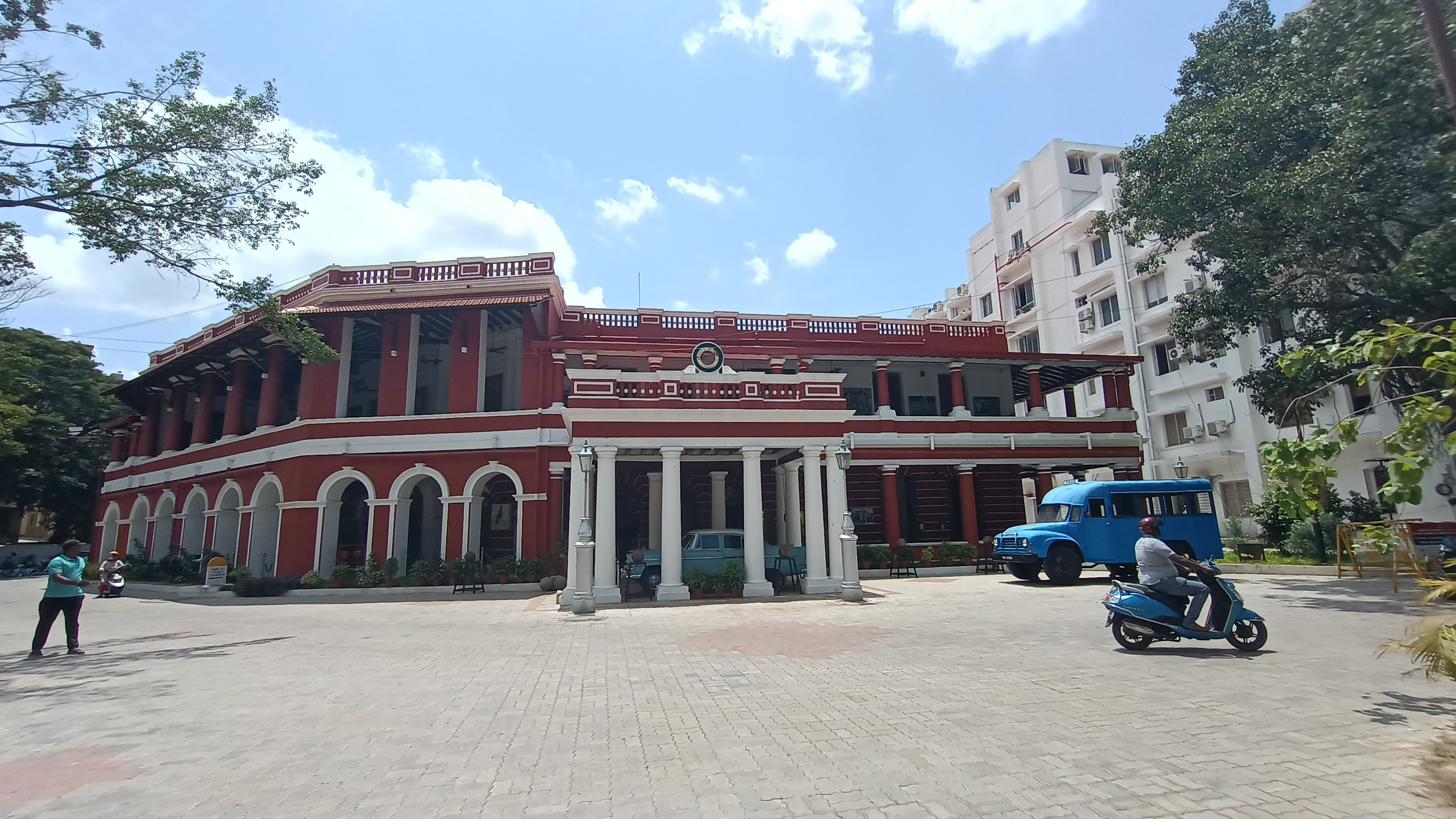
Tamil Nadu Police Museum, Chennai

Tamil Nadu Police Museum was opened in Egmore, Chennai in September 2021. The building, which was constructed in 1842, served as the commissionerate of Chennai Police from 1856 to 2013. After the commissionerate was moved to a new building in Vepery, restoration works began in October 2020 and it was converted into a museum at a cost of ₹64.7 million (US$690,000). The museum displays various relevant to the history of the Tamil Nadu Police since the early 19th century.

== See also ==
- Law enforcement in India
