= Avadi Police =

Avadi Police Commissionerate
- Common name: Avadi City Police
- Motto: Truth alone triumphs

Agency overview
- Formed: 2022
- Preceding agency: Greater Chennai Police

Jurisdictional structure
- Operations jurisdiction: Chennai, Tamil Nadu, India
- Governing body: Department of Home, Government of Tamil Nadu
- General nature: Local civilian police

Operational structure
- Headquarters: Avadi, Chennai
- Elected officer responsible: M. K. Stalin, Chief Minister & Minister for Home Affairs
- Agency executive: K. Shankar IPS, Commissioner of Police, Avadi
- Parent agency: Tamil Nadu Police
- Units: List: Aviation; Emergency Service; Organized Crime Control Bureau; Scuba Team and Harbor; Special Victims; Major Case Squad; Taxi Squad; Movie and Television; School Safety; Real Time Crime; Auxillay Police; Crime Scene; Evidence Collection; Transit Bureau; Housing Bureau; Highway Patrol; Transportation Bureau

Facilities
- Stations: 25

Website
- tnpolice.gov.in

Avadi City Police officially Avadi Police Commissionerate is a city police administration for the north and northwestern neighborhoods and suburbs of Chennai, Tamil Nadu, India. Located in the western neighbourhood of Avadi, it was created by the trifurcation of the Greater Chennai City Police jurisdictions. Tamil Nadu State government created Tambaram and Avadi Police commissionerates in an attempt of reforming greater Chennai city police. Avadi Police Commissionerate was formally inaugurated by Chief Minister M. K. Stalin on 1 January 2022. The newly created Avadi Commissionerate jurisdiction covers twenty-five police stations from the police districts of Avadi and Redhills. It is the second largest police commissionerate in the state of Tamil Nadu next to its preceding agency Greater Chennai Police. The head the agency hold the same rank (ADGP) as the Greater Chennai Police Commissioner.
