= Tiruchirappalli City Police =

Division of the Tamil Nadu Police

- Common name: Trichy City Police
- Motto: Truth alone triumphs

Agency overview
- Formed: 1997
- Preceding agency: Tiruchirappalli District Police
- Employees: 1936

Jurisdictional structure
- Operations jurisdiction: Tiruchirappalli, Tamil Nadu, India
- Governing body: Department of Home, Government of Tamil Nadu
- General nature: Local civilian police

Operational structure
- Headquarters: Trichy Police Commissionerate
- Elected officer responsible: M. K. Stalin, Chief Minister & Minister for Home Affairs
- Agency executive: N. Kanmani IPS, Commissioner of Police, Trichy
- Parent agency: Tamil Nadu Police
- Units: List: Anti Land Grabing Special Cell; Anti Human Trafficking Unit; Anti Vice Squad; Armed Reserve; City Crime Branch; City Crime Records Bureau; Control Room; Court Cell; Cyber Crime Cell; Intelligence Section; Prohibition Enforcement Wing; Security; Serious Crime Squad; Social Justice and Human Rights; Traffic Investigation Wing; Traffic Regulation Wing

Facilities
- Stations: 18

Website
- tnpolice.gov.in

The Tiruchirappalli City Police, also called as Trichy City police, a division of the Tamil Nadu Police is the law enforcement agency for the city of Tiruchirappalli in India. The city police force is headed by a Commissioner of Police and the administrative control vests with the Tamil Nadu Home Department. There are four sub-divisions comprising 18 police stations, including four All Women Police Stations. The city's traffic is managed by the North and South wings of Trichy City Traffic Regulation and Investigation Units. ANPR cameras for Traffic Regulatory Management System were first introduced in Trichy City during 2010.

== History ==
During Pre-Colonial period Kavalar system was prevalent for policing activity. By 1816 the system was abolished and taken over by the District Board. The current policing system in Trichinopoly District headed by a Superintendent was introduced in 1860 under The Madras District Police Act, 1859 after the formation of British Raj in India. After India got independence Madras Police became Tamil Nadu Police and in the year 1977 in order to manage the Policing activity of the Corporation Area of Tiruchirappalli, current City Police Organisation was formed under the head of Commissioner.

== Organisation ==
=== Hierarchy ===
Officers

- Commissioner of Police (COP) in IG Rank
- Deputy Commissioner of Police (DCP) in SP Rank
- Additional Deputy Commissioner of Police (ADC) in ADSP Rank
- Assistant Commissioner of Police (ACP) in ASP/DSP Rank

Subordinates

- Inspector of Police (Insp.)
- Sub-Inspector of Police (SI)
- Special Sub-Inspector of Police (SSI)
- Assistant Sub Inspector of Police (ASI)
- Head Constable (HC)
- Police Constable Grade I (SC)
- Police Constable (PC)

== List of police stations ==
Following are the list of police stations within the jurisdiction of Tiruchirappalli City Police.

Sl. No	Range	Station code	Station name	Function
1	Fort		Gandhi Market	L&O, Crime
2	Fort		Fort	L&O, Crime
3	Fort	B2	Palakkarai	
4	Fort		Fort AWPS	
5	Cantonment	C1	Cantonment	L&O, Crime
6	Cantonment	C3	K.K. Nagar	L&O, Crime
7	Cantonment		Session Court	
8	Cantonment	B9	Edamalaipatti Pudur	
9	Cantonment		Cantonment AWPS	
10	Golden Rock		Airport	
11	Golden Rock		Golden Rock	
12	Golden Rock	D3	Ariyamangalam	
13	Golden Rock		Golden Rock AWSP	
14	Srirangam		Srirangam	L&O, Crime
15	Srirangam	B7	Woraiyur	L&O, Crime
16	Srirangam	E3	Government Hospital	
17	Srirangam		Srirangam AWPS	
18	Srirangam	E4	Thillai Nagar	
19	Trichy		TIW North	Traffic
20	Trichy		TIW South	Traffic
21	Trichy		PEW Trichy	Prohibition
22	Trichy		CCB Trichy	Crime
