= Tambaram City Police =

Division of the Tamil Nadu Police

Tambaram Police Commissionerate
- Logo of the Tambaram City Police
- Common name: Tambaram City Police
- Motto: Truth alone triumphs

Agency overview
- Formed: 2022
- Preceding agency: Greater Chennai Police

Jurisdictional structure
- Operations jurisdiction: Tambaram, Tamil Nadu, India
- Governing body: Department of Home, Government of Tamil Nadu
- General nature: Local civilian police

Operational structure
- Headquarters: Melakottaiyur, Tambaram (Temporary)
- Elected officer responsible: C. Joseph Vijay, Chief Minister & Minister for Home Affairs
- Agency executive: Sanjay Kumar IPS, Commissioner of Police, Tambaram
- Parent agency: Tamil Nadu Police
- Units: List: Aviation; Emergency Service; Organized Crime Control Bureau; Scuba Team and Harbor; Special Victims; Major Case Squad; Taxi Squad; Movie and Television; School Safety; Real Time Crime; Auxillay Police; Crime Scene; Evidence Collection; Transit Bureau; Housing Bureau; Highway Patrol; Transportation Bureau

Facilities
- Stations: 25

Website
- tnpolice.gov.in

Tambaram City Police, officially Tambaram Police Commissionerate, is a city police administration for the city of Tambaram located within the Chennai Metropolitan Area in the Indian State of Tamil Nadu.

It is the third largest police commissionerate in the state of Tamil Nadu next to Greater Chennai Police and Avadi City Police. The agency executive holds the rank of Additional Director General of Police, which is same as that of the Greater Chennai Police Commissioner.

== History ==
The Tambaram City Police was established through the division of the Greater Chennai Police jurisdiction, as part of the Tamil Nadu State government's efforts to reform the policing structure, resulting in the creation of the Tambaram and Avadi Police commissionerates. On 1 January 2022, Tambaram City Police was formally established by State Government of Tamil Nadu.

When the Tambaram City Police was initially established, it encompassed twenty police stations from the Tambaram and Pallikaranai police districts.

== Administration ==
The Administrative Structure of Tambaram City Police as follows:

Police District	Police Range	Police Station Name	Station Type
Tambaram	Tambaram	Tambaram Police Station	Law & Order
Tambaram	Tambaram	Chrompet Police Station	Law & Order
Tambaram	Tambaram	Tambaram Traffic Police Station	Traffic
Tambaram	Tambaram	Chrompet Traffic Police Station	Traffic
Tambaram	Tambaram	Tambaram All Women Police Station	Woman
Tambaram	Pallavaram	Pallavaram Police Station	Law & Order
Tambaram	Pallavaram	Shankar Nagar Police Station	Law & Order
Tambaram	Pallavaram	Kundrathur Police Station	Law & Order
Tambaram	Pallavaram	Thirumudivakkam Police Station	Law & Order
Tambaram	Pallavaram	Pallavaram Traffic Police Station	Traffic
Tambaram	Pallavaram	Shankar Nagar Traffic Police Station	Traffic
Tambaram	Pallavaram	Pallavaram All Woman Police Station	Woman
Tambaram	Guduvanchery	Guduvanchery Police Station	Law & Order
Tambaram	Guduvanchery	Peerkkankaranai Police Station	Law & Order
Tambaram	Guduvanchery	Otteri Police Station	Law & Order
Tambaram	Guduvanchery	Maraimalai Nagar Police Station	Law & Order
Tambaram	Guduvanchery	Singaperumal Koil Police Station	Law & Order
Tambaram	Guduvanchery	Guduvanchery Traffic Police Station	Traffic
Tambaram	Guduvanchery	Peerkankaranai Traffic Police Station	Traffic
Tambaram	Guduvanchery	Otteri Traffic Police Station	Traffic
Tambaram	Guduvanchery	Maraimalai Nagar Traffic Police Station	Traffic
Tambaram	Guduvanchery	Vandalur All Women Police Station	Woman
Tambaram	Manimangalam	Manimangalam Police Station	Law & Order
Tambaram	Manimangalam	Padappai Police Station	Law & Order
Tambaram	Manimangalam	Somangalam Police Station	Law & Order
Tambaram	Manimangalam	Manimangalam Traffic Police Station	Traffic
Pallikaranai	Semmancherry	Semmancherry Police Station	Law & Order
Pallikaranai	Semmancherry	Kannagi Nagar Police Station	Law & Order
Pallikaranai	Semmancherry	Perumbakkam Police Station	Law & Order
Pallikaranai	Semmancherry	Semmancherry Traffic Police Station	Traffic
Pallikaranai	Semmancherry	Kannagi Nagar Traffic Police Station	Traffic
Pallikaranai	Semmancherry	Perumbakkam Traffic Police Station	Traffic
Pallikaranai	Kelambakkam	Kelambakkam Police Station	Law & Order
Pallikaranai	Kelambakkam	Kanathur Police Station	Law & Order
Pallikaranai	Kelambakkam	Thazhambur Police Station	Law & Order
Pallikaranai	Kelambakkam	Kelambakkam Traffic Police Station	Traffic
Pallikaranai	Kelambakkam	Kanathur Traffic Police Station	Traffic
Pallikaranai	Selaiyur	Selaiyur Police Station	Law & Order
Pallikaranai	Selaiyur	Pallikaranai Police Station	Law & Order
Pallikaranai	Selaiyur	Medavakkam Police Station	Law & Order
Pallikaranai	Selaiyur	Chitlapakkam Police Station	Law & Order
Pallikaranai	Selaiyur	Selaiyur Traffic Police Station	Traffic
Pallikaranai	Selaiyur	Pallikaranai Traffic Police Station	Traffic
Pallikaranai	Selaiyur	Selaiyur All Women Police Station	Woman

== Commissioners of Police ==
Council (Term)	No.	Name	Term		Appointer
Council (Term)	No.	Name	Start	End	Appointer
1st (2022 — 2027)	1	M. Ravi	1 January 2022	31 May 2022	21st Cabinet of State of Tamil Nadu
1st (2022 — 2027)	2	A. Amalraj	6 June 2022	9 July 2024	21st Cabinet of State of Tamil Nadu
1st (2022 — 2027)	3	Abin Dinesh Modak	10 July 2024	Incumbent	21st Cabinet of State of Tamil Nadu
