= Greater Chennai Police =

Division of the Tamil Nadu Police

- Logo of the Greater Chennai Police
- Common name: Chennai Police
- Motto: Truth alone triumphs

Agency overview
- Formed: 1659
- Preceding agency: Chennai Suburban Police Chennai City Police
- Employees: 23625

Jurisdictional structure
- Operations jurisdiction: Chennai, Tamil Nadu, India
- Governing body: Department of Home, Government of Tamil Nadu
- General nature: Local civilian police

Operational structure
- Headquarters: Chennai Police Commissionerate
- Elected officer responsible: C. Joseph Vijay, Chief Minister & Minister for Home Affairs
- Agency executive: A. Amalraj IPS, Commissioner of Police, Chennai
- Parent agency: Tamil Nadu Police
- Units: List: Law & Order; Central Crime Branch; Intelligence Section; Traffic Police; Crime Against Women and Children; Headquarters; Motor Transport; Armed Reserve; Cyber Crime Cell

Facilities
- Stations: 132

Website
- tnpolice.gov.in

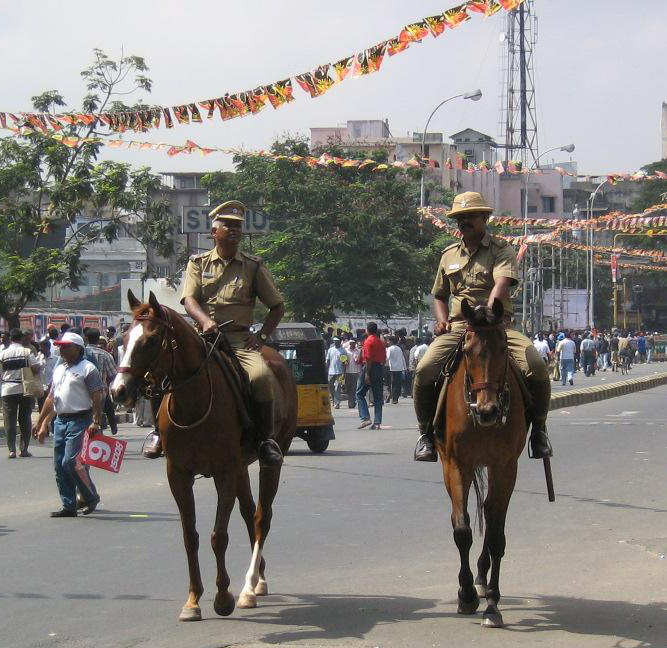
Chennai City Mounted Police officers patrolling in their khaki colored uniform during a cricket match.

The Greater Chennai Police, a division of the Tamil Nadu Police, is the law enforcement agency for the city of Chennai in India and the surrounding area. The city police force is headed by a Commissioner of Police and the administrative control vests with the Tamil Nadu Home Department. There are four sub-divisions of the Greater Chennai Police, and 104 police stations. The city's traffic is managed by the Greater Chennai Traffic Police. Chennai is the first city in India to introduce e-Beat system used to measure the daily routine and performance of the police personnel.

== History ==
In 1659, when Chennai (then called Madras) was just a group of fishing villages, Pedda Naik formed a group of peons to guard the town. By 1780 the post of Superintendent of Police was created to manage the markets. After the Indian Rebellion of 1857, the British Raj in India formed the modern Madras Police as part of its reforms.

The Chennai City Traffic Police is a branch of the Greater Chennai Police, with the mission of regulating traffic in the city of Chennai. It was established in 1929 when the Police department was split into 3, namely, Law & Order, Crime and Traffic. As of 2011, the government merged Chennai Suburban Police with Chennai city police to form The Greater Chennai Police Commissionerate.

== Organisation ==
=== Structure ===
- Commissioner of Police, Greater Chennai
  - Additional Commissioner of Police, Headquarters
    - Joint Commissioner of Police, Headquarters
      - Deputy Commissioner of Police, Headquarters
      - Deputy Commissioner of Police, Admin
      - Deputy Commissioner of Police, Welfare and Estate
  - Additional Commissioner of Police, Law & Order (North)
    - Joint Commissioner of Police, Law & Order (North Zone)
      - Deputy Commissioner of Police, Flower Bazaar
      - Deputy Commissioner of Police, Washermenpet
      - Deputy Commissioner of Police, High Court
    - Joint Commissioner of Police, Law & Order (West Zone)
      - Deputy Commissioner of Police, Koyambedu
      - Deputy Commissioner of Police, Anna Nagar
      - Deputy Commissioner of Police, Pulianthope
      - Deputy Commissioner of Police, Kolathur
  - Additional Commissioner of Police, Law & Order (South)
    - Joint Commissioner of Police, Law & Order (South Zone)
      - Deputy Commissioner of Police, Adyar
      - Deputy Commissioner of Police, T. Nagar
      - Deputy Commissioner of Police, St. Thomas Mount
    - Joint Commissioner of Police, Law & Order (East Zone)
      - Deputy Commissioner of Police, Mylapore
      - Deputy Commissioner of Police, Kilpauk
      - Deputy Commissioner of Police, Triplicane
  - Additional Commissioner of Police, Traffic
    - Joint Commissioner of Police, Traffic (North Zone)
      - Deputy Commissioner of Police, Traffic North
      - Deputy Commissioner of Police, Traffic West
    - Joint Commissioner of Police, Traffic (South Zone)
      - Deputy Commissioner of Police, Traffic South
      - Deputy Commissioner of Police, Traffic East
  - Additional Commissioner of Police, Central Crime Branch
    - Deputy Commissioner of Police, CCB - I
    - Deputy Commissioner of Police, CCB - II
    - Deputy Commissioner of Police, CCB - III
  - Joint Commissioner of Police, Intelligence Section
    - Deputy Commissioner of Police - I, Intelligence Section
    - Deputy Commissioner of Police - II, Intelligence Section
  - Deputy Commissioner of Police, Security
  - Deputy Commissioner of Police, Crime Against Women and Children

=== Ranks ===
Category	Designation	Abbreviation	Equivalent Rank	Rank insignia
Officers	Commissioner of Police	CP	ADGP	
Officers	Additional Commissioner of Police	Addl. CP	IG	
Officers	Joint Commissioner of Police	Jt. CP	DIG	
Officers	Deputy Commissioner of Police	DCP	SP	
Officers	Additional Deputy Commissioner of Police	ADC	ADSP	
Officers	Assistant Commissioner of Police	ACP	Assistant SP / DSP	
Subordinates	Inspector of Police	Insp.	Same as in district police.	
Subordinates	Sub-Inspector of Police	SI	Same as in district police.	
Subordinates	Special Sub-Inspector of Police	SSI	Same as in district police.	
Subordinates	Assistant Sub-Inspector of Police	ASI	Same as in district police.	
Subordinates	Head Constable	HC	Same as in district police.	(Shirt sleeve insignia)
Subordinates	Police Constable Grade I	PC Gr I	Same as in district police.	–
Subordinates	Police Constable	PC	Same as in district police.	—

== Achievements ==
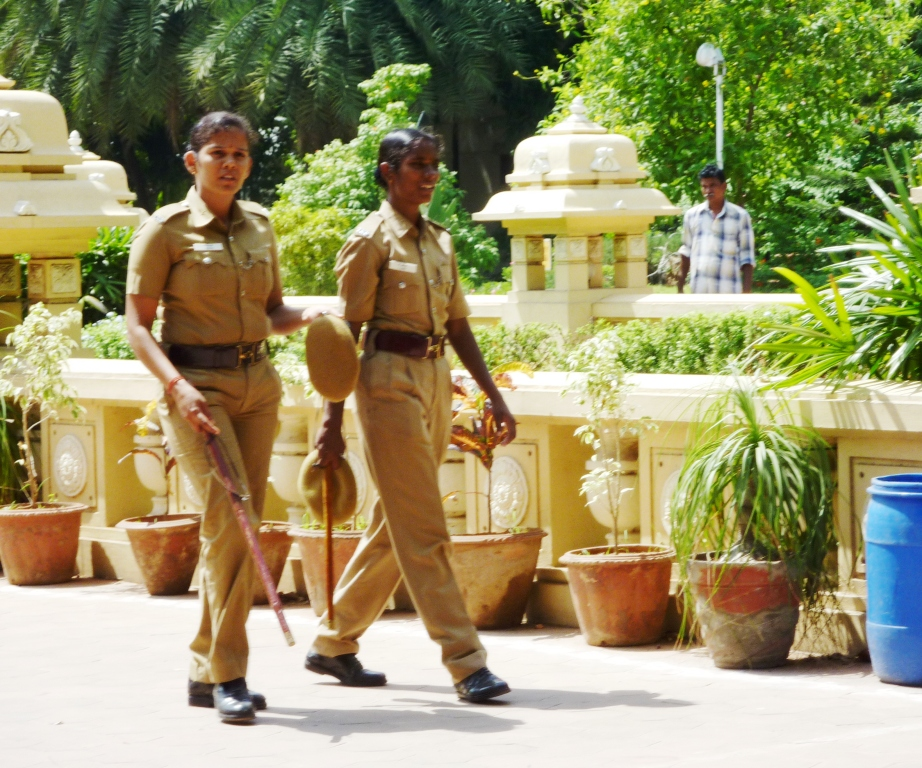
Police women in Chennai, India in 2010

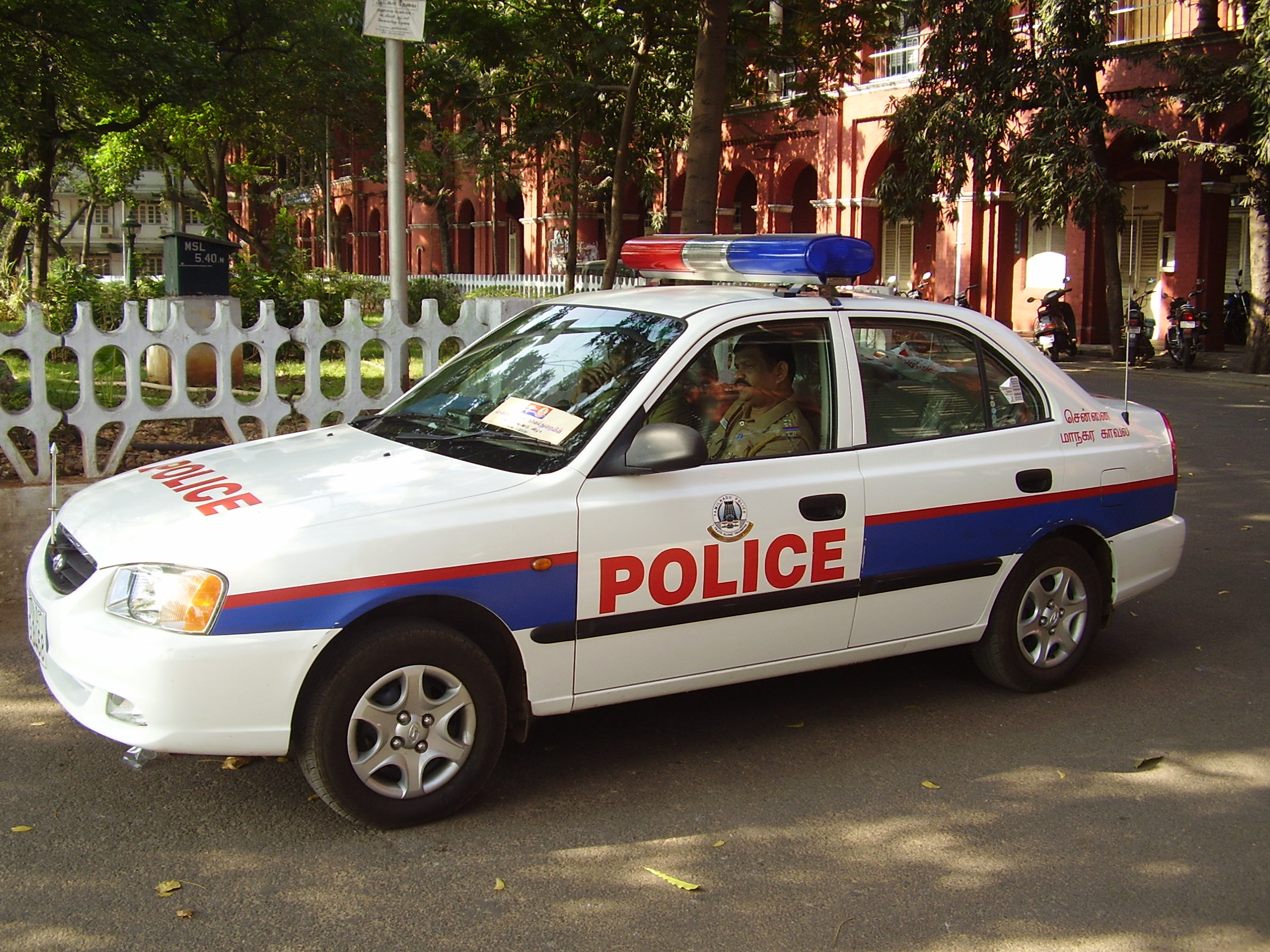
Chennai Police Hyundai Accent patrol car

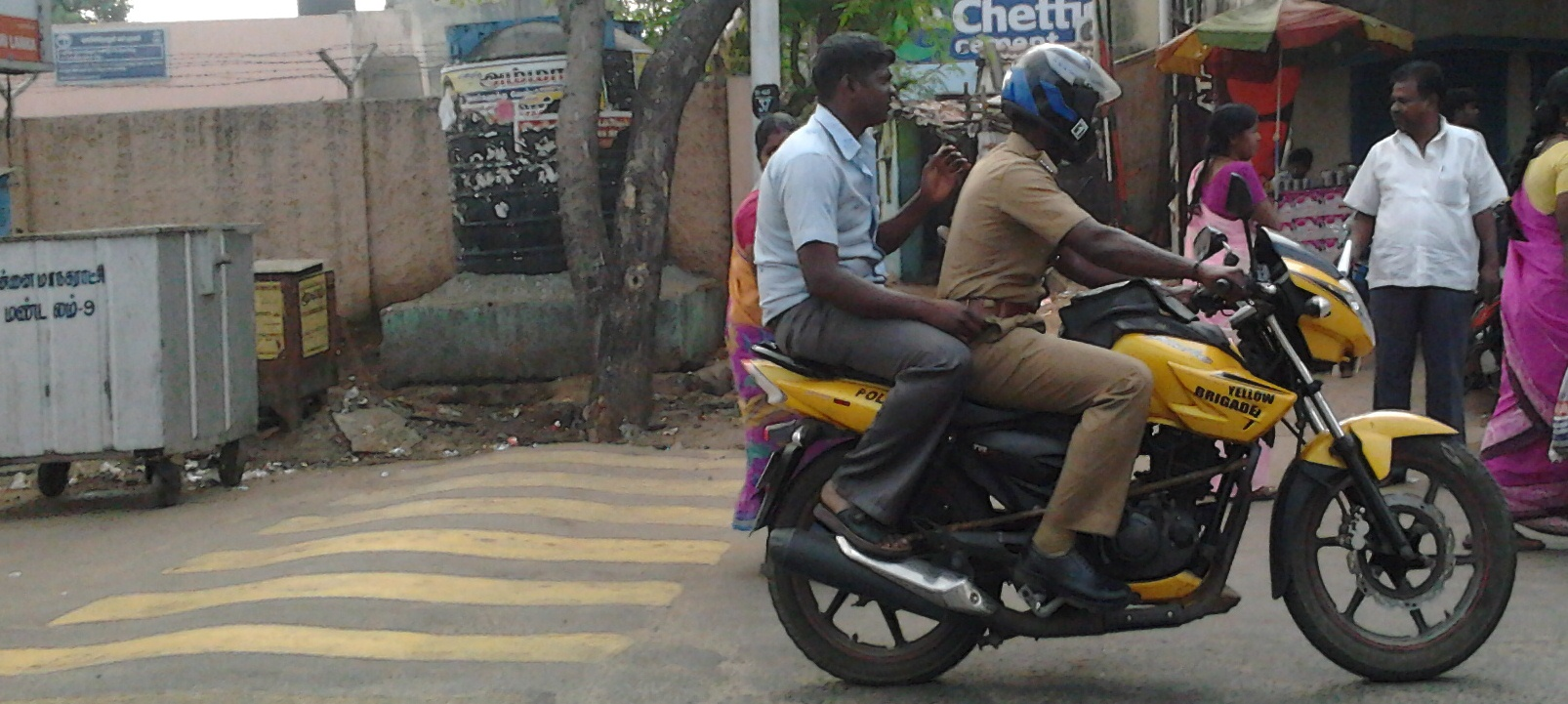
Chennai City Police's Yellow Brigade

Additional Yellow Brigades & Blue Brigades motorcycles and patrol vehicles have been introduced in Greater Chennai. Each Yellow Brigade covers a distance of 2 km^{2} approximately during daytime from 6 am to 9 pm. The Blue Brigade covers the same distance of 2 km^{2} during nighttime from 11 pm to 6.30 am. The patrol vehicles cover an approximate distance of 3.2 km^{2} each day. For patrol duty, 40 Jeeps have been provided equipped with police sirens, revolving lights, public address system, fire extinguisher, top search light, police display light and wireless communication system. The response time to control room calls has been brought down to 3–4 minutes. The Tamil Nadu Police claim that the crime rate in the Greater Chennai City has come down considerably after these initiatives.

The police force include 100 Hyundai Accent patrol cars that were donated by the Hyundai Motor Company, whose factory is located in Sriperumbudur, on the outskirts of the city. The cars are fitted with digital cameras, wireless communication devices and loudspeakers, making this the only police force in the country to use sedan patrol cars. Patrol cars have been provided to Greater Chennai Police. Hyundai donated Accent cars to Chennai Police, of which 75 were given to Law & Order, 21 to traffic department. The remaining 4 cars were incorporated into the Chief Minister's convoy.

== List of police stations ==
Following are the new list of delimitation police stations within the jurisdiction of Chennai Metropolitan Police.

Sn	Station code	Station name
1	E4	Abhiramapuram
2	S8	Adambakkam
3	J2	Adyar
4	K3	Aminjikarai
5	K4	Anna Nagar
6	D2	Annasalai
7	D6	Anna Square
8	K8	Arumbakkam
9	R3	Ashok Nagar
10	K2	Ayanavaram
11	P4	Basin Bridge
12	S2	Chennai Airport
13	G7	Chetpet
14	F1	Chintadripet
15	F5	Choolaimedu
16	K11	CMBT
17	F2	Egmore
18	C2	Elephant Gate
19	B2	Esplanade
20	N4	Fishing Harbour
21	C1	Flower Bazaar
22	E5	Foreshore Estate
23	B3	Fort St. George
24	D7	Govt. Estate/M.G.R. Memorial
25	C4	Govt. Hospital
26	E6	Govt. Royapettah Hospital
27	J3	Guindy
28	B5	Harbour
29	B4	High Court
30	D3	Ice House
31	K7	I.C.F.
32	G4	Institute of Mental Health
33	V3	J.J. Nagar
34	N2	Kasimedu
35	D8	K.G. Hospital
36	G3	Kilpauk
37	R7	K.K. Nagar
38	G6	KMC Hospital
39	R2	Kodambakkam
40	P6	Kodungaiyur
41	V6	Kolathur
42	H4	Korukkupet
43	C5	Kothavalchavadi
44	J4	Kotturpuram
45	K10	Koyambedu
46	R6	Kumaran Nagar
47	M1	Madhavaram
48	S7	Madipakkam
49	T4	Maduravoyal
50	R1	Mambalam
51	D5	Marina
52	F7	Maternity Hospital
53	S3	Meenambakkam
54	R10	MGR Nagar
55	P5	MKB Nagar
56	F6	Museum
57	N3	Muthialpet
58	E1	Mylapore
59	S4	Nandambakkam
60	J8	Neelankarai
61	H5	New Washermenpet
62	B1	North Beach
63	V7	Nolambur
64	F3	Nungambakkam
65	P2	Otteri
66	S9	Palavanthangal
67	K5	Peravellore
68	G2	Periamet
69	H7	Peripheral Hospital
70	B6	Port Marine
71	P1	Pulianthope
72	M3	Puzhal
73	V4	Rajamangalam
74	H6	R.K Nagar
75	R11	Ramapuram (Royala Nagar)
76	E2	Royapettah
77	N1	Royapuram
78	N5	Rsrm Hospital
79	J1	Saidapet
80	J5	Sastri Nagar
81	G5	Secretariat Colony
82	K1	Sembium
83	C3	Seven Wells
84	R4	Soundarapandiyanar Angadi (Pondy Bazaar)
85	H2	Stanley Hospital
86	S1	St. Thomas Mount
87	J13	Taramani
88	E3	Teynampet
89	K9	Thiru Vi Ka Nagar
90	V5	Thirumangalam
91	J6	Thiruvanmiyur
92	H8	Thiruvotriyur
93	J9	Thoraipakkam
94	F4	Thousand Lights
95	H3	Tondiarpet
96	K6	TP Chathiram
97	D1	Triplicane
98	R8	Vadapalani
99	R9	Valasaravakkam
100	T5	Vanagaram
101	J7	Velachery
102	G1	Vepery
103	V1	Villivakkam
104	R5	Virugambakkam
105	P3	Vyasarpadi
106	H1	Washermanpet
107	D4	Zam Bazaar
