= Kodiyankulam =

Kodiyankulam கொடியங்குளம்
- Village
- Location in Tamil Nadu, India
- Coordinates: 8.842260°N 77.831560°E
- Country: India
- State: Tamil Nadu
- District: Thoothukudi
- Taluk: Ottapidaram

Languages
  - Official: Tamil
- Time zone: UTC+5:30 (IST)
- PIN: 628303

Kodiyankulam is a panchayat town in Thoothukudi district in the Indian state of Tamil Nadu. It is located at a distance of 11 km from Tiruvaikuntam, 21 km from Tirunelveli, 43 km from Thoothukudi, 77 km from Tenkasi and 147 km from Madurai.

== Demographics ==
- Kodiyankulam had a population of 3,146 as per the 2011 census, out of which 1514 are males while 1632 are females in the town.
- Population of Children with age of 0-6 is 272 which is 8.65% of total population of the town.
- The female sex ratio is of 1078 against the Tamil Nadu state average of 996.
- The Literacy rate of the town is 78.8% against the state average of 80.09%. The male literacy is around 83.49% while female literacy rate is 74.45% .
- The Schedule Caste (SC) constitutes about 74.83% of the population in the town.

== In popular media ==
The storyline of the movie Karnan is loosely influenced by 1995 Kodiyankulam violence happened at the village.

== Politics ==
It is part of Ottapidaram Assembly constituency, which comes under the Thoothukkudi Parliamentary constituency.

== See also ==
- 1995 Kodiyankulam violence
