= Coimbatore City Police =

Municipal law enforcement in Coimbatore

Coimbatore City Police கோயம்புத்தூர் மாநகர காவல்
- Abbreviation: CCP

Jurisdictional structure
- Operations jurisdiction: Coimbatore, IN
- Legal jurisdiction: Coimbatore Municipal Corporation and it's suburbs
- Governing body: Government of Tamil Nadu
- General nature: Local civilian police

Operational structure
- Headquarters: Coimbatore, Tamil Nadu, India
- Elected officer responsible: C. Joseph Vijay, Chief Minister of Tamil Nadu
- Agency executive: N. Kannan IPS (IGP), Commissioner of Police
- Parent agency: Tamil Nadu Police

Website
- coimbatorecitypolice.tn.gov.in

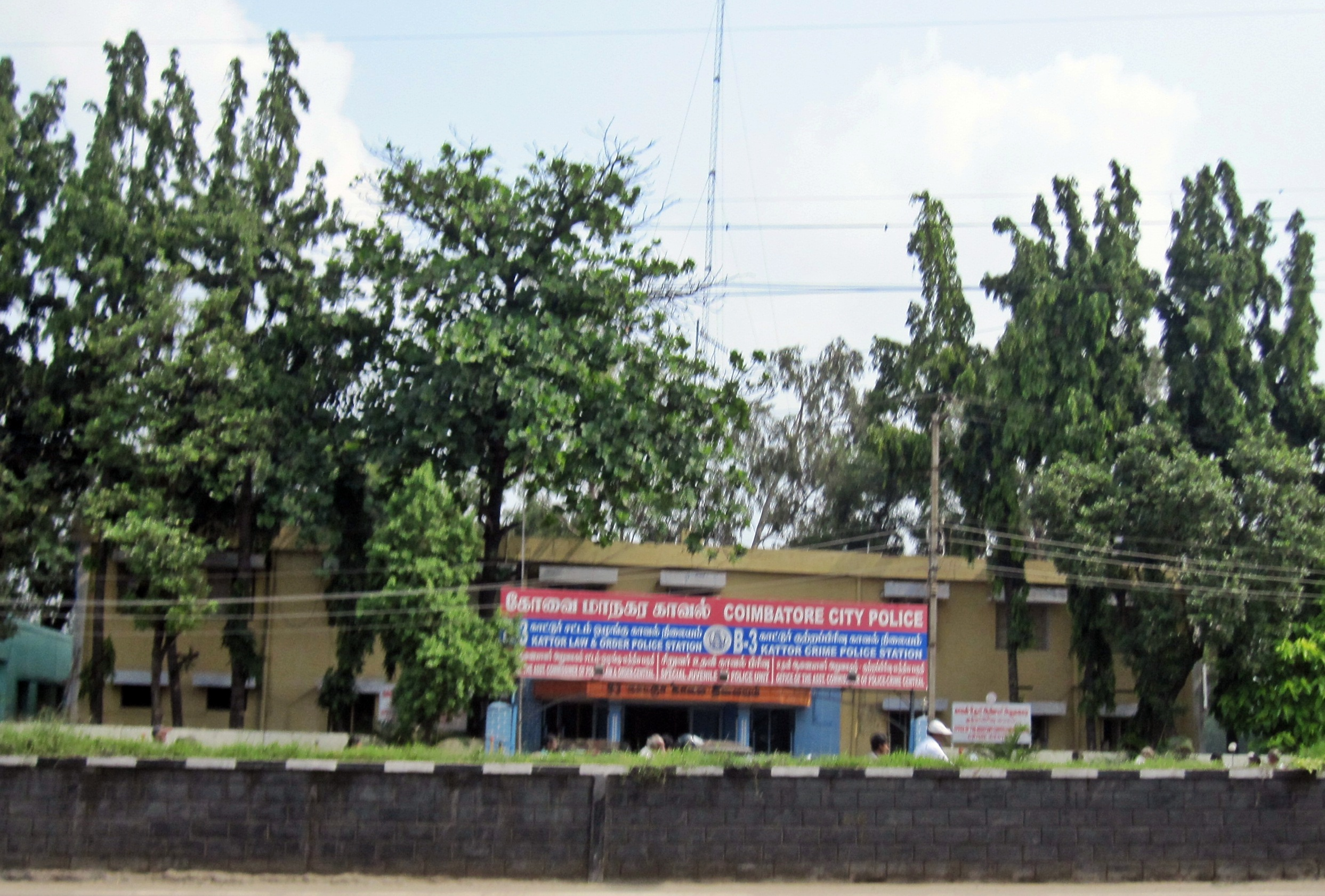
Kattoor Police Station

The Coimbatore City Police (or CCP) is the law enforcement agency in the city of Coimbatore, India. The CCP works under the jurisdiction of the Tamil Nadu Police.

The CCP has three wings: traffic, law and order, and crime. Each of these wings comes under four zones: Central, South, east and West. In 2012, a Cyber Crime cell was set up to crack cases such as fraudulent emails and Nigerian scams. It also has an Anti-Human Trafficking unit that was established in 2013 to help combat trafficking of women and children.

== History ==
The Coimbatore City Police was formed in 1972 after the bifurcation of the existing Coimbatore Police Force into the Coimbatore Urban Police and the Coimbatore Rural Police. In 1982–1983, the Police Commissionerate of Coimbatore city was mooted in order to help combat crime. A law was enacted in 1987 to empower the commissionerate with the same powers as the Madras Police. Coimbatore was fully upgraded into a police commissionerate in 1990.

== Jurisdiction ==
The jurisdiction of the Commissionerate of Police extends to the jurisdictional limits of the Coimbatore City Municipal Corporation. In 2011, when the limits of the Municipal Corporation were increased, the jurisdiction of the police was also increased to include newly added areas. The police issues arms licences to residents of the city. These licences expire at the end of the Calendar year and must be renewed.

The Police stations affiliated to each zone are:

- West Zone
1. B1 - Big Bazaar Street
2. B2 - R. S. Puram
3. B3 - Variety Hall Road
4. B4 - Ukkadam
- Central Zone
1. C1 - Katoor
2. C2 - Race Course
3. C3 - Saibaba Colony
4. C4 - Rathinapuri
- South Zone
1. D1 - Ramanathapuram
2. D2 - Selvapuram
3. D3 - Podanur
4. D4 - Kuniyamuthur
- East Zone
1. E1 - Singanallur
2. E2 - Peelamedu
3. E3 - Saravanampatti

== Infrastructure ==
In 2010, all the police stations across the city were given an advanced scientific investigation kit to help collect medical and forensic evidence without disturbing evidence.

The Coimbatore City Traffic Police is one of the many police divisions in India that uses handheld GPRS-enabled devices to catch offenders and criminals.

Coimbatore is the second city in Tamil Nadu after Chennai to be link to the State Government's Crime and Criminal Tracking Networking System.

Coimbatore, along with Chennai and Madurai are the police forces under the Tamil Nadu police that have replaced the existing VHF-based communication with Terrestrial Trunked Radio (TETRA).

There are 18 police stations in Coimbatore City, numbered B-1 to B-15 along with three "All-Women" Police stations.

Currently, the following units are functioning under the administrative/operation control of the Coimbatore City commissioner of police: city police office, intelligence section, sub-division offices, police stations, all women police stations, traffic police stations, armed reserve, armed reserve motor transport, armoury, city crime records bureau, city crime branch, social justice and human rights unit, police radio branch, prohibition enforcement wing, detective dog squad, mobile forensic science lab, police photo section, short hand beaureu, home guard, traffic wardens, friends of police, and city vigilance committee.
