= Chennai Police Commissionerate =

Building in India

- Interactive map of the Chennai Police Commissionerate area

General information
- Type: Administrative building
- Architectural style: Modernism
- Location: Poonamallee High Road, Chennai, India, Vepery, Chennai, Tamil Nadu 600 007
- Coordinates: 13.0812°N 80.2633°E
- Construction started: 2009
- Completed: 2013
- Inaugurated: 18 October 2013
- Cost: ₹ 254.6 million
- Owner: Chennai City Police

Technical details
- Floor count: 9
- Floor area: 173,000 sq ft

The Chennai City Police Commissionerate building is a 9-storied building on Poonamallee High Road at Vepery, Chennai. It houses the office of the commissioner of Chennai city police.

== History ==
The commissionerate was originally headquartered in Vepery until 1842, when it moved, along with its various departments, to a historic building on Pantheon Road, Egmore, which remained the administrative centre of the city police for over 170 years, until 2013. The property, a bungalow in a paddy field, was bought by Arunagiri Mudaliar for ₹ 36,000. On 1 May 1842, the city police moved into the bungalow for a monthly rent of ₹ 165. The two-storied building is a classic colonial bungalow with Doric columns and Madras terrace. In 1856, when Lt. Col. J.C. Boulderson of 35 regiment of Native infantry took charge as the first police commissioner of Chennai, the land and bungalow was leased to the police department for ₹ 21,000 for a period of 99 years.

For a brief period from 1882, the office was said to have moved to a building on Police Commissioner Office Road and then back to the bungalow. However, the historic records remain obscure. The building on Police Commissioner Office Road, which currently houses the police photographer's department, has a circular plaque with the inscription "Colonel W.S. Drever CSI Commissioner of Police, R.F. Chisholm, architect" and the year 1882 inscribed on it. It is still unclear to historians as to why and when the office moved from Pantheon Road to Police Commissioner Office Road and then back.

The new commissionerate was opened by the Tamil Nadu Chief Minister J. Jayalalithaa on 18 October 2013.

After the departments are completed shifted to the new building, the commissioner office in Egmore is expected to be converted into a police museum.

== The building ==
The building has 9 floors with a total built-up area of 173,000 sq ft, built on 5.49 acres of land. Construction began in 2009 and the work was completed in 2013 at a cost of over ₹ 254.6 million. The building has a basement parking facility for vehicles.

== Offices at the new commissionerate ==
The ground floor of the building houses the public grievances redressal hall, passport verification zone and a reception area. Alongside the cyber crime lab, the elite special unit of the city police, the CCB with its 17 departments, occupy the first and second floors. The third, fourth, and fifth floors house various administrative wings of the city police staffed by deputy commissioners. An anti-terror cell (ATC), with specialised personnel from the Central crime branch working in coordination with the city intelligence unit, to monitor and tackle extremist activity in the city, is housed on the fifth floor. The sixth floor houses the intelligence wing of the city police. The seventh floor houses the traffic police control room and another control room with children, women and senior citizen's helpline. The topmost floor is occupied by the commissioner and the four additional commissioners and joint commissioner (intelligence), alongside a large conference hall.

== See also ==
- Police headquarters building
- Architecture of Chennai
