= Police headquarters building, Chennai =

Coordinates: 13.042342°N 80.278881°E

Tamil Nadu Police headquarters building
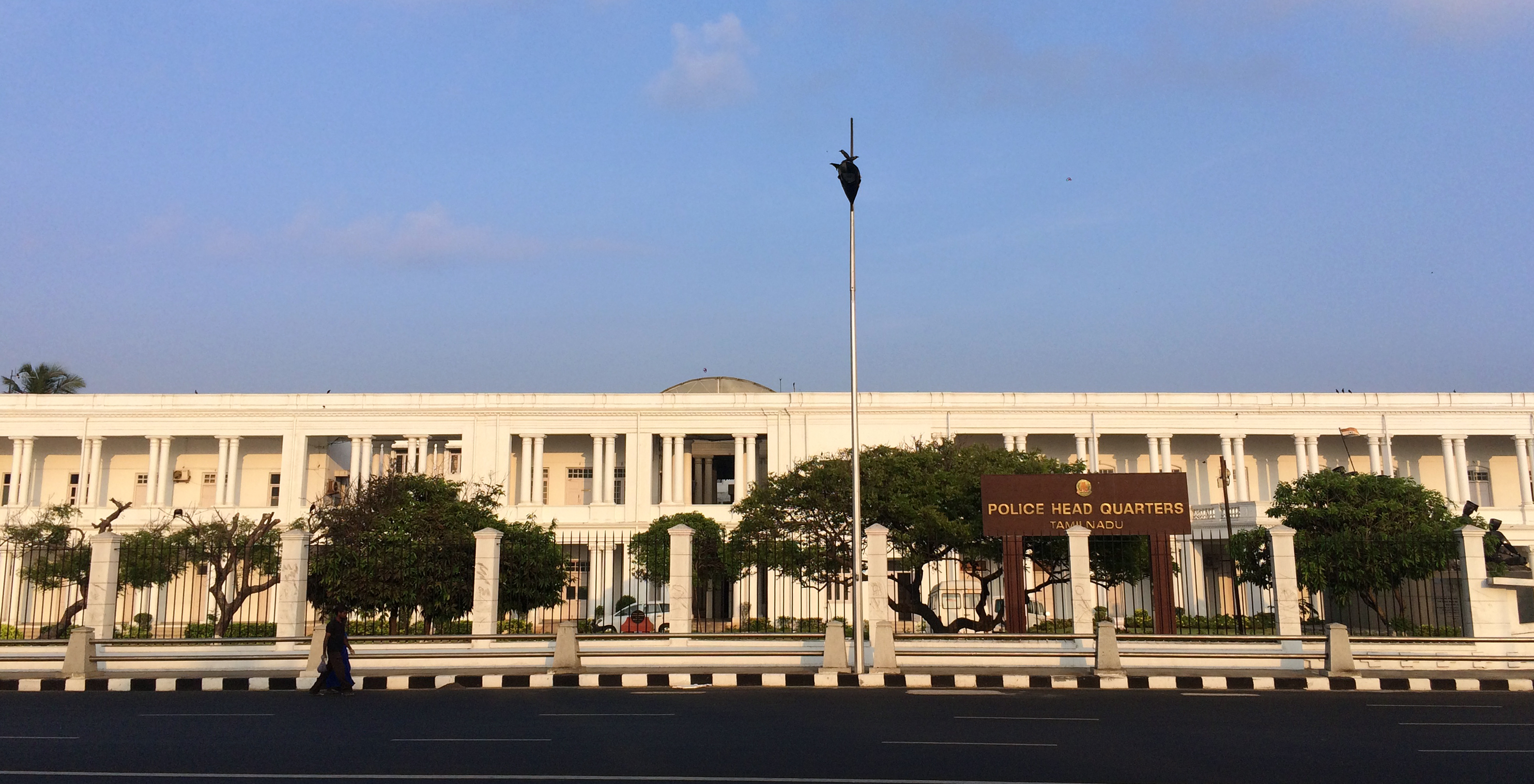
- Tamil Nadu Police Headquarters
- Interactive map of the Tamil Nadu Police headquarters building area

General information
- Type: Administrative building
- Location: Kamaraj Salai, Mylapore, Chennai
- Completed: 1839
- Owner: Tamil Nadu Police

Technical details
- Floor count: 2

The Police headquarters building hosts the headquarters of the Tamil Nadu Police. It is located on Kamarajar Salai along the promenade of the Marina Beach. It is spread over an area of 11.7 acres (4.7 ha). The building is classified as a heritage structure.

The building was built in 1839 originally as a Free Masons lodge, and was taken on lease by the Madras Police in 1865 for a rent of ₹90 (equivalent to ₹45,000 or US$530 in 2023) per month. In 1874, the building was bought by the government for ₹20,000 (equivalent to ₹9.9 million or US$120,000 in 2023) and was expanded at a cost of ₹10,000 (equivalent to ₹4.9 million or US$58,000 in 2023). A new annexure building, consisting of three blocks, spread over a built-up area of 161,000 ft^{2} (15,000 m^{2}), was added in 2012 at a cost of ₹245 million (equivalent to ₹460 million or US$5.5 million in 2023).

== See also ==
- Architecture of Chennai
- Chennai Police Commissionerate
