= Tiruchirappalli Cantonment =

- Neighbourhood
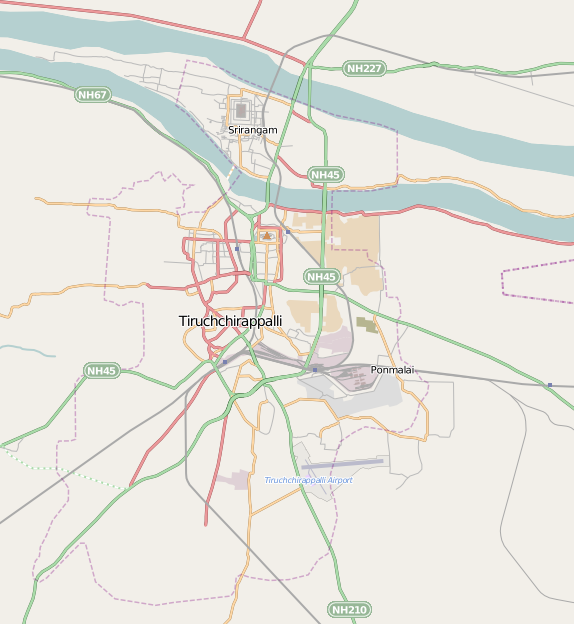
- Location within Tiruchirapalli
- Coordinates: 10°48′0″N 78°40′59″E
- Country: India
- State: Tamil Nadu
- Time zone: UTC+5.30 (IST)

The Tiruchirappalli Cantonment (originally Trichinopoly Cantonment) is a residential neighbourhood in the city of Tiruchirappalli. It originated as a cantonment of the Madras Regiment in the 18th century. Most of the hotels and restaurants and the main tourist office and post office of Tiruchirappalli are located here. The Tiruchirappalli Junction is also located in the cantonment area.

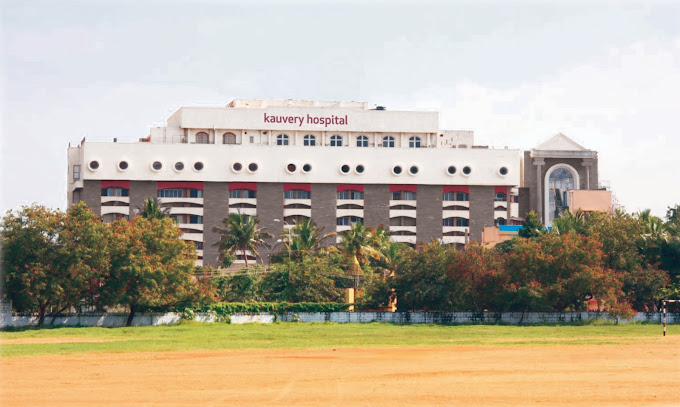
Cauvery Hospital at Tiruchi Cantonment
