= Karnan (2021 film) =

2021 film by Mari Selvaraj

- Theatrical release poster
- Directed by: Mari Selvaraj
- Written by: Mari Selvaraj
- Produced by: Kalaipuli S. Thanu
- Starring: Dhanush; Lal; Rajisha Vijayan; Yogi Babu; Natty Subramaniam
- Cinematography: Theni Eswar
- Edited by: Selva R. K.
- Music by: Santhosh Narayanan
- Production company: V Creations
- Release date: 9 April 2021
- Running time: 168 minutes
- Country: India
- Language: Tamil

Karnan is a 2021 Indian Tamil-language action drama film directed by Mari Selvaraj, and produced by Kalaipuli S. Thanu. The film stars Dhanush, Rajisha Vijayan (in her Tamil debut), Lal, Yogi Babu, Lakshmi Priyaa Chandramouli, Gouri G. Kishan and Natty Subramaniam. It features music composed by Santhosh Narayanan, cinematography by Theni Eswar, and editing by Selva R. K. The film follows the titular character from a lower caste background as he fights for the rights of his people.

The film began production in January 2020 and was completed that December, after delays in between due to the COVID-19 pandemic. It was theatrically released on 9 April 2021. Though the film generated controversies for allegedly being influenced by the 1995 Kodiyankulam caste violence, it received critical acclaim and was a box office success, becoming as one of the highest grossing Tamil films of 2021, despite its theatrical run being affected due to pandemic restrictions. The Indian Express called Karnan one of the best Tamil films of 2021.

== Plot ==
In southern Tamil Nadu during the late 1990s, the neighbouring villages of Melur and Podiyankulam remain in a state of ongoing conflict. The dominant-caste residents of Melur leverage their political influence to deny Podiyankulam a bus stop, forcing the oppressed-caste residents of Podiyankulam to commute via Melur. Karnan, a hot-headed youth from Podiyankulam, wins a local ritualistic sword competition. His elderly confidant, Yaema Raja, worries that Karnan's volatile temper will jeopardise his selection into the CRPF.

Vadamalaiyan, a village head, seeks to take Karnan's elder sister Padmini as a second wife. Meanwhile, Karnan is in love with Vadamalaiyan's sister, Draupadhi. When Karnan gets into an altercation with Vadamalaiyan over his proposal to Padmini, Draupadhi misunderstands the conflict and breaks off her romantic relationship with Karnan. Concurrently, Karnan continues to grieve the death of his younger sister, who died of a seizure on the road when none came forward to admit her into an hospital.

Karnan, Yaema Raja and the former's friends vandalise a bus after its driver refuses to stop for a pregnant woman. Although the bus owner and village elders reach an amicable settlement, the caste-prejudiced Superintendent of police, Kannabiran, views the defiance as an affront to authority. To assert dominance, Kannabiran summons the village elders under the pretext of giving statements, brutally tortures them overnight for defying caste norms, and detains them on bogus charges. The next morning, Karnan uncovers the abuse, raids the police station with his friends, rescues the injured elders, and retreats to Podiyankulam. The villagers susbsequently barricade Podiyankulam against retribution.

As the village prepares for a police siege, Draupadhi and Vadamalaiyan resolve their misunderstandings with Karnan. Shortly after, Karnan receives his official CRPF appointment letter. Though reluctant to leave his community and Draupadhi vulnerable, he is persuaded by Yaema Raja and the villagers to depart for his training. Moments after his departure, Kannabiran leads a violent police raid on the defenceless village. To rally his people, Yaema Raja sacrifices himself through self-immolation.

After a young boy runs to alert Karnan about the assault, Karnan returns with his ritual sword and traps Kannabiran in a hut, demanding the presence of high-ranking government officials to resolve the conflict. When a fight breaks out inside, Kannabiran proudly cites his caste superiority and threatens the total destruction of Podiyankulam. Enraged, Karnan slays Kannabiran and surrenders to the authorities.

A decade later, Karnan is released from prison and returns home. Podiyankulam has finally secured its long-denied bus stop, the village elders have succumbed to the effects of police brutality, the younger generation has achieved formal education, and a large mural honouring Yaema Raja adorns the community hall wall. Reunited with Draupadhi, his sister Padmini who is happily married, and the others, Karnan is welcomed back with open celebrations.

== Cast ==
- Dhanush as Karnan
- Rajisha Vijayan as Draupathi (Voice dubbed by Nikhila Vimal)
- Lal as Yema Raja (Thatha)
- Yogi Babu as Vadamalaiyaan, Draupathi's brother
- Gouri G. Kishan as Poyilaal
- Jagan as Murugavel
- Lakshmi Priyaa Chandramouli as Padmini, Karnan's sister
- Natty Subramaniam as SP Kannabiran IPS
- G. M. Kumar as Duriyodhanan, Podiyankulam Village Head
- Delhi Ganesh as Anbuchezhiyan
- Shanmugarajan as Abhimanyu
- Singampuli as Deva
- 'Poo' Ram as Karnan's Father
- Janaki as Karnan's Mother
- Azhagam Perumal as Melur Village Head
- Mathan Kumar as Ragupathi

== Production ==
=== Development ===
In November 2018, Dhanush announced his upcoming project will be directed by Mari Selvaraj, who previously directed Pariyerum Perumal (2018). Kalaipuli S. Thanu produced the film under V Creations, his second consecutive film with Dhanush, after Vetrimaaran's Asuran (2019). Despite its announcement in November 2018, the project's launch was delayed. In August 2019, reports stated that the film was tentatively titled as Karnan, although no official confirmation came from the team.

In September 2019, sources claimed that the film may begin production in December 2019, once Dhanush completes shooting for the Karthik Subbaraj-directorial titled Jagame Thandhiram. (Note: The film was tentatively titled as D40 (Dhanush's 40th film as a lead actor), before the film's official title Jagame Thandhiram was announced in February 2020.) In September, Dhanush met Mari in London to finalise the script for the film. After Dhanush was impressed by the narration of the final script, the makers kick-started the pre-production works on 29 September, with Santhosh Narayanan being announced as the composer. On 6 January 2020, the makers officially announced the film's title as Karnan. The film is loosely based on the 1995 Kodiyankulam violence.

=== Casting ===
In September 2019, Malayalam actress Rajisha Vijayan signed the female lead opposite Dhanush, thus making her debut in Tamil. The following month, veteran Malayalam actor Lal was also brought on board for the project. In December 2019, Natty Subramaniam also confirmed his part in the film. Tamil comedian and actor Yogi Babu, who appeared in Selavraj's debut film Pariyerum Perumal was roped in for the film's cast, which marked his maiden collaboration with Dhanush. During the pooja ceremony of the film, Babu and Vijayan were present in the film's cast, which confirmed their inclusion in the project. In January 2020, a still from the sets featuring Dhanush and Lal, was released with Dhanush essaying the titular character Karnan, whereas the latter's character was revealed as Yemen. Lakshmi Priyaa Chandramouli and Gouri G. Kishan were roped in as supporting cast.

=== Filming ===
After wrapping the shoot for Karthik Subbaraj's Jagame Thandhiram, Dhanush joined the film's sets in Tirunelveli on 3 January. A launch ceremony for the film was held in a simple manner on 6 January 2020, and principal photography commenced the same day. Mari Selvaraj and art director T. Ramalingam recreated a replica miniature model of a village in the district.

With the shooting being progressed in a brisk pace, Dhaunsh unveiled a still from the film through social media platforms on 28 January. The picture features a silhouette of Dhanush holding a sword in his hand. The still went viral upon release with unique poster designs, with the still making rounds on the internet. On 24 February 2020, Dhanush posted a picture from the sets during the completion of the film's second schedule. The makers completed 90% of the film's portions, before being halted due to the COVID-19 pandemic induced lockdown in India in March 2020. Nine months later, on 25 November 2020, the team resumed film shooting in order to complete few patchwork scenes and was wrapped up on 9 December 2020.

== Themes ==
In a 2020 Ananda Vikatan interview, Mari Selvaraj refuted the connections of the Podiyankulam violence with the script. He further added that "This is a work of fiction. It will have some elements of truth. But there is no need for film directors to portray truth. There are newspapers and magazines to inform the masses about the truth. We are reading and listening to a lot of stories. We take inspiration from those stories to create a film."

Mari Selvaraj in an interview with a news portal, stated the reason for the film's title as well as Dhanush's character in the film. He explained that "While the Karnan from Mahabharata was the one who gave away all his worldly belongings, Dhanush's Karnan has nothing to offer in the film as he comes from a conservative background. Karnan will also be seen fighting for his rights in the movie."

Jaya Gomathi Mirra, editor and chief film critic working for Cinema Express, reviewing for Karnan stated about the parallel themes involved with Mahabharata and its similarity with the plot and characters, as also film critic Baradwaj Rangan. Along with this, Mirra also reviewed the similarities and the connections with Selvaraj's previous film Pariyerum Perumal; she also reviewed about the political and artistic resonances in world cinema, quoting the likes of Seven Samurai, Bacurau and Les Misérables which also had similarities with the film.

== Music ==
The film's soundtrack is composed by Santhosh Narayanan, in his second collaboration with Mari Selvaraj after Pariyerum Perumal, and fourth collaboration with Dhanush after Kodi, Vada Chennai and Jagame Thandhiram. In November 2019, Santhosh started the music production of the film with some folk artists across Tamil Nadu. The music album which was marketed by Think Music, features seven tracks in total, which includes four songs and three instrumentals; while three of the songs: "Kandaa Vara Sollunga", "Manjanathi Puranam" and "Thattaan Thattaan" were released as singles on 17, 25 February and 3 March 2021, the fourth single "Uttradheenga Yeppov" was released on 7 March, and the audio launch was held on 31 March. The complete album was released via music streaming platforms on 8 April.

== Release ==
=== Theatrical ===
The makers announced the film's theatrical release on 9 April 2021, with its first look poster which unveiled in February 2021. Aashirvad Cinemas acquired the distribution rights of the film in Kerala. The satellite rights were sold to Zee Tamil in late July 2020. LetsOTT, a digital media company announced that the film's post theatrical streaming rights were acquired by Amazon Prime Video, further adding that the film will be made available through the platform post 30-days of its theatrical run. The film's Tamil Nadu theatrical rights were sold for ₹25 crore.

A day before the scheduled release on 8 April 2021, The Government of Tamil Nadu imposed 50% seating capacity in theatres due to surge in COVID-19 cases in Tamil Nadu. Producer Kalaipuli S. Thanu tweeted that the film will be released on the scheduled date despite new restrictions on theatre occupancy being imposed. Advanced bookings of the film started on 6 April 2021, post Tamil Nadu Legislative Assembly elections.

=== Home media ===
The film began streaming on Amazon Prime Video from 14 May 2021. It premiered on Zee Tamil at 6:00 PM on 15 August 2021, the occasion of Independence Day.

== Reception ==
=== Box office ===
Karnan registered ₹10.40 crore at the box office, which marked Dhanush's highest opening in his career. Despite 50% occupancy limit, the film earned ₹25.60 crore during the opening weekend, due to the positive word-of-mouth. The film received good response from audience at the rural centres, which helped a raise through its collections. The collections of the film were much affected by the new restrictions for theatres in order to curb COVID-19; as of the first eleven days of its release, it collected ₹46 crore from Tamil Nadu alone. It concluded its theatrical run with worldwide gross estimated to be ₹67.25 crore.

=== Critical response ===
Srivatsan S. of The Hindu praised the film for its powerful portrayal of resistance of the oppressed, saying "In Pariyerum Perumal, the message was: “Until you change, nothing is going to change." But with Karnan, the message seems to be even more clear: "It doesn't matter if you change, we won't."" Bharaty Singaravel of The News Minute wrote "With the release of his much-anticipated second film, Karnan, [Selvaraj] establishes a formidable space for himself amongst the young, progressive voices of current Tamil cinema" and gave four-and-a-half out of five stars for the film. Baradwaj Rangan wrote for Film Companion, "Like Pariyerum Perumal was carried by Kathir, Karnan is carried by Dhanush. This is a fantastic performance which is not very surprising but what surprises you is how many variations he brings in".

Saibal Chatterjee of NDTV praised the film for its hard-hitting treatment of caste exploitation, writing: "The canvas is wider, the treatment of the theme of rebellion against exploitation is more elaborate, and the socio-political commentary is invested with greater buoyancy." M. Suganth of The Times of India gave four out of five stars from the film stating "Karnan might seem like a familiar tale of struggle between the oppressed and oppressor, but Mari Selvaraj's detailing makes the film feel both unique and universal at the same time". Sudhir Srinivasan of Cinema Express gave four out of five stating "A deeply affecting, artistically fulfilling film, Mari Selvaraj's second film confirms that we can expect great things from this director".

Manoj Kumar R of The Indian Express gave five out of five stars for the film and wrote "This film needs to be experienced emotionally and visually. It is an approximation of generations of sufferings of people, who have been subjected to unspeakable atrocities owing to where they belong in the caste hierarchy." Ranjani Krishnakumar in her review for Firstpost explained the film's biggest success which lies in the writing, and also stated that "In spite of bringing together dozens of characters, Selvaraj makes each one of them real". She gave four-and-a-half out of five stars for the film.

A critic from Sify gave five out of five stars saying "Karnan is a classic revenge saga that talks about the pain, suffering, and rise of the oppressed." In his review for Hindustan Times, Haricharan Pudipeddi praised the film stating it as "one of the most powerful films of Tamil cinema in recent years".

== Controversies ==
=== Title issue ===
With the film's title announced on 6 January, it received criticism from fans of Sivaji Ganesan, as Ganesan starred in the 1964 film of the same name, as the Mahabharata character Karnan. R. Chandrashekharan, president of the Sivaji Social Welfare Association, wrote a letter to producer Thanu requesting a change in the film's title. In the letter, Chandrashekharan stated "Karnan refers to a giver, a benevolent giver. But it's said that your film is on someone who fights for rights. It's an acceptable title if you're recreating the story of Mahabharata. But for a social film, it's not right to use the title Karnan and for you to act in it". He added that doing so would not only hurt Ganesan's fans but also those of the Mahabharata.

=== Protests from Tamil Nadu Mukkulathor Pulipadai ===
On 21 February, actor and politician Karunas from the Tamil Nadu Mukkulathor Pulipadai, demanded ban on the film since it was reported to be based on the 1995 Kodiyankulam caste riots. The party issued a press release saying that the film is against a particular caste and that these movies will affect the peace in the society, and also mentioned a scene where Dhanush's character attacks a police station and that it degrades police. He further demanded that the film's director Mari Selvaraj be arrested for instigating caste-based riots. In response to the issue, Selvaraj stated in an online interaction with the film is not based on the Kodiyankulam caste riots.

=== Historical accuracy ===
Udhayanidhi Stalin (Youth Wing leader of Dravida Munnetra Kazhagam), who praised the film and its makers, also pointed out the alleged discrepancy in the timeline of the riots. In his tweet about the film, he stated that the Kodiyankulam violence happened 1995, but the year shown in the film was 1997, which had irked some of the party' sympathisers and members, as DMK was in power in 1997. He shared the factual error with director Mari Selvaraj and producer Thanu, with both being agreed to rectify the inaccuracies. Mari Selvaraj explained the film's setting in 1997 to provide a reference to how people lived during the time. Later on, the makers changed the period to just the "later part of the 90s". But with DMK's disapproval in the changes, the team later released a card which had a quote stating "The times when the common man began to fight for the basic needs and human rights", in place of the incident's date shown in the film.
