= Two tumbler system =

Practice of caste discrimination in India

Two tumbler system, also known as the double tumbler system, is a discriminatory social practice rooted in caste hierarchy, in which Dalits are denied the use of the same tumbler as members of "higher" castes. Tea shops keep separate tumblers for Dalits. The practice has been reported in some rural areas of Tamil Nadu, Karnataka and Andhra Pradesh.

== Practice ==
Tea store owners maintain separate cups for Dalits and members of caste. To drink the tea they purchased, Dalits are required to sit in separate spaces inside the shop or outside. It's observed that specifically for Dalits, the owner of the tea shop will pour tea into the cup held out by a Dalit. Disposable cups are given to the Dalits in other cases. The tumblers given to Dalits are of poorer quality than the ones used by members of caste. Dalits are frequently made to clean their tumblers and pay without touching the cashier. In some villages in Tamil Nadu, three tumblers were present, one for Arunthathiyar, one for the non-Arunthathiyar Dalit and one for members of caste.

In some villages, outsiders visiting the village also face the same discrimination. If someone is a kin of a member of caste, he will be served tea in a glass tumbler or a stainless steel tumbler. If a person has come to see a Dalit, the person will be served tea in a plastic tumbler.

To avoid detection by monitoring agencies, the practice has evolved into more sophisticated forms. Dalits were originally given tea in coconut shells blaming pollution, then came the use of steel tumblers for others and glass tumblers for Dalits which the Dalits had to wash themselves. Dalits were then offered tea in different glass tumblers with different coloured paint markings on the bottom of tumblers designated for Dalits. Then, Dalits were asked to bring in their own glasses. Presently, plastic cups are used for the Dalits. In most situations, Dalits are unable to rest on seats in tea shops and must sit or squat on the floor.

In April 2011, a Supreme Court of India bench described the two-tumbler system as a "highly objectionable" criminal offence under the Scheduled Caste and Scheduled Tribe (Prevention of Atrocities) Act, 1989.

== Prevalence ==
It is practiced in many tea stalls in rural parts of Tamil Nadu and owned by non-Dalits. The system is also prevalent in Andhra Pradesh and Karnataka.

According to Evidence, a non-governmental organization, the system was in place at 463 teashops in Madurai, with Dalits and Scheduled Tribes being served tea in plastic cups whereas members of caste were provided tea in glass or steel cups. Oppressed populations in some villages were forced to stand and drink tea in several places since seats and benches were only given for high caste members. The practice was more prevalent in Usilampatti taluk, followed by Vadipatti taluk and Thirumangalam taluk. Before coming to the teashop, Dalits in certain villages are required to keep their footwear at their homes or at a safe distance from the shops. The system was practiced in 104 of the total villages studied, reflecting a 49% prevalence. The practice was documented in 13 out of 21 villages in Salem, 7 out of 13 villages in Madurai, 14 out of 24 villages in Dindigul, 11 out of 17 villages in Thanjavur, 14 out of 22 villages in Coimbatore and 13 out of 17 villages in Virudhunagar.

People's Watch, a human rights NGO in its report published in October 2008 said that the two tumbler system is practiced in many villages in Tirunelveli district.

A study by the organisation Swabhimani Dalit Shakti in Karnataka revealed the system to be prevalent in 57 villages out of the 87 villages studied.

== Bibliography ==
- Anandhi, S.; Kapadia, Karin (2017-05-18). Dalit Women: Vanguard of an Alternative Politics in India. Taylor & Francis. ISBN 978-1-351-79719-1.
- Armstrong, Elisabeth (2013-11-07). Gender and Neoliberalism: The All India Democratic Women's Association and Globalization Politics. Routledge. ISBN 978-1-317-91142-5.
- Gurusamy, S. (2019-06-05). Empowerment of Marginalized: Challenges and Solutions. MJP Publisher.
- Gurusamy, S. (2019-06-11). Dalit Empowerment in India. MJP Publisher.
- Rajan, V. G. Julie; Dwivedi, Om Prakash (2016-02-26). Human Rights in Postcolonial India. Routledge. ISBN 978-1-317-31011-2.
