= Shastri Nagar, Great Nicobar =

Sastri Nagar Shastri Nagar
- village
- Country: India
- State: Andaman and Nicobar Islands
- District: Nicobar
- Tehsil: Great Nicobar

Population (2011)
  - Total: 15
- Time zone: UTC+5:30 (IST)
- 2011 census code: 645191

Sastri Nagar is a village in the Nicobar district of Andaman and Nicobar Islands, India. It is located in the Great Nicobar tehsil, around 35 km from Campbell Bay.

The village comes under the administration of Laxmi Nagar panchayat.

== Demographics ==
According to the 2011 census of India, Sastri Nagar has 6 households. The effective literacy rate (i.e. the literacy rate of population excluding children aged 6 and below) is 92.86%.

Demographics (2011 Census)
	Total	Male	Female
Population	15	9	6
Children aged below 6 years	1	1	0
Scheduled caste	0	0	0
Scheduled tribe	0	0	0
Literates	13	7	6
Workers (all)	10	7	3
Main workers (total)	6	6	0
Main workers: Cultivators	4	4	0
Main workers: Agricultural labourers	2	2	0
Main workers: Household industry workers	0	0	0
Main workers: Other	0	0	0
Marginal workers (total)	4	1	3
Marginal workers: Cultivators	4	1	3
Marginal workers: Agricultural labourers	0	0	0
Marginal workers: Household industry workers	0	0	0
Marginal workers: Others	0	0	0
Non-workers	5	2	3
