= Kumaran Nagar =

Kumaran Nagar குமரன் நகர்
- Neighbourhood
- Location within Chennai Location within Tamil Nadu Location within India
- Coordinates: 13.126271°N 80.227765°E
- Country: India
- State: Tamil Nadu
- District: Chennai
- Metro: Chennai
- Elevation: 5 m (16 ft)

Languages
  - Official: Tamil
- Time zone: UTC+5:30 (IST)
- PIN: 600082
- Telephone code: 044
- Planning agency: CMDA
- City: Chennai
- Lok Sabha constituency: North Chennai
- Vidhan Sabha constituency: Kolathur
- Civic agency: Chennai Corporation

Kumaran Nagar (Tamil: குமரன் நகர்), is a developed residential area in North Chennai, a metropolitan city in Tamil Nadu, India.

== Location ==
Kumaran Nagar is located near Kolathur, Peravallur and Perambur.
