= Pudhuvannarapettai =

Seashore area in Tamil Nadu, India

Coordinates: 13.083889°N 80.27°E

New Washermenpet (known in Tamil as "புது வண்ணாரபேட்டை") is a seashore area located in the northern part of Chennai, Tamil Nadu, India. It is mainly an industrial area where many large corporations are located, such as Eveready Batteries, Savorit, Metal Box and many heavy metal industries. It comes under the Chennai Corporation Tondiapet Zone.
