= 1995 Kodiyankulam violence =

Caste violence in Tamil Nadu, India

The 1995 Kodiyankulam violence occurred on August 31, 1995 when a force of 600 policemen attacked the all-Dalit village of Kodiyankulam in Thoothukudi district, Tamil Nadu, India and destroyed property and took away cash and jewellery worth several lakhs of rupees. The police raid was on the instruction of the dominant caste officials. The raid was reportedly held to destroy the material prosperity of the Dalits.

== Background ==
Kodiyankulam is a village located in the Thoothukudi district, with a majority of 287 households belonging to the dalit Pallar caste. Human Rights Watch reported that the Dalits of the village have benefited from the influx of financial resources from family members working in Kuwait, Dubai and the United States, since 1980. The Parakirama Pandian Tank, built under British rule in the 1940s and subsequently renovated and restored by the Indian National Congress government in the 1960s, helped agriculture flourish and made Kodiyankulam prosper. The literacy rate in many Pallar villages in the region was better than the state and district average. Women were also educated in the village, with a large number of female graduates and postgraduates which made them assertive. The village gave leadership to the other Pallar villages in the area due to its comparatively higher wealth and higher level of education and awareness.

Discrimination also prevailed against the Dalits in the region, they were prevented entry in many temples and wells in the village, Dalits were served separate glasses in tea shops, they were not allowed to travel in Maravar dominated streets and were made to sit on the floor during village council meetings. When the Dalits became assertive they started to resist the discrimination.

== Causes ==
On July 26, 1995, a quarrel started between a Dalit bus driver and some school students who belonged to the Maravar caste, the bus driver was beaten up by Maravars. The incident led to Dalits attacking the village of Veerasigamani which was dominated by the Maravars and damaged a statue of U. Muthuramalingam Thevar, a freedom fighter, public speaker and politician . The Maravars put provocative posters abusing Pallars in government buses and all over the region. Posters urging Thevars to murder Pallars and kidnap their women were also put up. The policemen were not only spectators but on some occasions they also took part in the attacks against the Pallars. This led to violence against Dalits and their properties which lasted for a week. The violence left at least 18 people from both sides dead and crores of property damage apart from numerous government buses burnt or destroyed.

== Police attack ==
In the presence of the district magistrate and the superintendent of police, 600 policemen raided Kodiyankulam at the instruction of Thevar officials on August 31, 1995, destroying properties. Televisions, tape recorders, fans, sewing, motorcycles, machines, tractors, farm equipment and food grain storages. They burnt the passports of educated Dalit youth in bonfire along with clothes. The only well present in the village was reportedly poisoned by police. They harassed the women and assaulted the elders. The attack began at 10:45 am and continued until 3:15 pm. Cash and jewellery worth several lakhs of rupees were also taken by the policemen. The police raid was reported to target the material prosperity of the Pallars.

== Investigations ==
The raid in Kodiyankulam was reportedly intended to apprehend suspects in a murder investigation and recover explosives and deadly weapons suspected to be in the hands of Dalits. Observers said that the police accused the residents of this prosperous all-Dalit village of providing material and moral help to criminals in the region. According to observers, the police raid's objective was to destroy the village's economic base.

=== People's Union for Civil Liberties ===
The People's Union for Civil Liberties's (PUCL) advocates made a visit to the Thoothukudi district. They said that the police assaulted the villagers with aruvals, iron rods, hammers and axes, causing property damage. The police used metal detectors to find gold jewellery, which they stole along with cash and valuables. The Thoothukudi district PUCL demanded that the President of India order a Central Bureau of Investigation (CBI) probe into the incident and take action against the District magistrate, who they said was responsible for the violence.

=== Gomathinayagam Commission ===
The Tamil Nadu government ordered the payment of around ₹ 17 lakh in assistance to the affected people of the incident. The government named P. Gomathinayagam, a former district judge as a one-member commission of investigation. Gomathinayagam paid a visit to the riot-affected areas. He investigated only one house in Kodiyankulam and then immediately left when the people told him that they were boycotting the Commission.

On March 12, 1996, the Commission delivered its report to the government. Since the Devendra Kula Vellalar Federation petitioned the High Court for a CBI investigation, Dalits from Kodiyankulam and other villages decided to boycott the commission. The Commission heard from 26 government witnesses, mostly police officers, including the Superintendent of Police, as well as 133 people. Since Dalits boycotted the Commission, the Thevars provided the majority of the public witnesses.

On the Kodiyankulam incident, the Commission claimed that there was no police excess. The Puthiya Tamilagam, Dravidar Kazhagam, Viduthalai Chiruthaigal Katchi and the Communist Parties opposed to the inquiry of the commission.

== Aftermath ==
The incident created widespread outrage, and villagers publicly protested against the ruling All India Anna Dravida Munnetra Kazhagam (AIADMK). They were successful in electing K. Krishnaswamy, president of the Federation of Devendrakula Vellalar Sangam, to the state legislative assembly.

== In popular media ==
The storyline of the movie Karnan (2021 film) is loosely influenced by this incident.

== Bibliography ==
- Human Rights Watch (1999). Broken People: Caste Violence Against India's "untouchables". Human Rights Watch. ISBN 978-1-56432-228-9.
- Pandian, M. (January 2000). "Dalit Assertion in Tamil Nadu: An Exploratory Note". Journal of Indian School of Political Economy. 12.(Available online)
- Manikumar, K.A. (2017-12-01). "Caste Clashes (1995) and Judge Gomathinayagam Inquiry Commission: A Study". Review of Development and Change. 22 (2): 62–87. doi:10.1177/0972266120170204. ISSN 0972-2661. S2CID 200037510.
- Manikumar, K A (6 Sep 1997). "Caste Clashes in South Tamil Nadu". Economic and Political Weekly. 32 (36): 7–8.
