= Department of Home, Prohibition and Excise =

Government department of Tamil Nadu state, India

Department of Home, Prohibition and Excise (Tamil Nadu)

Agency overview
- Formed: 1811
- Jurisdiction: Tamil Nadu
- Headquarters: Chennai
- Ministers responsible: C. Joseph Vijay, Chief Minister and Minister for Home Department; K. Vignesh, Minister for Prohibition and Excise Department; C. T. R. Nirmal Kumar, Minister for Prisons, Courts, and Prevention of Corruption
- Agency executive: P Amudha, IAS, Home Secretary (Additional Chief Secretary, Home, Prohibition & Excise)
- Child agencies: Tamil Nadu Police; Tamil Nadu Fire and Rescue Services; Tamil Nadu Prisons Department; Commissionarate of Prohibition and Excise, Tamil Nadu; Narcotics Intelligence Bureau (Tamil Nadu)
- Website: tncpe.gov.in

The Department of Home, Prohibition and Excise is one of the departments of Government of Tamil Nadu. The Chief Minister of Tamil Nadu generally holds the Home portfolio and is the minister in charge of the Home Department, while the Excise and Prohibition portfolio is generally assigned to a senior Cabinet Minister.

== Sub-divisions ==
The following departments and wings function under the administrative control of the department.

Home

- Police
- Fire and Rescue Services
- Forensic Sciences
- Prisons and Correctional Services
- Transport
- Courts
- Cinemas
- Citizenship
- Prosecution

Prohibition and Excise

- The Commissionerate of Prohibition and Excise
- The Prohibition Enforcement Wing
- Tamil Nadu State Marketing Corporation (TASMAC)
- The Narcotics Intelligence Bureau (NIB)

== Ministers ==
Home

- C. Joseph Vijay (2026-Present)
- M. K. Stalin (2021–26)
- Edapadi k Palaiswamy (2017-21)
- O. Panneerselvam (2016–17)
- J. Jayalalithaa (2011–16)
- M. Karunanidhi (2006–11)

Prohibition and Excise

- K. Vignesh (2026-Present)
- S. Muthusamy (2025-2026)
- V. Senthil Balaji (2024-2025)
- S. Muthusamy (2023–24)
- V. Senthil Balaji (2022–23)
- P. Thangamani (2016–21)
- R. Viswanathan (2011–16)

== Home Secretaries ==
1947 - 2026:

- O. Pulla Reddi, ICS - Home Secretary
- T.N.S. Raghavan, ICS - Home Secretary
- R. A. Gopalaswami, ICS - Home Secretary
- J. M. Lobo Prabhu, ICS - Home Secretary
- E. U. Damodaran, IAS - Home Secretary
- S. K. Chettur, ICS - Home Secretary
- P. P. I. Vaidyanathan, ICS - Home Secretary
- R. F. Isar, ICS - Home Secretary
- J. Sivanandam, IAS - Home Secretary
- A. Venkatesan, IAS - Home Secretary
- H. K. Ghazi, IAS - Home Secretary
- S. P. Ambrose, IAS - Home Secretary
- H. K. Ghazi, IAS - Home Secretary
- K. Subrahmanyam, IAS - Home Secretary
- C. V. R. Panikar, IAS - Home Secretary
- H. M. Singh, IAS - Home Secretary
- K. Chockalingam, IAS - Home Secretary
- T. V. Venkataraman, IAS - Home Secretary
- K. A. Nambiar, IAS - Home Secretary
- R. Nagarajan, IAS - Home Secretary
- K.J.M. Shetty, IAS - Home Secretary
- B. Vijayaraghavan, IAS - Home Secretary
- K. Malaisamy, IAS - Home Secretary
- R. Varadarajulu, IAS - Home Secretary
- P. V. Rajaraman, IAS - Home Secretary
- Ashoke Joshi, IAS - Home Secretary
- R. Poornalingam, IAS - Home Secretary
- Santha Sheela Nair, IAS - Home Secretary
- Naresh Gupta, IAS - Home Secretary
- Syed Munir Hoda, IAS - Home Secretary
- Sheela Rani Chunkath, IAS - Home Secretary
- Pavan Raina, IAS - Home Secretary
- S. Malathi, IAS - Home Secretary
- K. Gnanadesikan, IAS - Home Secretary
- Sheela Rani Chunkath, IAS - Home Secretary
- Rameshram Mishra, IAS - Home Secretary
- R. Rajagopal, IAS - Home Secretary
- Niranjan Mardi, IAS - Home Secretary
- Apurva Verma, IAS - Home Secretary
- Niranjan Mardi, IAS - Home Secretary
- S. K. Prabhakar, IAS - Home Secretary
- K. Phanindra Reddy, IAS - Home Secretary
- P. Amudha, IAS - Home Secretary
- Dheeraj Kumar, IAS - Home Secretary
- K. Manivasan, IAS - Home Secretary

== See also ==
- Government of Tamil Nadu
- Tamil Nadu Government's Departments
- Ministry of Home Affairs (India)
