= List of accolades received by Madras =

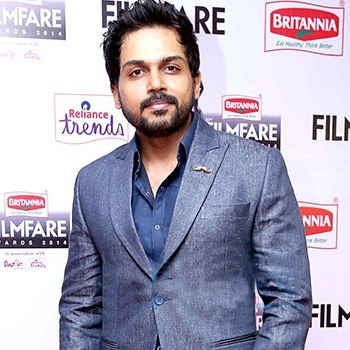
- Karthi's performance in Madras garnered him several awards and nominations
Accolades
Award	Won	Nominated
Ananda Vikatan Cinema Awards	7	7
Edison Awards	4	4
Filmfare Awards South	4	11
Norway Tamil Film Festival Awards	0	1
South Indian International Movie Awards	6	13
Vijay Awards	3	15
- Total number of awards and nominations (Note: Awards in certain categories do not have prior nominations and only winners are announced by the jury. For simplification and to avoid errors, each award in this list has been presumed to have had a prior nomination.)
Totals	24	51
- References

Madras is a 2014 Indian Tamil-language drama film written and directed by Pa. Ranjith. It was produced by K. E. Gnanavel Raja under his production company, Studio Green. The film features Karthi and Catherine Tresa in the lead roles, with Kalaiyarasan, Riythvika and Rama playing supporting roles. The film's story revolves around Kaali (Karthi), an impulsive and short-tempered IT professional who lives in the Vyasarpadi area of Chennai. His friend Anbu (Kalaiyarasan) is killed in the midst of a feud between two factions of a political party over a building wall at one of the housing board apartments in the area. When Kaali hears of this, he decides to avenge Anbu's death. The soundtrack and score were composed by Santhosh Narayanan while the cinematography and editing were handled by Murali G and Praveen K. L. respectively.

Released on 26 September 2014, the film garnered generally positive reviews and was a commercial success at the box office. It was included in The Hindu's top 20 Tamil-language films of the year. The film won 24 awards from 51 nominations; its direction, screenplay, performances of the cast members, music, and cinematography have received the most attention from award groups.

At the 62nd Filmfare Awards South, Madras was nominated in eleven categories, winning Critics Award for Best Actor (Karthi), Best Female Debut (Tresa), Best Supporting Actress (Riythvika) and Best Male Playback Singer (Pradeep Kumar for "Aagayam Theepidicha"). At the 9th Vijay Awards, it received fifteen nominations and won three, Best Supporting Actor, Best Male Playback Singer and a Special Jury Award. Madras received thirteen nominations at the 4th South Indian International Movie Awards ceremony and won six awards, including those for Best Director and Best Male Playback Singer. Karthi and Tresa won the Best Actor Critics and Best Debut Actress awards respectively. Among other wins, the film received seven Ananda Vikatan Cinema Awards and four Edison Awards. It also received a nomination for Best Playback Singer (Female) for Shakthisree Gopalan at the Norway Tamil Film Festival Awards.

== Awards and nominations ==
Award	Date of ceremony (Note: Date is linked to the article about the awards held that year, wherever possible.)	Category	Recipient(s)	Result	Ref.
Ananda Vikatan Cinema Awards	8 January 2015	Best Director	Pa. Ranjith	Won	
Ananda Vikatan Cinema Awards	8 January 2015	Best Story	Pa. Ranjith	Won	
Ananda Vikatan Cinema Awards	8 January 2015	Best Supporting Actor	Kalaiyarasan	Won	
Ananda Vikatan Cinema Awards	8 January 2015	Best Music Director	Santhosh Narayanan (Also for Cuckoo, Jigarthanda)	Won	
Ananda Vikatan Cinema Awards	8 January 2015	Best Playback Singer – Male	Pradeep Kumar for "Aagayam Theepidicha"	Won	
Ananda Vikatan Cinema Awards	8 January 2015	Best Playback Singer – Female	Shakthisree Gopalan for "Naan Nee"	Won	
Ananda Vikatan Cinema Awards	8 January 2015	Best Debut Actress	Catherine Tresa	Won	
Edison Awards	15 February 2015	Best Film	K. E. Gnanavel Raja	Won	
Edison Awards	15 February 2015	Best Director	Pa. Ranjith	Won	
Edison Awards	15 February 2015	Best Supporting Actor	Hari Krishnan	Won	
Edison Awards	15 February 2015	Best Debut Actress	Catherine Tresa	Won	
Filmfare Awards South	26 June 2015	Best Film – Tamil	K. E. Gnanavel Raja	Nominated	
Filmfare Awards South	26 June 2015	Best Director – Tamil	Pa. Ranjith	Nominated	
Filmfare Awards South	26 June 2015	Best Actor – Tamil	Karthi	Nominated	
Filmfare Awards South	26 June 2015	Best Actress – Tamil	Catherine Tresa	Nominated	
Filmfare Awards South	26 June 2015	Best Supporting Actor – Tamil	Kalaiyarasan	Nominated	
Filmfare Awards South	26 June 2015	Best Supporting Actress – Tamil	Riythvika	Won	
Filmfare Awards South	26 June 2015	Best Music Director – Tamil	Santhosh Narayanan	Nominated	
Filmfare Awards South	26 June 2015	Best Male Playback Singer – Tamil	Pradeep Kumar for "Aagayam Theepidicha"	Won	
Filmfare Awards South	26 June 2015	Best Female Playback Singer – Tamil	Shakthisree Gopalan, Dhee for "Naan Nee"	Nominated	
Filmfare Awards South	26 June 2015	Critics Best Actor – Tamil	Karthi	Won	
Filmfare Awards South	26 June 2015	Best Female Debut – South	Catherine Tresa	Won	
Norway Tamil Film Festival Awards	23–26 April 2015	Best Playback Singer (Female)	Shakthisree Gopalan for "Naan Nee"	Nominated	
South Indian International Movie Awards	6–7 August 2015	Best Film – Tamil	K. E. Gnanavel Raja	Nominated	
South Indian International Movie Awards	6–7 August 2015	Best Director – Tamil	Pa. Ranjith	Won	
South Indian International Movie Awards	6–7 August 2015	Best Cinematographer – Tamil	Murali G	Won	
South Indian International Movie Awards	6–7 August 2015	Best Actor – Tamil	Karthi	Nominated	
South Indian International Movie Awards	6–7 August 2015	Best Actor in a Supporting Role – Tamil	Kalaiyarasan	Nominated	
South Indian International Movie Awards	6–7 August 2015	Best Actress in a Supporting Role – Tamil	Riythvika	Nominated	
South Indian International Movie Awards	6–7 August 2015	Best Actor in a Negative Role – Tamil	Poster Nandakumar	Won	
South Indian International Movie Awards	6–7 August 2015	Best Actor (Critics) – Tamil	Karthi	Won	
South Indian International Movie Awards	6–7 August 2015	Best Debut Actress – Tamil	Catherine Tresa	Won	
South Indian International Movie Awards	6–7 August 2015	Best Music Director – Tamil	Santhosh Narayanan	Nominated	
South Indian International Movie Awards	6–7 August 2015	Best Male Playback Singer – Tamil	Pradeep Kumar for "Aagayam Theepidicha"	Won	
South Indian International Movie Awards	6–7 August 2015	Best Female Playback Singer – Tamil	Shakthisree Gopalan for "Naan Nee"	Nominated	
South Indian International Movie Awards	6–7 August 2015	Best Fight Choreographer – Tamil	Anbariv	Nominated	
Vijay Awards	25 April 2015	Best Film	K. E. Gnanavel Raja	Nominated	
Vijay Awards	25 April 2015	Best Director	Pa. Ranjith	Nominated	
Vijay Awards	25 April 2015	Best Actor	Karthi	Nominated	
Vijay Awards	25 April 2015	Best Supporting Actor	Kalaiyarasan	Won	
Vijay Awards	25 April 2015	Best Supporting Actress	Riythvika	Nominated	
Vijay Awards	25 April 2015	Best Villain	Charles Vinoth	Nominated	
Vijay Awards	25 April 2015	Best Debut Actress	Catherine Tresa	Nominated	
Vijay Awards	25 April 2015	Best Cinematographer	Murali G	Nominated	
Vijay Awards	25 April 2015	Best Editor	Praveen K. L.	Nominated	
Vijay Awards	25 April 2015	Best Male Playback Singer	Pradeep Kumar for "Aagayam Theepidicha"	Won	
Vijay Awards	25 April 2015	Best Female Playback Singer	Shakthisree Gopalan for "Naan Nee"	Nominated	
Vijay Awards	25 April 2015	Best Choreographer	Sathish Krishnan for "Kaghidha Kappal"	Nominated	
Vijay Awards	25 April 2015	Best Stunt Director	Anbariv	Nominated	
Vijay Awards	25 April 2015	Special Jury Award	K. E. Gnanavel Raja	Won	
Vijay Awards	25 April 2015	Favourite Song	"Naan Nee"	Nominated	

== See also ==
- List of Tamil films of 2014
