= Kaala (2018 film) =

2018 Indian Tamil-language action drama film

- Theatrical release poster
- Directed by: Pa. Ranjith
- Written by: Pa. Ranjith; Aadhavan Dheetchanya; Makizhnan B. M. (dialogues)
- Produced by: Dhanush; Subaskaran Allirajah
- Starring: Rajinikanth; Nana Patekar; Samuthirakani; Easwari Rao; Huma Qureshi; Pankaj Tripathi
- Cinematography: Murali G.
- Edited by: A. Sreekar Prasad
- Music by: Santhosh Narayanan
- Production companies: Wunderbar Films; Lyca Productions
- Distributed by: Lyca Productions; AA Films (North India)
- Release dates: 6 June 2018 (Malaysia); 7 June 2018 (India)
- Running time: 159 minutes
- Country: India
- Language: Tamil
- Budget: ₹140 crore (Note: The Times of India, Business Today, The Indian Express, The News Minute, DNA India, News 18 and Deccan Chronicle reported that the budget to be ₹140 crore.)
- Box office: ₹159.6 crore (Note: Firstpost estimates the film worldwide gross to be ₹159.56 crore in 22 days.)

Kaala (also marketed as Kaala Karikalan; transl. Black) (Note: The term Kaala is associated with Yama, the Hindu God of death whose iconography depicts him in dark or black colour.) is a 2018 Indian Tamil-language action drama film directed and co-written by Pa. Ranjith and produced by Dhanush and Subaskaran Allirajah under the banners of Wunderbar Films and Lyca Productions. The film stars Rajinikanth in the titular role, alongside Nana Patekar, Eswari Rao, Huma Qureshi (in her Tamil debut), Samuthirakani, Pankaj Tripathi, Anjali Patil, K. Manikandan, Dileepan, Nitish Veera, Sampath Raj and Ravi Kale. The film follows Karikalan "Kaala", the leader of Dharavi, who tries to save his land from getting seized and his people from being evicted by Haridev, a ruthless minister.

The film was officially announced in June 2016 under the tentative title Thalaivar 164, as it is Rajinikanth's 164th film as the lead actor, and the official title was announced in May 2017. Principal photography commenced the same month. It was predominantly shot in Mumbai; however, due to a few difficulties, the team had to shoot at Chennai a few times, and wrapped by mid-October. The film has music composed by Santhosh Narayanan, cinematography handled by Murali G. and editing by A. Sreekar Prasad.

Kaala was scheduled to release on 27 April 2018 in theatres but was postponed due to the conflict between Nadigar Sangam and Digital Service Providers. The film premiered on 6 June 2018 in Malaysia, with the worldwide release on the following day, coinciding the week of Eid al-Fitr, to mixed reviews from critics who praised the cast performances (especially Rajini), action sequences and soundtrack, but the screenwriting and pace received criticism. The film grossed ₹160 crore and was average at the box office. In 2024, Kaala was listed in the British Film Institute's Sight and Sound magazine's '25 Films of the 21st century,' making it the only Indian film to be included.

== Plot ==
In Mumbai, the people who had migrated from southern Tamil Nadu are living as a poor people in the slum of Dharavi. However, a ruthless minister named Haridev "Hari Dada" Abhayankar repeatedly tries to evict the people of Dharavi and seize their land. Over the years, Hari, a former gangster, becomes an MP and later Union Minister. By 2015, Dharavi becomes the central spot of downtown Mumbai. Hari plans to clear the area to construct posh buildings using his construction company in the form of government schemes with the help of his party supporter Vishnu Bhai.

Karikaalan alias "Kaala" is the godfather of the Dharavi residents who oppose Hari's plans as he wants to protect the area and his people. Kaala's ex-love interest, Zareena, returns to her native Dharavi as a representative NGO that hopes to improve the living standards in Dharavi, where she is unaware of Hari's intentions. Despite many attempts by Hari's men, Kaala does not permit evacuation of the slum. Vishnu Bhai's men try to kill Kaala after Kaala visits Zareena. Vishnu Bhai kills the son of a Dharavi resident after the boy throws a stone at a poster of Hari. Kaala eventually kills Vishnu Bhai. The police arrest Kaala after his wedding anniversary party, where he is assaulted at the police station in front of Hari and State Minister and is released the next day. While returning home, Hari makes an assassination attempt on Kaala to take control of the area. However, the attempt goes awry, and Kaala's wife, Selvi, and his second son, Selvam, get killed. Kaala then decides to take revenge on Hari.

Hari threatens the people in Dharavi by creating problems, but Kaala encourages the people to protest against the government to give up the scheme. Kaala and his people campaign through social media, and within two weeks, the State government cancels Hari's "Clean Mumbai Initiative." Humiliated, Hari creates a curfew in Dharavi with the aid of SP Pankaj Patil. Along with some cops and Hari's right-hand man, Inspector Sunil, they raid the area. Kaala and his younger son, Lenin, daughter-in-law, Puyal, and his brother-in-law, Vaaliyappan, fight alongside him against Hari's henchmen and the police. The police believe Kaala is dead after henchmen set his chawl ablaze.

Pankaj gets arrested after a video taken by a reporter named Praveen during the curfew provides evidence that Hari brought the henchmen into Dharavi to create problems with the police's support. They inform the media, but the people of Dharavi deny the news of Kaala's death. Hari again enters Dharavi at a function for constructing a new building, where he begins to hallucinate Kaala's appearance among the crowd and behaves erratically. The people of Dharavi murders Hari in a riot, and the government again cancels the scheme. With Dharavi's success, many slums start to follow Kaala's way of protest to protect their neighbourhood irrespective of their illegal occupation of lands.

== Cast ==
The cast of the film has been listed below:

- Rajinikanth as Karikaalan "Kaala" Vengaiyan, from Tirunelveli, the head of the Tamil people of Dharavi who wants to protect the area and his people.
- Nana Patekar as Haridev Abhayankar alias "Hari Dada", a ruthless minister who killed Kaala's father Vengaiyan.
- Eswari Rao as Selvi Karikaalan, Kaala's wife, who gets killed in a car accident orchestrated by Hari Dada.
- Huma Qureshi as Zareena, Kaala's ex-girlfriend and a slum clearance builder from Africa who returns to Dharavi.
- Samuthirakani as Vaaliyappan, Selvi's brother.
- Anjali Patil as Charumathi (Puyal), Lenin's girlfriend and a member of the 'Vizhithiru' group.
- Manikandan as Lenin, Kaala's youngest son and the founder of the 'Vizhithiru' group, who does not believe in his father's violent methods.
- Dileepan as Selvam, Kaala's second son and a main thug of Kaala, but Hari Dada's men assassinate him.
- Nitish Veera as Kathiravan, Kaala's eldest son, who acts as a strong man for his father's gang.
- Vikram as Kaala's third son
- Aruldoss as Mani, the MLA of Dharavi.
- Aravind Akash as Sivaji Rao Gaekwad, a police constable.
- Sayaji Shinde as Maharashtra Minister
- Sampath Raj as Vishnu Bhai, a local MLA and Hari Dada's silent thug, who is later killed by Kaala
- Ravi Kale as Inspector Sunil, Hari Dada's henchman.
- Pankaj Tripathi as SI Pankaj Patil, a corrupt police official on Hari Dada's payroll.
- Arundhati as Kaala's daughter-in-law.
- Sakshi Agarwal as Kaala's daughter-in-law.
- Suganya as Kaala's daughter-in-law.
- Ramesh Thilak as Praveen, a TV reporter who supports Kaala and was responsible for carrying out Pankaj's arrest.
- Bikramjeet Kanwarpal as Manu Constructions Builder
- Dopeadelicz as a Dharavi resident
- Kanna as Beemji, a Dharavi resident
- "Nakkalites" Chella, a Dharavi resident
- Suryakanth as MLA Candidate
- Vishalini as Devi
- Supergood Subramani
- Shan as Shan
- Ashwanth Thilak as a background dancer in the song "Thanga Sela"

== Production ==
=== Pre-production ===
Following the commercial success of Rajinikanth-starrer Kabali (2016), Rajinikanth was reportedly signed for his next project backed by Dhanush's Wunderbar Films, collaborating with the actor for the first time. Vetrimaaran narrated a script to Dhanush, who set up a meeting for Vetrimaaran to discuss the script with Rajinikanth. The actor liked the script, but later turned down the offer as he felt the script was too political. Later, Rajinikanth approached Pa. Ranjith to work on a script for the former. After the actor and the producer were impressed with Ranjith's script, the latter was hired to helm the project.

=== Development ===
Dhanush announced that he had signed Rajinikanth and Ranjith to work on a new film for his production house, Wunderbar Films during late August 2016. Refuting reports that the film would be a sequel to Kabali, Dhanush announced that production would begin during mid-2017 following the completion of Rajinikanth's work for Shankar's science fiction film 2.0 (2018). In early May 2017, the producers received an open letter from Sundar Shekar Mishra, the foster son of gangster Haji Mastan, threatening that the makers should not depict his father in negative light and if they did, they would face consequences. In reply, Ranjith denied the film was a biopic of Haji Mastan and clarified that the film was based on fictional events, while revealing that Rajinikanth would play a man from Tirunelveli who escapes to Mumbai as a child and goes on to become a powerful don living in Dharavi slums. The title of the film, Kaala was announced in late May 2017, with promotional posters carrying the film's first look released.

=== Casting ===
Following the announcement of the film, Wunderbar Films sought to cast Vidya Balan in a leading role, but the actress turned down the offer. Actress Huma Qureshi was later added to the cast in early May 2017 to feature in a role opposite Rajinikanth. Marathi actress Anjali Patil also announced that she would be playing an important role in the film through a post on her official Twitter account. Several members of the technical crew of Kabali were retained for Kaala, with A. Sreekar Prasad replacing Praveen K. L. as the film's editor during its pre-production stage. Bollywood actor Nana Patekar has been signed to play a politician who is the antagonist. For the role of Kaala's wife, Kasthuri was considered before Easwari Rao was confirmed. Dileepan of Vathikuchi fame is playing as one of the sons of Rajnikanth and Huma Qureshi is playing Zareena, Rajnikanth's ex-girlfriend. It was rumoured that Mammootty was signed in to play the role of Ambedkar in the film, but was proved to be untrue. Dopeadelicz, a rap team from Dharavi, joined the film.

=== Filming ===
Shooting of this film started on 28 May 2017 at Mumbai and the lead actor Rajinikanth participated in this first schedule. It was known that the film was shot at real locations in Mumbai, including Dharavi, CTS and Grant Road. Due to heavy rains in Mumbai, Karthikraja, a student from Dharavi residing in Ganesh Mandir helped a lot in exploring Dharavi in all the fields and also made available all permissions that was a great help to the Production and Direction team from a student. The team had taken a break and erected a set at Chennai with Mumbai as its backdrop.

Anand Mahindra, chairman and managing director of Mahindra Group, was interested in the jeep which was used in the first look poster of this movie. He tweeted that he would love to acquire that jeep for his company's auto museum. The Mumbai schedule of the film, was completed on 29 June 2017. It was also known that the second schedule of the film has been affected due to a strike organised by Film Employees Federation of South India, which has been completed.

=== Dubbing ===
On 27 December 2017, Pa. Ranjith initiated the dubbing process with a formal pooja at Knack Studios in Chennai. Initially scheduled for December 2017, Rajinikanth's dubbing was postponed due to a six-day-long fan meet held from 26 to 31 December. Eventually, Rajinikanth commenced dubbing on 19 January 2018. Patekar delivered his dialogues in Hindi, subsequently dubbed into Tamil. He explained, "Although dubbing is possible, the language isn't native, thus the expressions may not fully convey." Patekar concluded his dubbing on 6 March 2018 in Mumbai.

== Music ==
The soundtrack was composed by Santhosh Narayanan in his second collaboration with actor Rajinikanth after Kabali and his fourth collaboration with director Pa. Ranjith after Attakathi, Madras and Kabali. The soundtrack album consists of nine songs written by Kabilan, Umadevi, Arunraja Kamaraj, Arivu, Dopeadelicz, Logan and Roshan Jamrock. The audio launch event of Kaala took place on 9 May 2018, at YMCA College of Physical Education, Chennai and the songs were simultaneously released on all streaming platforms.

== Release ==
There were many speculations regarding the release date of Kaala, which is known that the film is scheduled to release before 2.0, another Rajinikanth-starrer. In February 2018, the film's producer Dhanush, announced that the film is scheduled to release on 27 April 2018. However, the film's release was postponed due to the standoff between Nadigar Sangam and Digital Service Providers, on the increase of Virtual Print Fee charges, followed by the 2018 Tamil Nadu protests for Kaveri water sharing issue.

The film was released on 7 June 2018, with the Central Board of Film Certification receiving a U/A certificate, with 14 cuts and a runtime of 166 minutes. The film was released in more than 1,800 theatres in India. Kaala was released in more than 700 screens in Tamil Nadu. It recorded lowest advance bookings, a first time for a Rajinikanth starrer. Kaala is the first Indian film ever to be released in Saudi Arabia, following the country lifting its ban on public theatres in December 2017.

== Marketing ==
The film's title poster was launched on 24 May 2017. The first look posters featuring Rajinikanth, were released on 25 May 2017. On 12 December 2017, coinciding with Rajinikanth's 67th birthday, the makers unveiled a new poster from Kaala.

The official Instagram page for Kaala was launched on 28 February 2018. The film's official teaser was supposed to be released on 1 March 2018. But the teaser was delayed, as in order to pay tribute to Jayendra Saraswati Shankaracharya, following his demise, and the teaser was uploaded on YouTube, the same day midnight. The teaser which released in Hindi, Tamil, Malayalam and Telugu, got 14 million views, within its release.

The official merchandise of Kaala was launched by Cover It Up on 4 May 2018. A new Hindi poster, of Kaala was released on 19 May 2018. A contest was announced by the makers, for their fans to dress up like Kaala, and take a picture of it, and post it on twitter using the hashtag #IamKaala, and tagging the, official account of production house, where the lucky winners, would get the official merchandise of the film. The makers released a new Twitter emoji for Kaala, becoming the second South Indian film, to do so, after Mersal (2017). The official trailer was released on 28 May 2018. The makers released a set making video of the Dharavi backdrop in Chennai on 1 June 2018. The film's pre-release event took place at Novotel in Hyderabad on 4 June 2018.

After Kabali (2016), multiple brands join once again with Kaala, which includes Airtel, Cadbury 5 Star, Nippon Paint and Havells. Airtel announced exclusive caller pack, and a new Airtel sim card, imprinted with a still of Rajinikanth from the film. The company had also made essential requirements, to stream the audio launch and trailer, through the Airtel TV app, and also a ticket contest, was held for fans. Nippon Paint launched a new contest called "Shades of Kaala", through their official Facebook page, through which the fans can get couple passes and floppies.

== Controversies ==
K. Rajashekaran of GSR Vinmeen Creations filed a case claiming the title of this film against Pa Ranjith, Rajnikanth and Dhanush. His allegation was that he had registered the title Kaarikalan with the South Indian Film Chamber of Commerce. In response, Wunderbar Films filed a counter-affidavit saying the story was written by Pa Ranjith and the title Kaala is registered by M/s Mini Studio, a sister concern of Wunderbar Films, with Tamil Film Producers Council on 24 May 2017.

The film's release in Karnataka was banned by the Karnataka Film Chamber of Commerce after Rajinikanth made statements supporting Tamil Nadu's claims in the Kaveri River water dispute during the 2018 Tamil Nadu protests for Kaveri water sharing. The film distributor's office in Karnataka was vandalised by pro-Kannada activists as well. It was ultimately released in Karnataka, after an order by the Karnataka High Court.

Kaala later faced calls for banning in Norway and Switzerland after Rajinikanth labelled protestors of the Thoothukudi violence as "anti-social elements".

== Reception ==
=== Critical response ===
The film received mixed reviews from critics. On the review aggregator website Rotten Tomatoes, 57% of 14 critics' reviews are positive, with an average rating of 6/10.

The Times of India rated the film 3.5 out of 5 and stated that Ranjith owes to his excellent technical crew for "helping him visualise and deliver this 51% Rajini-49% Ranjith movie". The Indian Express rated the movie 3.5 out of 5 and said that "Ranjith stays true to his objective. The traces of what we saw in Kabali have been fleshed out and beautifully embellished". NDTV rated the movie 3 out of 5 stars and stated that Kaala is out and out a director's film with a strong political core. Rajinikanth, in a toned-down avatar, is a bonus.'. Meanwhile, The Hindu criticised the movie for its political elements and rated the film 2 out of 5, stating "an underwhelming film made for Rajinikanth, the politician. It’s difficult to think of Kaala as a film that was written for a star who claims to have had no political ambitions at the time. Now that he has become a politician, it’s Rajni the superstar that we long to see". The Hindustan Times gave its ratings as 4 out of 5 for the movie, stating "Rajinikanth lends his voice to Pa Ranjith’s political viewpoint".

=== Box office ===
The film collected ₹112.2 crore (US$12 million) at the worldwide box office in the first weekend. The film collected ₹39.5 crore (US$4.1 million) in the international box office. The film collected ₹4.8 crore (US$500,000) in Telangana, ₹6.2 crore (US$640,000) in Andhra Pradesh, ₹44.8 crore (US$4.7 million) in Tamil Nadu, ₹8.3 crore (US$860,000) in Karnataka, ₹4 crore (US$420,000) in Kerala, ₹4.6 crore (US$480,000) in the Rest of India, ₹72.7 crore (US$7.5 million) in India, ₹11 crore (US$1.1 million) in United States, ₹4.8 crore (US$500,000) in UAE, ₹2.3 crore (US$240,000) in Australia/New Zealand, ₹1.4 crore (US$150,000) in UK and the rest is estimated as ₹20 crore (US$2.1 million).Kaala had a worldwide gross of ₹159.56 crore at the end of its theatrical run. It also collected ₹75.1 crore for its global distributors, who shelled out ₹165 crore on its theatrical rights.

== Awards and nominations ==
Date of ceremony	Award	Category	Recipient(s) and nominee(s)	Result	Ref.
16 December 2018	Behindwoods Gold Medal	Best Supporting Actress	Easwari Rao	Won	
5 January 2019	Ananda Vikatan Cinema Awards	Best Supporting Actress	Easwari Rao	Won	
5 January 2019	Ananda Vikatan Cinema Awards	Best Dialogue	Pa. Ranjith; Makizhnan B. M. Aadhavan Dheetchanya	Won	
5 January 2019	Ananda Vikatan Cinema Awards	Best Music Director	Santhosh Narayanan	Won	
5 January 2019	Ananda Vikatan Cinema Awards	Best Stunt Director	Dhilip Subbarayan	Won	
5 January 2019	Ananda Vikatan Cinema Awards	Best Villain — Male	Nana Patekar	Won	
16 August 2019	8th South Indian International Movie Awards	Best Actress in a Supporting Role	Easwari Rao	Won	
16 August 2019	8th South Indian International Movie Awards	Best Actor in a Supporting Role	Samuthirakani	Nominated	
