= 2018 Indian Premier League =

Cricket tournament

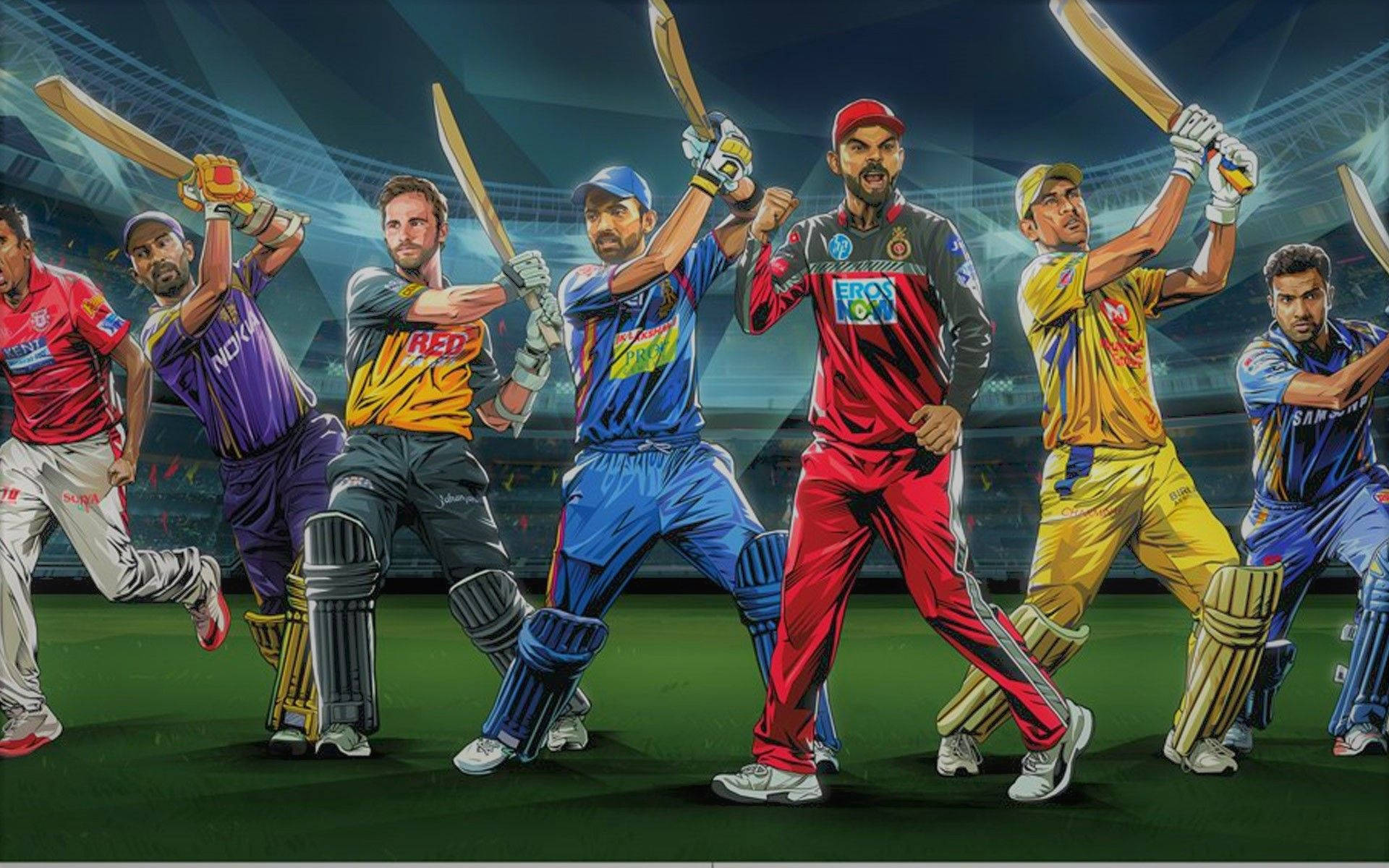
- A poster of the tournament
- Dates: 7 April 2018 – 27 May 2018
- Administrator: Board of Control for Cricket in India
- Cricket format: Twenty20
- Tournament format(s): Double round robin and playoffs
- Champions: Chennai Super Kings (3rd title)
- Runners-up: Sunrisers Hyderabad
- Participants: 8
- Matches: 60
- Most valuable player: Sunil Narine (KKR)
- Most runs: Kane Williamson (SRH) (735)
- Most wickets: Andrew Tye (KXIP) (24)
- Official website: www.iplt20.com

The 2018 Indian Premier League season (also known as IPL 11 and branded as Vivo IPL 2018) was the eleventh season of the Indian Premier League, a professional Twenty20 cricket league established by the BCCI in 2007. The season, which was held from 7 April to 27 May, saw the return of the Chennai Super Kings and the Rajasthan Royals after serving two years of suspension for the involvement of their respective owners in the 2013 IPL betting case. Star Sports purchased the media rights at ₹16,347.5 crore ($2.55 billion) for five years starting from 2018. The tagline was Best vs Best.

Chennai Super Kings won by 8 wickets against Sunrisers Hyderabad in the final to win their third title. Sunrisers Hyderabad captain Kane Williamson won the Orange Cap for the leading run-scorer of the tournament with 735 runs. Andrew Tye, of Kings XI Punjab, was awarded the Purple Cap for finishing as the leading wicket-taker of the tournament with 24 wickets. Sunil Narine of Kolkata Knight Riders was named Most Valuable Player, also known as Man of the Series, while Rishabh Pant of Delhi Daredevils was named the Emerging Player of the Series.

== Background ==
This was the first season of the IPL to use DRS. IPL Fanpark, an initiative where matches are hosted in stadia on a large screen has been planned to be held across 36 cities in 19 states across the India. This season also introduced mid-season transfers. The transfer window will be a short five-day transfer window applicable only for uncapped players who have played not more than two matches at the halfway mark of the tournament.

=== Format ===
Eight teams were scheduled to play in 2018. The tournament involved each team playing every other team twice in a home-and-away, double round-robin format. At the conclusion of the double round-robin league, the top four teams on the basis of aggregate points qualified for the playoffs. In this stage, the top two teams compete with each other (in a match titled "Qualifier 1"), as do the remaining two teams (in a match titled "Eliminator"). While the winner of Qualifier 1 directly qualified for the final match, the losing team got another chance to qualify for the final match by playing the winning team of the Eliminator match; this match is titled Qualifier 2. The winner of this subsequent Qualifier 2 match moved onto the final match. The team that won the final match was crowned the Indian Premier League winners. The schedule for the tournament was published on 14 February 2018.

=== Broadcast ===
Star Sports won the global media rights at ₹16,347.5 crore ($2.55 billion) for five years starting from 2018. In India, the tournament will be broadcast on Star Network channels in six languages (English, Telugu, Kannada, Tamil, Bengali and Hindi). For the first time, IPL would also be broadcast on public broadcaster Doordarshan. The television rights for rest of the world were won by Willow TV for US and Canada, Sky Sports for UK, Fox Sports for Australia, Sky Sport for New Zealand, SuperSport for sub Saharan Africa, beIN Sports for Middle-East and North America, Flow TV for Caribbean, Geo Super for Pakistan, Channel 9 for Bangladesh and Lemar TV for Afghanistan. The radio rights were won by Cricket Radio globally (except Indian subcontinent), 89.1 Radio 4 FM and Gold 101.3 FM for US and Talksport for UK. Star's digital platform Hotstar held the digital rights for India, US and Canada. The digital rights for rest of the world were won by Sky Sports for UK, Fox Sports for Australia, Sky Sport for New Zealand, SuperSport for sub Saharan Africa, beIN Sports for Middle-East and North America, Flow TV for Caribbean, Geo Super for Pakistan, Channel 9 for Bangladesh and YuppTV for Australia, Europe, SE Asia & South America. Star India also announced its plan to broadcast IPL in Virtual Reality.

== Venues ==
Per the original schedule, all teams except for Kings XI Punjab, would play their home games at their traditional home venues. Kings XI were scheduled to play three of their home games in Indore and the other four games in Mohali. The schedule was later changed due to logistical issues owing to the temporary closure of Chandigarh Airport, and as a result, Kings XI would play three of their home games in Mohali and the other four games in Indore making an exception to the rule of playing at least four home matches at their designated home venue. The IPL matches in Chennai were threatened due to the Kaveri water dispute protests. The Madras High Court issued a notice to BCCI after an IPL was filed seeking a stay on the IPL matches in Chennai. On 11 April that Chennai's six remaining home matches would be held in Pune instead due to security concerns resulting from the protests.

Ten venues were selected to host the matches. The opening match and the final will be played at the Wankhede Stadium in Mumbai. The venues for the two playoffs were not announced initially due to the norm of allotting the Eliminator and second qualifier to the home stadium of last season's runner-up, and the fact that the 2015 runner-up, Chennai Super Kings were no longer a part of the IPL. Later, both playoffs were allotted to Pune but after the venue of Chennai Super Kings was moved there, the matches were shifted to Kolkata.

Bangalore	Delhi	Hyderabad
Royal Challengers Bangalore	Delhi Daredevils	Sunrisers Hyderabad
M. Chinnaswamy Stadium	Feroz Shah Kotla	Rajiv Gandhi International Cricket Stadium
Capacity: 35,000	Capacity: 41,000	Capacity: 55,000
Indore	2018 Indian Premier League is located in India	Jaipur
Kings XI Punjab	2018 Indian Premier League is located in India	Rajasthan Royals
Holkar Cricket Stadium	2018 Indian Premier League is located in India	Sawai Mansingh Stadium
Capacity: 30,000	2018 Indian Premier League is located in India	Capacity: 25,000
Kolkata	2018 Indian Premier League is located in India	Mohali
Kolkata Knight Riders and Playoffs	2018 Indian Premier League is located in India	Kings XI Punjab
Eden Gardens	2018 Indian Premier League is located in India	Punjab Cricket Association IS Bindra Stadium
Capacity: 68,000	2018 Indian Premier League is located in India	Capacity: 26,000
Mumbai	Pune	Chennai
Mumbai Indians and Playoffs	Chennai Super Kings	Chennai Super Kings
Wankhede Stadium	Maharashtra Cricket Association Stadium	M. A. Chidambaram Stadium
Capacity: 33,000	Capacity: 37,000	Capacity: 39,000

== Personnel changes ==
The IPL Governing Council announced that each IPL franchise could retain a maximum of five players from their respective current squads. Of the five players, a franchise could retain a maximum of three players through retention in lead up to the auction, and a maximum of three players through right-to-match card during the auction. The other restrictions on player retention were: a maximum of three capped Indian players could be retained, and only two overseas players and two uncapped Indian players could be retained. The salary cap for each team for the 2018 season was increased from ₹66 crore to ₹80 crore (approximately $12.4 million). A franchise was allowed to spend only ₹33 crore on retentions ahead of the 2018 IPL auction, leaving it at least ₹47 crore to spend at the auction.

IPL teams were asked to submit their retention list by 4 January. For the first time in IPL history, the player retention event was broadcast live on Star Sports. The IPL auction was held on 27 and 28 January at Bangalore a day after the final of the Syed Mushtaq Ali Trophy. 169 players (104 Indians and 56 Overseas) were sold at auction. Ben Stokes fetched the highest bid of ₹12.5 crore (US$1.95 million). Jaydev Unadkat was the most costly Indian player at ₹11.5 crore (US$1.80 million). Among uncapped players Krunal Pandya was most expensive at ₹8.8 crore(US$1.38 million). Many prominent players such as Lasith Malinga, Dale Steyn, Ishant Sharma, Hashim Amla, Martin Guptill and Joe Root remain unsold.

== Opening ceremony ==
The season had a single opening ceremony, unlike 2015 IPL, before the first match on 7 April. The ceremony included performances by Varun Dhawan, Prabhu Deva, Mika Singh, Tamannaah Bhatia, Jacqueline Fernandez and Hrithik Roshan.

== Teams and standings ==
=== Points table ===
Pos	Team	Pld	W	L	NR	Pts	NRR	
1	Sunrisers Hyderabad (RU)	14	9	5	0	18	0.284	Advanced to Qualifier 1
2	Chennai Super Kings (C)	14	9	5	0	18	0.253	Advanced to Qualifier 1
3	Kolkata Knight Riders (3)	14	8	6	0	16	−0.070	Advanced to the Eliminator
4	Rajasthan Royals (4)	14	7	7	0	14	−0.250	Advanced to the Eliminator
5	Mumbai Indians	14	6	8	0	12	0.317	
6	Royal Challengers Bangalore	14	6	8	0	12	0.129	
7	Kings XI Punjab	14	6	8	0	12	−0.502	
8	Delhi Daredevils	14	5	9	0	10	−0.222	

Source: ESPNcricinfo
The four top ranked teams qualify for the playoffs.

("C" refers to the "Champions" of the Tournament. '2', '3' and '4' are the positions of the respective teams in the tournament.)

=== Match summary ===
Team	Group matches														Playoffs			
Team	1	2	3	4	5	6	7	8	9	10	11	12	13	14	Q1	E	Q2	F
Chennai Super Kings	2	4	4	6	8	10	10	12	12	14	14	16	16	18	W			W
Delhi Daredevils	0	0	2	2	2	2	4	4	6	6	6	6	8	10				
Kings XI Punjab	2	2	4	6	8	10	10	10	12	12	12	12	12	12				
Kolkata Knight Riders	2	2	2	4	6	6	6	8	10	10	10	12	14	16		W	L	
Mumbai Indians	0	0	0	2	2	2	4	4	6	8	10	10	12	12				
Rajasthan Royals	0	2	4	4	4	6	6	6	6	8	10	12	12	14		L		
Royal Challengers Bengaluru	0	2	2	2	4	4	4	6	6	6	8	10	12	12				
Sunrisers Hyderabad	2	4	6	6	6	8	10	12	14	16	18	18	18	18	L		W	L

Win	Loss	No result

- Note: The total points at the end of each group match are listed.
- Note: Click on the points (group matches) or W/L (playoffs) to see the match summary.

Visitor team →	CSK	DD	KXIP	KKR	MI	RR	RCB	SRH
Home team ↓	CSK	DD	KXIP	KKR	MI	RR	RCB	SRH
Chennai Super Kings		Chennai; 13 runs	Chennai; 5 wickets	Chennai; 5 wickets	Mumbai; 8 wickets	Chennai; 64 runs	Chennai; 6 wickets	Chennai; 8 wickets
Delhi Daredevils	Delhi; 34 runs		Punjab; 4 runs	Delhi; 55 runs	Delhi; 11 runs	Delhi; 4 runs (DLS)	Bengaluru; 5 wickets	Hyderabad; 9 wickets
Kings XI Punjab	Punjab; 4 runs	Punjab; 6 wickets		Kolkata; 31 runs	Mumbai; 6 wickets	Punjab; 6 wickets	Bengaluru; 10 wickets	Punjab; 15 runs
Kolkata Knight Riders	Kolkata; 6 wickets	Kolkata; 71 runs	Punjab; 9 wickets (DLS)		Mumbai; 102 runs	Kolkata; 6 wickets	Kolkata; 4 wickets	Hyderabad; 5 wickets
Mumbai Indians	Chennai; 1 wicket	Delhi; 7 wickets	Mumbai; 3 runs	Mumbai; 13 runs		Rajasthan; 7 wickets	Mumbai; 46 runs	Hyderabad; 31 runs
Rajasthan Royals	Rajasthan; 4 wickets	Rajasthan; 10 runs (DLS)	Rajasthan; 15 runs	Kolkata; 7 wickets	Rajasthan; 3 wickets		Rajasthan; 30 runs	Hyderabad; 11 runs
Royal Challengers Bengaluru	Chennai; 5 wickets	Bengaluru; 6 wickets	Bengaluru; 4 wickets	Kolkata; 6 wickets	Bengaluru; 14 runs	Rajasthan; 19 runs		Bengaluru; 14 runs
Sunrisers Hyderabad	Chennai; 4 runs	Hyderabad; 7 wickets	Hyderabad; 13 runs	Kolkata; 5 wickets	Hyderabad; 1 wicket	Hyderabad; 9 wickets	Hyderabad; 5 runs	

Home team won	Visitor team won

- Note: Results listed are according to the home (horizontal) and visitor (vertical) teams.
- Note: Click on a result to see a summary of the match.

== League stage ==
=== Match results ===
7 April 2018
20:00 (D/N)
Scorecard

(H) Mumbai Indians; 165/4 (20 overs)	v	Chennai Super Kings; 169/9 (19.5 overs)
Suryakumar Yadav 43 (29); Shane Watson 2/29 (4 overs)		Dwayne Bravo 68 (30); Mayank Markande 3/23 (4 overs)

Chennai Super Kings won by 1 wicket
Wankhede Stadium, Mumbai
Umpires: Chris Gaffaney (New Zealand) and Nand Kishore (India)
Player of the match: Dwayne Bravo (Chennai Super Kings)

- Chennai Super Kings won the toss and elected to field.

8 April 2018
16:00 (D/N)
Scorecard

Delhi Daredevils; 166/7 (20 overs)	v	Kings XI Punjab (H); 167/4 (18.5 overs)
Gautam Gambhir 55 (42); Mujeeb Ur Rahman 2/28 (4 overs)		K. L. Rahul 51 (16); Daniel Christian 1/12 (2 overs)

Kings XI Punjab won by 6 wickets
Punjab Cricket Association Stadium, Mohali
Umpires: K. N. Ananthapadmanabhan (India) and Rod Tucker (Australia)
Player of the match: K. L. Rahul (Kings XI Punjab)

- Kings XI Punjab won the toss and elected to field.
- Mujeeb Ur Rahman (Kings XI Punjab) became the youngest cricketer to play in the IPL.
- K. L. Rahul (Kings XI Punjab) scored the fastest fifty in the IPL.

8 April 2018
20:00 (D/N)
Scorecard

Royal Challengers Bangalore; 176/7 (20 overs)	v	Kolkata Knight Riders (H); 177/6 (18.5 overs)
AB de Villiers 44 (23); Nitish Rana 2/11 (1 over)		Sunil Narine 50 (19); Chris Woakes 3/36 (4 overs)

Kolkata Knight Riders won by 4 wickets
Eden Gardens, Kolkata
Umpires: Abhijit Deshmukh (India) and Chettithody Shamshuddin (India)
Player of the match: Sunil Narine (Kolkata Knight Riders)

- Kolkata Knight Riders won the toss and elected to field.
- Brendon McCullum (Royal Challengers Bangalore) scored his 9,000th T20 run.

9 April 2018
20:00 (D/N)
Scorecard

Rajasthan Royals; 125/9 (20 overs)	v	Sunrisers Hyderabad (H); 127/1 (15.5 overs)
Sanju Samson 49 (42); Siddarth Kaul 2/17 (4 overs)		Shikhar Dhawan 78* (57); Jaydev Unadkat 1/28 (3 overs)

Sunrisers Hyderabad won by 9 wickets
Rajiv Gandhi International Cricket Stadium, Hyderabad
Umpires: Vineet Kulkarni (India) and Nigel Llong (England)
Player of the match: Shikhar Dhawan (Sunrisers Hyderabad)

- Sunrisers Hyderabad won the toss and elected to field.

10 April 2018
20:00 (D/N)
Scorecard

Kolkata Knight Riders; 202/6 (20 overs)	v	Chennai Super Kings (H); 205/5 (19.5 overs)
Andre Russell 88* (36); Shane Watson 2/39 (4 overs)		Sam Billings 56 (23); Tom Curran 2/39 (3 overs)

Chennai Super Kings won by 5 wickets
M. A. Chidambaram Stadium, Chennai
Umpires: Anil Chaudhary (India) and Chris Gaffaney (New Zealand)
Player of the match: Sam Billings (Chennai Super Kings)

- Chennai Super Kings won the toss and elected to field.

11 April 2018
20:00 (D/N)
Scorecard

(H) Rajasthan Royals; 153/5 (17.5 overs)	v	Delhi Daredevils; 60/4 (6 overs)
Ajinkya Rahane 45 (40); Shahbaz Nadeem 2/34 (4 overs)		Rishabh Pant 20 (14); Ben Laughlin 2/20 (2 overs)

Rajasthan Royals won by 10 runs (DLS method)
Sawai Mansingh Stadium, Jaipur
Umpires: K. N. Ananthapadmanabhan (India) and Nitin Menon (India)
Player of the match: Sanju Samson (Rajasthan Royals)

- Delhi Daredevils won the toss and elected to field.
- Rain during play ended the Rajasthan Royals innings at 17.5 overs and Delhi Daredevils were set a target of 71 runs from 6 overs.

12 April 2018
20:00 (D/N)
Scorecard

Mumbai Indians; 147/8 (20 overs)	v	Sunrisers Hyderabad (H); 151/9 (20 overs)
Evin Lewis 29 (17); Sandeep Sharma 2/25 (4 overs)		Shikhar Dhawan 45 (28); Mayank Markande 4/23 (4 overs)

Sunrisers Hyderabad won by 1 wicket
Rajiv Gandhi International Cricket Stadium, Hyderabad
Umpires: Nigel Llong (England) and C. K. Nandan (India)
Player of the match: Rashid Khan (Sunrisers Hyderabad)

- Sunrisers Hyderabad won the toss and elected to field.

13 April 2018
20:00 (D/N)
Scorecard

Kings XI Punjab; 155 (19.2 overs)	v	Royal Challengers Bangalore (H); 159/6 (19.3 overs)
K. L. Rahul 47 (30); Umesh Yadav 3/23 (4 overs)		AB de Villiers 57 (40); Ravichandran Ashwin 2/30 (4 overs)

Royal Challengers Bangalore won by 4 wickets
M. Chinnaswamy Stadium, Bangalore
Umpires: Abhijit Deshmukh (India) and Sundaram Ravi (India)
Player of the match: Umesh Yadav (Royal Challengers Bangalore)

- Royal Challengers Bangalore won the toss and elected to field.

14 April 2018
16:00 (D/N)
Scorecard

(H) Mumbai Indians; 194/7 (20 overs)	v	Delhi Daredevils; 195/3 (20 overs)
Suryakumar Yadav 53 (32); Daniel Christian 3/35 (3 overs)		Jason Roy 91* (53); Krunal Pandya 2/21 (3 overs)

Delhi Daredevils won by 7 wickets
Wankhede Stadium, Mumbai
Umpires: K. N. Ananthapadmanabhan (India) and Nitin Menon (India)
Player of the match: Jason Roy (Delhi Daredevils)

- Delhi Daredevils won the toss and elected to field.

14 April 2018
20:00 (D/N)
Scorecard

(H) Kolkata Knight Riders; 138/8 (20 overs)	v	Sunrisers Hyderabad; 139/5 (19 overs)
Chris Lynn 49 (34); Bhuvneshwar Kumar 3/26 (4 overs)		Kane Williamson 50 (44); Sunil Narine 2/17 (4 overs)

Sunrisers Hyderabad won by 5 wickets
Eden Gardens, Kolkata
Umpires: Anil Chaudhary (India) and Nand Kishore (India)
Player of the match: Billy Stanlake (Sunrisers Hyderabad)

- Sunrisers Hyderabad won the toss and elected to field.
- Shivam Mavi and Shubman Gill (both Kolkata Knight Riders) made their T20 debuts.

15 April 2018
16:00 (D/N)
Scorecard

Rajasthan Royals; 217/4 (20 overs)	v	Royal Challengers Bangalore (H); 198/6 (20 overs)
Sanju Samson 92* (45); Yuzvendra Chahal 2/22 (4 overs)		Virat Kohli 57 (30); Shreyas Gopal 2/22 (4 overs)

Rajasthan Royals won by 19 runs
M. Chinnaswamy Stadium, Bangalore
Umpires: Sundaram Ravi (India) and Chettithody Shamshuddin (India)
Player of the match: Sanju Samson (Rajasthan Royals)

- Royal Challengers Bangalore won the toss and elected to field.

15 April 2018
20:00 (D/N)
Scorecard

(H) Kings XI Punjab; 197/7 (20 overs)	v	Chennai Super Kings; 193/5 (20 overs)
Chris Gayle 63 (33); Shardul Thakur 2/33 (3 overs)		MS Dhoni 79* (44); Andrew Tye 2/47 (4 overs)

Kings XI Punjab won by 4 runs
Punjab Cricket Association Stadium, Mohali
Umpires: Vineet Kulkarni (India) and C. K. Nandan (India)
Player of the match: Chris Gayle (Kings XI Punjab)

- Chennai Super Kings won the toss and elected to field.

16 April 2018
20:00 (D/N)
Scorecard

(H) Kolkata Knight Riders; 200/9 (20 overs)	v	Delhi Daredevils; 129 (14.2 overs)
Nitish Rana 59 (35); Rahul Tewatia 3/18 (3 overs)		Glenn Maxwell 47 (22); Sunil Narine 3/18 (3 overs)

Kolkata Knight Riders won by 71 runs
Eden Gardens, Kolkata
Umpires: Anil Chaudhary (India) and Nand Kishore (India)
Player of the match: Nitish Rana (Kolkata Knight Riders)

- Delhi Daredevils won the toss and elected to field.

17 April 2018
20:00 (D/N)
Scorecard

(H) Mumbai Indians; 213/6 (20 overs)	v	Royal Challengers Bangalore; 167/8 (20 overs)
Rohit Sharma 94 (52); Umesh Yadav 2/36 (4 overs)		Virat Kohli 92* (62); Krunal Pandya 3/28 (4 overs)

Mumbai Indians won by 46 runs
Wankhede Stadium, Mumbai
Umpires: Nitin Menon (India) and Rod Tucker (Australia)
Player of the match: Rohit Sharma (Mumbai Indians)

- Royal Challengers Bangalore won the toss and elected to field.

18 April 2018
20:00 (D/N)
Scorecard

(H) Rajasthan Royals; 160/8 (20 overs)	v	Kolkata Knight Riders; 163/3 (18.5 overs)
D'Arcy Short 44 (43); Nitish Rana 2/11 (2 overs)		Robin Uthappa 48 (36); Krishnappa Gowtham 2/23 (4 overs)

Kolkata Knight Riders won by 7 wickets
Sawai Mansingh Stadium, Jaipur
Umpires: Abhijit Deshmukh (India) and Sundaram Ravi (India)
Player of the match: Nitish Rana (Kolkata Knight Riders)

- Kolkata Knight Riders won the toss and elected to field.

19 April 2018
20:00 (D/N)
Scorecard

(H) Kings XI Punjab; 193/3 (20 overs)	v	Sunrisers Hyderabad; 178/4 (20 overs)
Chris Gayle 104* (63); Bhuvneshwar Kumar 1/25 (4 overs)		Manish Pandey 57* (42); Andrew Tye 2/23 (4 overs)

Kings XI Punjab won by 15 runs
Punjab Cricket Association Stadium, Mohali
Umpires: Anil Chaudhary (India) and Nigel Llong (England)
Player of the match: Chris Gayle (Kings XI Punjab)

- Kings XI Punjab won the toss and elected to bat.

20 April 2018
20:00 (D/N)
Scorecard

(H) Chennai Super Kings; 204/5 (20 overs)	v	Rajasthan Royals; 140 (18.3 overs)
Shane Watson 106 (57); Shreyas Gopal 3/20 (4 overs)		Ben Stokes 45 (37); Karn Sharma 2/13 (1.3 overs)

Chennai Super Kings won by 64 runs
Maharashtra Cricket Association Stadium, Pune
Umpires: K. N. Ananthapadmanabhan (India) and Nitin Menon (India)
Player of the match: Shane Watson (Chennai Super Kings)

- Rajasthan Royals won the toss and elected to field.

21 April 2018
16:00 (D/N)
Scorecard

(H) Kolkata Knight Riders; 191/7 (20 overs)	v	Kings XI Punjab; 126/1 (11.1 overs)
Chris Lynn 74 (41); Andrew Tye 2/30 (4 overs)		Chris Gayle 62* (38); Sunil Narine 1/23 (3 overs)

Kings XI Punjab won by 9 wickets (DLS method)
Eden Gardens, Kolkata
Umpires: Abhijit Deshmukh (India) and Chettithody Shamshuddin (India)
Player of the match: K. L. Rahul (Kings XI Punjab)

- Kings XI Punjab won the toss and elected to field.
- Rain interrupted play after 8.2 overs of the Kings XI Punjab innings and the target was revised to 125 runs from 13 overs.

21 April 2018
20:00 (D/N)
Scorecard

Delhi Daredevils; 174/5 (20 overs)	v	Royal Challengers Bangalore (H); 176/4 (18 overs)
Rishabh Pant 85 (48); Yuzvendra Chahal 2/22 (3 overs)		AB de Villiers 90* (39); Glenn Maxwell 1/13 (2 overs)

Royal Challengers Bangalore won by 6 wickets
M. Chinnaswamy Stadium, Bangalore
Umpires: Chris Gaffaney (New Zealand) and C. K. Nandan (India)
Player of the match: AB de Villiers (Royal Challengers Bangalore)

- Royal Challengers Bangalore won the toss and elected to field.

22 April 2018
16:00 (D/N)
Scorecard

Chennai Super Kings; 182/3 (20 overs)	v	Sunrisers Hyderabad (H); 178/6 (20 overs)
Ambati Rayudu 79 (37); Bhuvneshwar Kumar 1/22 (3 overs)		Kane Williamson 84 (51); Deepak Chahar 3/15 (4 overs)

Chennai Super Kings won by 4 runs
Rajiv Gandhi International Cricket Stadium, Hyderabad
Umpires: Anil Chaudhary (India) and Vineet Kulkarni (India)
Player of the match: Ambati Rayudu (Chennai Super Kings)

- Sunrisers Hyderabad won the toss and elected to field.

22 April 2018
20:00 (D/N)
Scorecard

Mumbai Indians; 167/7 (20 overs)	v	Rajasthan Royals (H); 168/7 (19.4 overs)
Suryakumar Yadav 72 (47); Jofra Archer 3/23 (4 overs)		Sanju Samson 52 (39); Hardik Pandya 2/25 (2.4 overs)

Rajasthan Royals won by 3 wickets
Sawai Mansingh Stadium, Jaipur
Umpires: K. N. Ananthapadmanabhan (India) and Rod Tucker (Australia)
Player of the match: Jofra Archer (Rajasthan Royals)

- Mumbai Indians won the toss and elected to bat.

23 April 2018
20:00 (D/N)
Scorecard

Kings XI Punjab; 143/8 (20 overs)	v	Delhi Daredevils (H); 139/8 (20 overs)
Karun Nair 34 (32); Liam Plunkett 3/17 (4 overs)		Shreyas Iyer 57 (45); Ankit Rajpoot 2/23 (4 overs)

Kings XI Punjab won by 4 runs
Feroz Shah Kotla, Delhi
Umpires: C. K. Nandan (India) and Nand Kishore (India)
Player of the match: Ankit Rajpoot (Kings XI Punjab)

- Delhi Daredevils won the toss and elected to field.
- Prithvi Shaw (Delhi Daredevils) made his T20 debut.

24 April 2018
20:00 (D/N)
Scorecard

Sunrisers Hyderabad; 118 (18.4 overs)	v	Mumbai Indians (H); 87 (18.5 overs)
Kane Williamson 29 (21); Mayank Markande 2/15 (3 overs)		Suryakumar Yadav 34 (38); Siddarth Kaul 3/23 (4 overs)

Sunrisers Hyderabad won by 31 runs
Wankhede Stadium, Mumbai
Umpires: Sundaram Ravi (India) and Chettithody Shamshuddin (India)
Player of the match: Rashid Khan (Sunrisers Hyderabad)

- Mumbai Indians won the toss and elected to field.

25 April 2018
20:00 (D/N)
Scorecard

(H) Royal Challengers Bangalore; 205/8 (20 overs)	v	Chennai Super Kings; 207/5 (19.4 overs)
AB de Villiers 68 (30); Dwayne Bravo 2/33 (4 overs)		Ambati Rayudu 82 (53); Yuzvendra Chahal 2/26 (4 overs)

Chennai Super Kings won by 5 wickets
M. Chinnaswamy Stadium, Bangalore
Umpires: Nigel Llong (England) and Virender Sharma (India)
Player of the match: MS Dhoni (Chennai Super Kings)

- Chennai Super Kings won the toss and elected to field.

26 April 2018
20:00 (D/N)
Scorecard

(H) Sunrisers Hyderabad; 132/6 (20 overs)	v	Kings XI Punjab; 119 (19.2 overs)
Manish Pandey 54 (51); Ankit Rajpoot 5/14 (4 overs)		K. L. Rahul 32 (26); Rashid Khan 3/19 (4 overs)

Sunrisers Hyderabad won by 13 runs
Rajiv Gandhi International Cricket Stadium, Hyderabad
Umpires: Yeshwant Barde (India) and C. K. Nandan (India)
Player of the match: Ankit Rajpoot (Kings XI Punjab)

- Kings XI Punjab won the toss and elected to field.

27 April 2018
20:00 (D/N)
Scorecard

(H) Delhi Daredevils; 219/4 (20 overs)	v	Kolkata Knight Riders; 164/9 (20 overs)
Shreyas Iyer 93* (40); Andre Russell 1/28 (3 overs)		Andre Russell 44 (30); Glenn Maxwell 2/22 (2 overs)

Delhi Daredevils won by 55 runs
Feroz Shah Kotla, Delhi
Umpires: Sundaram Ravi (India) and Chettithody Shamshuddin (india)
Player of the match: Shreyas Iyer (Delhi Daredevils)

- Kolkata Knight Riders won the toss and elected to field.

28 April 2018
20:00 (D/N)
Scorecard

(H) Chennai Super Kings; 169/5 (20 overs)	v	Mumbai Indians; 170/2 (19.4 overs)
Suresh Raina 75* (47); Mitchell McClenaghan 2/26 (4 overs)		Rohit Sharma 56* (33); Harbhajan Singh 1/20 (3.5 overs)

Mumbai Indians won by 8 wickets
Maharashtra Cricket Association Stadium, Pune
Umpires: Chris Gaffaney (New Zealand) and Nitin Menon (India)
Player of the match: Rohit Sharma (Mumbai Indians)

- Mumbai Indians won the toss and elected to field.

29 April 2018
16:00 (D/N)
Scorecard

Sunrisers Hyderabad; 151/7 (20 overs)	v	Rajasthan Royals (H); 140/6 (20 overs)
Kane Williamson 63 (43); Jofra Archer 3/26 (4 overs)		Ajinkya Rahane 65* (53); Siddarth Kaul 2/23 (4 overs)

Sunrisers Hyderabad won by 11 runs
Sawai Mansingh Stadium, Jaipur
Umpires: Nand Kishore (India) and Bruce Oxenford (Australia)
Player of the match: Kane Williamson (Sunrisers Hyderabad)

- Sunrisers Hyderabad won the toss and elected to bat.

29 April 2018
20:00 (D/N)
Scorecard

(H) Royal Challengers Bangalore; 175/4 (20 overs)	v	Kolkata Knight Riders; 176/4 (19.1 overs)
Virat Kohli 68* (44); Andre Russell 3/31 (3 overs)		Chris Lynn 62* (52); Murugan Ashwin 2/36 (4 overs)

Kolkata Knight Riders won by 6 wickets
M. Chinnaswamy Stadium, Bangalore
Umpires: Anil Chaudhary (India) and Nigel Llong (England)
Player of the match: Chris Lynn (Kolkata Knight Riders)

- Kolkata Knight Riders won the toss and elected to field.

30 April 2018
20:00 (D/N)
Scorecard

(H) Chennai Super Kings; 211/4 (20 overs)	v	Delhi Daredevils; 198/5 (20 overs)
Shane Watson 78 (40); Glenn Maxwell 1/5 (1 over)		Rishabh Pant 79 (45); K. M. Asif 2/43 (3 overs)

Chennai Super Kings won by 13 runs
Maharashtra Cricket Association Stadium, Pune
Umpires: Anil Dandekar (India) and Chettithody Shamshuddin (India)
Player of the match: Shane Watson (Chennai Super Kings)

- Delhi Daredevils won the toss and elected to field.
- Chennai Super Kings recorded their 100th T20 victory.

1 May 2018
20:00 (D/N)
Scorecard

(H) Royal Challengers Bangalore; 167/7 (20 overs)	v	Mumbai Indians; 153/7 (20 overs)
Manan Vohra 45 (31); Hardik Pandya 3/28 (3 overs)		Hardik Pandya 50 (42); Tim Southee 2/25 (4 overs)

Royal Challengers Bangalore won by 14 runs
M. Chinnaswamy Stadium, Bangalore
Umpires: Marais Erasmus (South Africa) and Nitin Menon (India)
Player of the match: Tim Southee (Royal Challengers Bangalore)

- Mumbai Indians won the toss and elected to field.

2 May 2018
20:00 (D/N)
Scorecard

(H) Delhi Daredevils; 196/6 (17.1 overs)	v	Rajasthan Royals; 146/5 (12 overs)
Rishabh Pant 69 (29); Jaydev Unadkat 3/46 (4 overs)		Jos Buttler 67 (26); Trent Boult 2/26 (3 overs)

Delhi Daredevils won by 4 runs (DLS method)
Feroz Shah Kotla, Delhi
Umpires: C. K. Nandan (India) and Virender Sharma (India)
Player of the match: Rishabh Pant (Delhi Daredevils)

- Rajasthan Royals won the toss and elected to field.
- Rain before start of play reduced the match to 18 overs per side.
- Rain during play ended the Delhi Daredevils innings at 17.1 overs and Rajasthan Royals were set a target of 151 runs from 12 overs.

3 May 2018
20:00 (D/N)
Scorecard

Chennai Super Kings; 177/5 (20 overs)	v	Kolkata Knight Riders (H); 180/4 (17.4 overs)
MS Dhoni 43* (25); Sunil Narine 2/20 (4 overs)		Shubman Gill 57* (36); Harbhajan Singh 1/20 (3 overs)

Kolkata Knight Riders won by 6 wickets
Eden Gardens, Kolkata
Umpires: Abhijit Deshmukh (India) and Kumar Dharmasena (Sri Lanka)
Player of the match: Sunil Narine (Kolkata Knight Riders)

- Kolkata Knight Riders won the toss and elected to field.

4 May 2018
20:00 (D/N)
Scorecard

(H) Kings XI Punjab; 174/6 (20 overs)	v	Mumbai Indians; 176/4 (19 overs)
Chris Gayle 50 (40); Jasprit Bumrah 1/19 (4 overs)		Suryakumar Yadav 57 (42); Mujeeb Ur Rahman 2/37 (4 overs)

Mumbai Indians won by 6 wickets
Holkar Cricket Stadium, Indore
Umpires: Anil Dandekar (India) and Sundaram Ravi (India)
Player of the match: Suryakumar Yadav (Mumbai Indians)

- Mumbai Indians won the toss and elected to field.

5 May 2018
16:00 (D/N)
Scorecard

Royal Challengers Bangalore; 127/9 (20 overs)	v	Chennai Super Kings (H); 128/4 (18 overs)
Parthiv Patel 53 (41); Ravindra Jadeja 3/18 (4 overs)		Ambati Rayudu 32 (25); Umesh Yadav 2/15 (3 overs)

Chennai Super Kings won by 6 wickets
Maharashtra Cricket Association Stadium, Pune
Umpires: Yeshwant Barde (India) and Nitin Menon (India)
Player of the match: Ravindra Jadeja (Chennai Super Kings)

- Chennai Super Kings won the toss and elected to field.

5 May 2018
20:00 (D/N)
Scorecard

Delhi Daredevils; 163/5 (20 overs)	v	Sunrisers Hyderabad (H); 164/3 (19.5 overs)
Prithvi Shaw 65 (36); Rashid Khan 2/23 (4 overs)		Alex Hales 45 (31); Amit Mishra 2/19 (4 overs)

Sunrisers Hyderabad won by 7 wickets
Rajiv Gandhi International Cricket Stadium, Hyderabad
Umpires: C. K. Nandan (India) and Bruce Oxenford (Australia)
Player of the match: Rashid Khan (Sunrisers Hyderabad)

- Delhi Daredevils won the toss and elected to bat.

6 May 2018
16:00 (D/N)
Scorecard

(H) Mumbai Indians; 181/4 (20 overs)	v	Kolkata Knight Riders; 168/6 (20 overs)
Suryakumar Yadav 59 (39); Andre Russell 2/12 (2 overs)		Robin Uthappa 54 (35); Hardik Pandya 2/19 (4 overs)

Mumbai Indians won by 13 runs
Wankhede Stadium, Mumbai
Umpires: Abhijit Deshmukh (India) and Kumar Dharmasena (Sri Lanka)
Player of the match: Hardik Pandya (Mumbai Indians)

- Kolkata Knight Riders won the toss and elected to field.

6 May 2018
20:00 (D/N)
Scorecard

Rajasthan Royals; 152/9 (20 overs)	v	Kings XI Punjab (H); 155/4 (18.4 overs)
Jos Buttler 51 (39); Mujeeb Ur Rahman 3/27 (4 overs)		K. L. Rahul 84* (54); Krishnappa Gowtham 1/18 (3 overs)

Kings XI Punjab won by 6 wickets
Holkar Cricket Stadium, Indore
Umpires: Sundaram Ravi (India) and Chettithody Shamshuddin (India)
Player of the match: Mujeeb Ur Rahman (Kings XI Punjab)

- Kings XI Punjab won the toss and elected to field.

7 May 2018
20:00 (D/N)
Scorecard

(H) Sunrisers Hyderabad; 146 (20 overs)	v	Royal Challengers Bangalore; 141/6 (20 overs)
Kane Williamson 56 (39); Mohammed Siraj 3/25 (4 overs)		Virat Kohli 39 (30); Shakib Al Hasan 2/36 (4 overs)

Sunrisers Hyderabad won by 5 runs
Rajiv Gandhi International Cricket Stadium, Hyderabad
Umpires: Bruce Oxenford (Australia) and Virender Sharma (India)
Player of the match: Kane Williamson (Sunrisers Hyderabad)

- Royal Challengers Bangalore won the toss and elected to field.

8 May 2018
20:00 (D/N)
Scorecard

(H) Rajasthan Royals; 158/8 (20 overs)	v	Kings XI Punjab; 143/7 (20 overs)
Jos Buttler 82 (58); Andrew Tye 4/34 (4 overs)		K. L. Rahul 95* (70); Krishnappa Gowtham 2/12 (3 overs)

Rajasthan Royals won by 15 runs
Sawai Mansingh Stadium, Jaipur
Umpires: Marais Erasmus (South Africa) and Nitin Menon (India)
Player of the match: Jos Buttler (Rajasthan Royals)

- Rajasthan Royals won the toss and elected to bat.

9 May 2018
20:00 (D/N)
Scorecard

Mumbai Indians; 210/6 (20 overs)	v	Kolkata Knight Riders (H); 108 (18.1 overs)
Ishan Kishan 62 (21); Piyush Chawla 3/48 (4 overs)		Chris Lynn 21 (15); Krunal Pandya 2/12 (3.1 overs)

Mumbai Indians won by 102 runs
Eden Gardens, Kolkata
Umpires: K. N. Ananthapadmanabhan (India) and Anil Chaudhary (India)
Player of the match: Ishan Kishan (Mumbai Indians)

- Kolkata Knight Riders won the toss and elected to field.

10 May 2018
20:00 (D/N)
Scorecard

(H) Delhi Daredevils; 187/5 (20 overs)	v	Sunrisers Hyderabad; 191/1 (18.5 overs)
Rishabh Pant 128* (63); Shakib Al Hasan 2/27 (4 overs)		Shikhar Dhawan 92* (50); Harshal Patel 1/32 (4 overs)

Sunrisers Hyderabad won by 9 wickets
Feroz Shah Kotla, Delhi
Umpires: Anil Dandekar (India) and Chettithody Shamshuddin (India)
Player of the match: Shikhar Dhawan (Sunrisers Hyderabad)

- Delhi Daredevils won the toss and elected to bat.
- Sunrisers Hyderabad qualified for the playoffs as a result of this match.

11 May 2018
20:00 (D/N)
Scorecard

Chennai Super Kings; 176/4 (20 overs)	v	Rajasthan Royals (H); 177/6 (19.5 overs)
Suresh Raina 52 (35); Jofra Archer 2/42 (4 overs)		Jos Buttler 95* (60); Shardul Thakur 1/22 (4 overs)

Rajasthan Royals won by 4 wickets
Sawai Mansingh Stadium, Jaipur
Umpires: Yeshwant Barde (India) and Marais Erasmus (South Africa)
Player of the match: Jos Buttler (Rajasthan Royals)

- Chennai Super Kings won the toss and elected to bat.

12 May 2018
16:00 (D/N)
Scorecard

Kolkata Knight Riders; 245/6 (20 overs)	v	Kings XI Punjab (H); 214/8 (20 overs)
Sunil Narine 75 (36); Andrew Tye 4/41 (4 overs)		K. L. Rahul 66 (29); Andre Russell 3/41 (4 overs)

Kolkata Knight Riders won by 31 runs
Holkar Cricket Stadium, Indore
Umpires: C. K. Nandan (India) and Virender Sharma (India)
Player of the match: Sunil Narine (Kolkata Knight Riders)

- Kings XI Punjab won the toss and elected to field.

12 May 2018
20:00 (D/N)
Scorecard

(H) Delhi Daredevils; 181/4 (20 overs)	v	Royal Challengers Bangalore; 187/5 (19 overs)
Rishabh Pant 61 (34); Yuzvendra Chahal 2/28 (4 overs)		AB de Villiers 72* (37); Trent Boult 2/40 (4 overs)

Royal Challengers Bangalore won by 5 wickets
Feroz Shah Kotla, Delhi
Umpires: K. N. Ananthapadmanabhan (India) and Kumar Dharmasena (Sri Lanka)
Player of the match: AB de Villiers (Royal Challengers Bangalore)

- Royal Challengers Bangalore won the toss and elected to field.
- Sandeep Lamichhane and Abhishek Sharma (both Delhi Daredevils) made their T20 debuts.
- Delhi Daredevils were eliminated as a result of this match.

13 May 2018
16:00 (D/N)
Scorecard

Sunrisers Hyderabad; 179/4 (20 overs)	v	Chennai Super Kings (H); 180/2 (19 overs)
Shikhar Dhawan 79 (49); Shardul Thakur 2/32 (4 overs)		Ambati Rayudu 100* (62); Sandeep Sharma 1/36 (4 overs)

Chennai Super Kings won by 8 wickets
Maharashtra Cricket Association Stadium, Pune
Umpires: Yeshwant Barde (India) and Marais Erasmus (South Africa)
Player of the match: Ambati Rayudu (Chennai Super Kings)

- Chennai Super Kings won the toss and elected to field.

13 May 2018
20:00 (D/N)
Scorecard

(H) Mumbai Indians; 168/6 (20 overs)	v	Rajasthan Royals; 171/3 (18 overs)
Evin Lewis 60 (42); Jofra Archer 2/16 (4 overs)		Jos Buttler 94* (53); Hardik Pandya 2/52 (4 overs)

Rajasthan Royals won by 7 wickets
Wankhede Stadium, Mumbai
Umpires: Nitin Menon (India) and Sundaram Ravi (India)
Player of the match: Jos Buttler (Rajasthan Royals)

- Rajasthan Royals won the toss and elected to field.

14 May 2018
20:00 (D/N)
Scorecard

(H) Kings XI Punjab; 88 (15.1 overs)	v	Royal Challengers Bangalore; 92/0 (8.1 overs)
Aaron Finch 26 (23); Umesh Yadav 3/23 (4 overs)		Virat Kohli 48* (28); Ravichandran Ashwin 0/9 (1 over)

Royal Challengers Bangalore won by 10 wickets
Holkar Cricket Stadium, Indore
Umpires: Bruce Oxenford (Australia) and Virender Sharma (India)
Player of the match: Umesh Yadav (Royal Challengers Bangalore)

- Royal Challengers Bangalore won the toss and elected to field.
- Chennai Super Kings qualified for the playoffs and Sunrisers Hyderabad advanced to Qualifier 1 as a result of this match.

15 May 2018
20:00 (D/N)
Scorecard

Rajasthan Royals; 142 (19 overs)	v	Kolkata Knight Riders (H); 145/4 (18 overs)
Jos Buttler 39 (22); Kuldeep Yadav 4/20 (4 overs)		Chris Lynn 45 (42); Ben Stokes 3/15 (4 overs)

Kolkata Knight Riders won by 6 wickets
Eden Gardens, Kolkata
Umpires: Anil Chaudhary (India) and Kumar Dharmasena (Sri Lanka)
Player of the match: Kuldeep Yadav (Kolkata Knight Riders)

- Kolkata Knight Riders won the toss and elected to field.

16 May 2018
20:00 (D/N)
Scorecard

(H) Mumbai Indians; 186/8 (20 overs)	v	Kings XI Punjab; 183/5 (20 overs)
Kieron Pollard 50 (23); Andrew Tye 4/16 (4 overs)		K. L. Rahul 94 (60); Jasprit Bumrah 3/15 (4 overs)

Mumbai Indians won by 3 runs
Wankhede Stadium, Mumbai
Umpires: Marais Erasmus (South Africa) and Nitin Menon (India)
Player of the match: Jasprit Bumrah (Mumbai Indians)

- Kings XI Punjab won the toss and elected to field.

17 May 2018
20:00 (D/N)
Scorecard

(H) Royal Challengers Bangalore; 218/6 (20 overs)	v	Sunrisers Hyderabad; 204/3 (20 overs)
AB de Villiers 69 (39); Rashid Khan 3/27 (4 overs)		Kane Williamson 81 (42); Moeen Ali 1/21 (2 overs)

Royal Challengers Bangalore won by 14 runs
M. Chinnaswamy Stadium, Bangalore
Umpires: Anil Dandekar (India) and Sundaram Ravi (India)
Player of the match: AB de Villiers (Royal Challengers Bangalore)

- Sunrisers Hyderabad won the toss and elected to field.

18 May 2018
20:00 (D/N)
Scorecard

(H) Delhi Daredevils; 162/5 (20 overs)	v	Chennai Super Kings; 128/6 (20 overs)
Rishabh Pant 38 (26); Lungi Ngidi 2/14 (3 overs)		Ambati Rayudu 50 (29); Trent Boult 2/20 (4 overs)

Delhi Daredevils won by 34 runs
Feroz Shah Kotla, Delhi
Umpires: Kumar Dharmasena (Sri Lanka) and Vineet Kulkarni (India)
Player of the match: Harshal Patel (Delhi Daredevils)

- Chennai Super Kings won the toss and elected to field.

19 May 2018
16:00 (D/N)
Scorecard

(H) Rajasthan Royals; 164/5 (20 overs)	v	Royal Challengers Bangalore; 134 (19.2 overs)
Rahul Tripathi 80* (58); Umesh Yadav 3/25 (4 overs)		AB de Villiers 53 (35); Shreyas Gopal 4/16 (4 overs)

Rajasthan Royals won by 30 runs
Sawai Mansingh Stadium, Jaipur
Umpires: Bruce Oxenford (Australia) and Virender Sharma (India)
Player of the match: Shreyas Gopal (Rajasthan Royals)

- Rajasthan Royals won the toss and elected to bat.
- Royal Challengers Bangalore were eliminated as a result of this match.

19 May 2018
20:00 (D/N)
Scorecard

(H) Sunrisers Hyderabad; 172/9 (20 overs)	v	Kolkata Knight Riders; 173/5 (19.4 overs)
Shikhar Dhawan 50 (39); Prasidh Krishna 4/30 (4 overs)		Chris Lynn 55 (43); Carlos Brathwaite 2/21 (2.4 overs)

Kolkata Knight Riders won by 5 wickets
Rajiv Gandhi International Cricket Stadium, Hyderabad
Umpires: Anil Chaudhary (India) and Sundaram Ravi (India)
Player of the match: Chris Lynn (Kolkata Knight Riders)

- Sunrisers Hyderabad won the toss and elected to bat.
- Kolkata Knight Riders qualified for the playoffs as a result of this match.

20 May 2018
16:00 (D/N)
Scorecard

(H) Delhi Daredevils; 174/4 (20 overs)	v	Mumbai Indians; 163 (19.3 overs)
Rishabh Pant 64 (44); Krunal Pandya 1/11 (2 overs)		Evin Lewis 48 (31); Amit Mishra 3/19 (4 overs)

Delhi Daredevils won by 11 runs
Feroz Shah Kotla, Delhi
Umpires: Kumar Dharmasena (Sri Lanka) and C. K. Nandan (India)
Player of the match: Amit Mishra (Delhi Daredevils)

- Delhi Daredevils won the toss and elected to bat.
- Mumbai Indians were eliminated as a result of this match.

20 May 2018
20:00 (D/N)
Scorecard

Kings XI Punjab; 153 (19.4 overs)	v	Chennai Super Kings (H); 159/5 (19.1 overs)
Karun Nair 54 (26); Lungi Ngidi 4/10 (4 overs)		Suresh Raina 61* (48); Ankit Rajpoot 2/19 (4 overs)

Chennai Super Kings won by 5 wickets
Maharashtra Cricket Association Stadium, Pune
Umpires: Yeshwant Barde (India) and Nitin Menon (India)
Player of the match: Lungi Ngidi (Chennai Super Kings)

- Chennai Super Kings won the toss and elected to field.
- Rajasthan Royals qualified for the playoffs, Kings XI Punjab were eliminated and Chennai Super Kings advanced to Qualifier 1 as a result of this match.

== Playoffs ==
Qualifier 1 / Eliminator
22 May — Mumbai
1	Sunrisers Hyderabad	139/7 (20 overs)
2	Chennai Super Kings	140/8 (19.1 overs)
23 May — Kolkata
3	Kolkata Knight Riders	169/7 (20 overs)
4	Rajasthan Royals	144/4 (20 overs)

Qualifier 2
25 May — Kolkata
Q1L	Sunrisers Hyderabad	174/7 (20 overs)
EW	Kolkata Knight Riders	160/9 (20 overs)

Final
27 May — Mumbai
Q1W	Chennai Super Kings	181/2 (18.3 overs)
Q2W	Sunrisers Hyderabad	178/6 (20 overs)

=== Qualifier 1 ===
22 May
19:00 (D/N)
Scorecard

Sunrisers Hyderabad; 139/7 (20 overs)	v	Chennai Super Kings; 140/8 (19.1 overs)
Carlos Brathwaite 43* (29); Dwayne Bravo 2/25 (4 overs)		Faf du Plessis 67* (42); Rashid Khan 2/11 (4 overs)

Chennai Super Kings won by 2 wickets
Wankhede Stadium, Mumbai
Umpires: Marais Erasmus (South Africa) and Chettithody Shamshuddin (India)
Player of the match: Faf du Plessis (Chennai Super Kings)

- Chennai Super Kings won the toss and elected to field.

=== Eliminator ===
23 May
19:00 (D/N)
Scorecard

Kolkata Knight Riders; 169/7 (20 overs)	v	Rajasthan Royals; 144/4 (20 overs)
Dinesh Karthik 52 (38); Krishnappa Gowtham 2/15 (3 overs)		Sanju Samson 50 (38); Piyush Chawla 2/24 (4 overs)

Kolkata Knight Riders won by 25 runs
Eden Gardens, Kolkata
Umpires: Anil Chaudhary (India) and Nitin Menon (India)
Player of the match: Andre Russell (Kolkata Knight Riders)

- Rajasthan Royals won the toss and elected to field.

=== Qualifier 2 ===
25 May
19:00 (D/N)
Scorecard

Sunrisers Hyderabad; 174/7 (20 overs)	v	Kolkata Knight Riders; 160/9 (20 overs)
Wriddhiman Saha 35 (27); Kuldeep Yadav 2/29 (4 overs)		Chris Lynn 48 (31); Rashid Khan 3/19 (4 overs)

Sunrisers Hyderabad won by 14 runs
Eden Gardens, Kolkata
Umpires: Kumar Dharmasena (Sri Lanka) and Nitin Menon (India)
Player of the match: Rashid Khan (Sunrisers Hyderabad)

- Kolkata Knight Riders won the toss and elected to field.

=== Final ===
27 May
19:00 (D/N)
Scorecard

Sunrisers Hyderabad; 178/6 (20 overs)	v	Chennai Super Kings; 181/2 (18.3 overs)
Kane Williamson 47 (36); Ravindra Jadeja 1/24 (2 overs)		Shane Watson 117* (57); Carlos Brathwaite 1/27 (2.3 overs)

Chennai Super Kings won by 8 wickets
Wankhede Stadium, Mumbai
Umpires: Marais Erasmus (South Africa) and Sundaram Ravi (India)
Player of the match: Shane Watson (Chennai Super Kings)

- Chennai Super Kings won the toss and elected to field.

== Statistics ==
=== Most Runs ===
Player	Team	Mat	Inns	Runs	HS
Kane Williamson	Sunrisers Hyderabad	17	17	735	84
Rishabh Pant	Delhi Daredevils	14	14	684	128 not out
KL Rahul	Kings XI Punjab	14	14	659	95 not out
Ambati Rayudu	Chennai Super Kings	16	16	602	100 not out
Shane Watson	Chennai Super Kings	15	15	555	117 not out

- Kane Williamson of Sunrisers Hyderabad received the Orange Cap.
- Source: ESPNcricinfo

=== Most wickets ===
Player	Team	Mat	Inns	Wkts	BBI
Andrew Tye	Kings XI Punjab	14	14	24	4/16
Rashid Khan	Sunrisers Hyderabad	17	17	21	3/19
Siddarth Kaul	Sunrisers Hyderabad	17	17	21	3/23
Umesh Yadav	Royal Challengers Bangalore	14	14	20	3/23
Trent Boult	Delhi Daredevils	14	14	18	2/20

- Andrew Tye of Kings XI Punjab received the Purple Cap.
- Source: ESPNcricinfo

=== Awards ===
Player	Team	Award	Value
Rishabh Pant	Delhi Daredevils	Emerging player	₹10 lakh (US$10,000)
–	Mumbai Indians	Fairplay Award	Team trophy
Trent Boult	Delhi Daredevils	Best catch	₹10 lakh (US$10,000) and a phone
Sunil Narine	Kolkata Knight Riders	Super striker	₹10 lakh (US$10,000) and a car
Rishabh Pant	Delhi Daredevils	Stylish player	₹10 lakh (US$10,000)
MS Dhoni	Chennai Super Kings	Season award	₹10 lakh (US$10,000)
Andrew Tye	Kings XI Punjab	Most wickets	₹10 lakh (US$10,000)
Kane Williamson	Sunrisers Hyderabad	Most runs	₹10 lakh (US$10,000)
Sunil Narine	Kolkata Knight Riders	Most Valuable Player	₹10 lakh (US$10,000)

== See also ==
- 2018 Women's T20 Challenge
- List of Indian Premier League records and statistics
