= Saala (film) =

2024 Tamil action film

- Directed by: SD Manipaul
- Written by: SD Manipaul
- Produced by: TG Vishwa Prasad
- Starring: Dheeran; Reshma Venkatesh; Charles Vinoth; Aruldoss
- Cinematography: Ravindranath Guru
- Edited by: Bhuvan
- Music by: Theeseon
- Production company: People Media Factory
- Release date: 23 August 2024
- Country: India
- Language: Tamil

Saala is a 2024 Indian Tamil-language action thriller film written and directed by SD Manipaul in his directorial debut, starring debutant actors Dheeran and Reshma Venkatesh in the lead roles alongside Charles Vinoth, Aruldoss, Srinath, Sampath Ram, and IT Arasan in important roles. The film is produced by TG Vishwa Prasad under his People Media Factory banner. Saala was released in theatres on 23 August 2024 to mixed reviews from critics.

== Cast ==
- Dheeran as Solomon "Saala"
- Reshma Venkatesh as Punitha
- Charles Vinoth as Thangadurai
- Aruldoss as Guna
- Srinath
- Sampath Ram as an Inspector
- IT Arasan

== Production ==
The film is written and directed by SD Manipaul in his directorial debut, who had earlier worked as an assistant director to Prabhu Solomon, starring debutants Dheeran and Reshma Venkatesh in the lead roles alongside Charles Vinoth, Aruldoss, Srinath, Sampath Ram, and IT Arasan in important roles. The film is produced by TG Vishwa Prasad under his People Media Factory banner. The technical team includes cinematographer Ravindranath Guru, music composer Theeseon, and editor Bhuvan. Principal photography took place in North Chennai, after the relaxations of the COVID-19 restrictions.

== Release ==
=== Theatrical ===
Saala was released in theatres on 23 August 2024.

=== Home media ===
Saala premiered on aha Tamil on 20 September 2024.

== Reception ==
Saala received mixed reviews from critics.

Raghav Kumar of Kalki gave 3/5 stars and praised the social message against alcohol, cinematography, editing and the performance of Reshma, but criticized the screenplay and the background score. A critic of Dinamalar rated the film with 2.75/5 stars. Abhinav Subramanian of The Times of India gave 2.5/5 stars and wrote "Saala is a typical masala flick with a whiff of romance. [...] While it doesn’t break new ground in storytelling or filmmaking, director Manipaul infuses enough spice to keep viewers engaged." Abishek Balaji of Cinema Express gave 2.5/5 stars and wrote "Saala is still very watchable and truly thought-provoking at times. I just wish it had been fiercer and more focused." Hindu Tamil Thisai reviewed the film positively for its climax, the social message and the acting contributions from the entire cast.
