= Kabali =

2016 Indian film directed by Pa. Ranjith

- Theatrical release poster
- Directed by: Pa. Ranjith
- Written by: Pa. Ranjith
- Produced by: Kalaipuli S. Thanu
- Starring: Rajinikanth; Radhika Apte; Winston Chao; Dhansika
- Cinematography: Murali G.
- Edited by: Praveen K. L.
- Music by: Santhosh Narayanan
- Production company: V Creations
- Distributed by: Gemini Film Circuit; Maxlab Cinemas and Entertainments; Fox Star Studios; Malik Stream Corporations
- Release dates: 21 July 2016 (Malaysia); 22 July 2016 (India)
- Running time: 150 minutes
- Country: India
- Language: Tamil
- Budget: ₹100 crore
- Box office: ₹320 crore (Note: Kabali's reported worldwide gross was ₹320 crore (Box Office India))

Kabali is a 2016 Indian Tamil-language action drama film written and directed by Pa. Ranjith and produced by Kalaipuli S. Thanu under V Creations. The film stars Rajinikanth, Winston Chao, Radhika Apte, Sai Dhanshika, Kishore, Dinesh Ravi, Kalaiyarasan, John Vijay, Rosyam Nor, Nassar and Mime Gopi. In the film, Kabali, an aged gangster released from prison, sets out to exact revenge on his rivals while searching for his wife Kumudhavalli and daughter Yogitha who were presumed dead.

Principal photography for the film commenced on 21 August 2015 in Chennai. While filming mostly occurred in Malaysia, some scenes were shot in Bangkok and Hong Kong, with shoot being completed in February 2016. The music was composed by Santhosh Narayanan, while cinematography and editing were handled by Murali G., and Praveen K. L.

Kabali was released worldwide on 22 July 2016, in Tamil, and dubbed versions in Telugu and Hindi, with a premiere held in Malaysia on 21 July 2016, a day before its actual release. The film was released in Malay language on 29 July 2016 and received mixed to positive reviews from critics.

Kabali became the first Indian film to be officially released in Thailand, marking a significant milestone for Indian cinema's theatrical presence in the country.

At the Ananda Vikatan Cinema Awards, the film was nominated for five categories, winning all of them. The film received two awards out of eight nominations at the 64th Filmfare Awards South, with one for Best Supporting Actress (Sai Dhanshika). The film received eight nominations at the IIFA Utsavam 2017, winning one of them. The film won five awards, at the Edison Awards, and two nominations at the 6th South Indian International Movie Awards.

Kabali is the highest-grossing Tamil film at the time, with a worldwide gross estimated ₹320+ crore, until it was surpassed by 2.0 in 2018. The movie became the highest grossing Tamil movie of 2016, highest grossing South Indian movie of 2016 and 3rd highest grossing Indian movie of 2016.

== Plot ==
A Kuala Lumpur–based crime boss Kabaleeswaran alias Kabali is released after spending 25 years in prison on a false charge of starting a massacre at a local temple that killed many, including his wife Kumudhavalli. His opposite gang group '43' consists of 4 people: Tony Lee, a rival Malaysian crime boss; Veerasekaran alias Veera, Tony's chief lieutenant; Loganathan alias Loga, the main drug supplier and Seeni, who is the main money launderer. Kabali soon reunites with his old gang mate Ameer, where he also confronts Seeni and injures him badly.

Loga encounters Kabali and tells him that if his wife was alive, Veera would have sold her for prostitution, Kabali became enraged and drives his car on Loga, killing him. However, this incident makes Kabali think that Kumudha may be still alive. Later, Kabali survives an assassination attempt by Tamizh Kumaran alias Kumaran, whose father Tamilmaaran was killed by Kabali in the temple massacre when Kumaran was a young child, he also met Kabali on the day he released. The next day, at a function organised by the Free Life Foundation School, a school started by Kabali and his friend Ameer to reform youngsters involved in criminal activities, Tamizh Kumaran also works there as a teacher. There, Kabali talks about his past and mentions how the Tamil community in general have the "Crabs in the bucket mentality" which was the reason to his downfall.

Past: Kabali was the protege of Tamilmaaran's father Tamilnesan, a crime boss who fought for the rights of Tamil Malaysians. Tamilnesan was killed by Veera who was a member of his gang who disliked his rules such as not involving in illegal activities. There were also his gang friends, Tony Lee, Velu and Loga. Following Tamilnesan's death, Kabali took charge of Tamilnesan's gang. Veera provoked Tamilmaaran by telling him that he, being Tamilnesan's son, should lead the gang and not Kabali. He immediately opposed, but relented where Tamilmaaran invited Kabali and a pregnant Kumudha for a temple function in Madurai as forgiveness. However, this was revealed to be a trap as Veera and his men confronted Kabali and Kumudha at the function. In the ensuing scuffle, Kabali was brutally attacked while Kumudha was shot and seemingly killed by Tony Lee. Kabali then killed Tamilmaaran for his betrayal in front of a young Kumaran and was soon arrested on a false charge of instigating the massacre.

Present: Kumaran, after hearing Kabali's speech, realises his mistake and apologises to him. He tells him that Velu, who was present at the temple massacre, is aware of what happened to Kumudha. Kabali then leaves for Thailand, where Velu is residing. On confronting Velu, he learns that his daughter is still alive. At this juncture, Kabali is confronted by Yogi, a contract killer hired by Veera and Tony Lee. Yogi instead kills Seeni and his men who had come with her to kill Kabali, and reveals herself as Kabali's daughter, who had been raised by Velu. On that night, Tony Lee's henchman shot Kabali and was taken to the hospital. When Kabali recovers, he calls Tony Lee giving him a heads up that he is coming back to hunt him. Yogi tells Kabali that Kumudha is still alive and is living with a French family in Pondicherry. Kabali, Yogi and others leave for Pondicherry, where, after several days of searching, they reunite with Kumudha.

While in Pondicherry, Kabali and his family are attacked by men sent by Tony. However, Kabali and Yogi fight them off and escape safely with Kumudha. Kabali and his family soon return to Kuala Lumpur, where he is told that Ameer has been severely injured in a car accident set up by Tony; his henchman Jeeva was brutally chopped to pieces after refusing to join Gang 43; they also had destroyed the Free Life Foundation School and started to control the Kuala Lumpur underworld, eliminating any gang who dared to oppose them. On hearing all this, Kabali decides to finish Veera and Tony. He and his family attend the 100th birthday party for a respected Malaysian don Ang Lee. At the party, Kabali destroys the Gang 43's activities by providing a tip to the police. After this, Kabali kills Veera and instigates a gangwar where he, Yogi and Kumaran massacre Tony's gang. Eventually Kabali corners Tony and guns him down.

Some months later, Kabali, Kumudha, Kumaran, and Yogi attend a function organised by the Free Life Foundation. One of the Free Life alumni, a youngster named Tiger, who is known to be aggressive and reckless, walks up to Kabali, with scenes showing him speaking to the police prior to the function. The screen cuts to black, and the sound of a gun clicking and a gunshot afterwards is heard.

== Cast ==
- Rajinikanth as Kabaleeswaran (Kabali), the head of the Malaysian Gangster group '00'.
- Winston Chao as Tony Lee, head of Gang '43', and Kabali's enemy
- Radhika Apte as Kumudhavalli Kabaleeswaran (Kumudha), Kabali's wife and Yogi's mother
- Dhansika as Yogitha Kabaleeswaran (Yogi), Kabali's and Kumudha's daughter, who is a contract killer in Thailand.
- Kishore as Veerasekaran (Veera), the second head of '43'
- Dinesh as Jeeva, Kabali's gang member.
- Kalaiyarasan as Tamizh Kumaran (Kumaran), Tamilnesan's grandson and Tamilmaaran's son. He is a teacher in Kabali's school.
- John Vijay as Ameer, Kabali's sidekick/trusted aide.
- Rosyam Nor as Pak Bacak, Tony's sidekick
- Nassar as Tamizh Nesan, the founder of '00' to protect Malaysian Tamizhans (Guest Appearance)
- Riythvika as Meena, a drug-addicted girl who joins Kabali's school to stay safe from drugs. Later, Kabali adopts her as his daughter.
- Sangili Murugan as Palace Owner
- Charles Vinoth as Tamizh Maaran, Tamizha Nesan's son and Kabali's best friend.
- Mime Gopi as Loganathan, '43' second main member to do drug supply.
- R. Amarendran as Velu
- Lijeesh as Seeni, '43' main member to do money laundry.
- Vanessa Cruez as Singari
- Visvanth as Jai
- Hari Krishnan as Tiger, a school student who encounters Kabali in the end.
- Gajaraj as Marthandam, Kabali's teammate in young, but later works for Gang '43'.
- Sampath Ram as Sampath, Kabali's teammate.
- Rama as Mallika
- Uday Mahesh as Durai
- Gabriella Sellus
- Nandakumar as Anbu
- Ramesh Thilak as a Malaysian Tamil
- Soundarya Bala Nandakumar as Pub Singer in "Thendral Vanthu" song
- Darkkey Nagaraja as a singer in "Ulagam Oruvanukka" song
- Norman Hakim as Tony Lee's bodyguard
- Yank Kassim as Malaysian Thug
- Zack Taipan as Malaysian Thug

== Production ==
=== Pre Production ===
In March 2015, Rajinikanth was reported to sign his next film with A. R. Murugadoss and backed by V. Ravichandran of Aascar Films; the project was reported to be put on hold until Rajinikanth's issue with the distributors over the financial losses of his film Lingaa (2014), being sorted out. However, the project failed to materialise, citing Ravichandran's bankruptcy. Rajnikanth discussed the idea of remaking Drishyam (2013), in Tamil, with producer Kalaipuli S. Thanu. But the latter was not interested in the remake. In January 2016, Gautham Vasudev Menon narrated the script of Dhruva Natchathiram to producer Thanu, who set up a meeting for Menon to discuss the script with Rajinikanth. The actor liked the idea of the film, but later turned down the offer, citing his age. Rajinikanth had been impressed with Pa. Ranjith's work in Madras (2014) and subsequently Rajinikanth's daughter, Soundarya asked Ranjith to work on a script for her father.

=== Development ===
In June 2015, director Pa. Ranjith announced his third directorial venture, which would follow his previous two films Attakathi (2012) and Madras (2014), with Rajinikanth, via Twitter, and Thanu was announced to bankroll the project. Kabali would make Rajinikanth's first film with a novel director, for the first time, since his collaboration with S. Shankar in 2007, with Sivaji. In an interview with IndiaGlitz, producer S. Thanu revealed that Rajinikanth had personally asked him to produce the Ranjith-directed film. The producer's commercially successful Bairavi (1978) was Rajinikanth's first lead role film and the two had not collaborated since. It was speculated that Rajinikanth's role would be based on a real-life mob boss from Chennai. Santhosh Narayanan was confirmed as the film's music composer, continuing his partnership with Ranjith after the latter's previous two films. Ranjith also retained G. Murali, the cinematographer of Madras.

On 17 August 2015, Ranjith announced the title of the film to be Kabali and that Rajinikanth would play the role of Kabaliswaran. The makers of the film had earlier considered using title Kaali, which was the title of Rajinikanth's 1980 film. As that film did not do well in the Tamil Nadu box office at the time, the makers passed on using it for the new film. Another title, Kannabhiran, was also considered but it was later found that the title's rights were already held by director Ameer Sultan for a future film.

=== Casting ===
In the film, Rajinikanth plays the role of an aged crime boss. According to the Telugu newspaper Eenadu, Rajinikanth, after being impressed with Nayakan (1987), requested its director Mani Ratnam to write a similar script, but the project never materialised; its similarities with Ranjith's script for Kabali made him accept to star in the latter film. Dinesh Ravi, who played the lead in Ranjith's Attakathi (2012), and Kalaiyarasan, who played pivotal roles in both of the director's previous films, were also confirmed to be part of the film. An important role was offered to Prakash Raj initially, but later it was said that the role was declined due to scheduling issues and John Vijay was cast for the role instead. It was later confirmed that the role of the lead character's wife would be given to Radhika Apte, who was introduced to Tamil films through Dhoni (2012). Sai Dhanshika was signed to play a supporting character in the film. Soundarya Nandakumar, a television actress best known for her participation in Star Vijay's Airtel Super Singer 3, was chosen for a cameo appearance.

=== Filming ===
On 18 August 2015, director Pa Ranjith announced on his Twitter page that principal photography would begin the following week, which was confirmed on 22 August when Rajinikanth had allotted 106 days for the film.

Originally planned for a longer schedule for 50 days in Malaysia, the makers planned to reduce the number of days of shoot in the country, and planned to shoot for 20 days at the specially erected construction sets at the EVP Film City and Adityaram Studios in Chennai. Adityaram Studios located in the East Coast Road owned by Aditya Ram. A month long schedule in Malaysia, took place from 19 October. The crew members had obtained permission from the Malaysian Tourism Department, to shoot in the state of Melaka in Malaysia. and also obtained permission for shooting in the Hindu cemetery belonging to the management of Sri Subramaniar Temple located in Sepang on 4 November. Rajinikanth joined the sets two days before the schedule on 2 November, where major portions of the film being shot at the Kuala Lumpur Convention Centre, Batu Caves and Bandar Sunway. After wrapping the Malaysia shooting schedule on 21 November, Rajinikanth joined the second leg of the shoot took place at Bangkok on 24 November. Later the film's lead actress Radhika Apte, started shooting for few important sequences at Goa in December 2015.

Rajinikanth who is simultaneously shooting for 2.0, also kickstarted on the penultimate schedule of the film at EVP Film City in Chennai, where action sequences featuring the lead antagonist Winston Chao and Rosyam Nor were filmed. The final schedule of Kabali was shot in Malaysia on 2 February 2016, with Radhika Apte joining the sets on 7 February. Few scenes of the film were shot at the Carey Island, located at the south of Port Klang in Malaysia. The actor completed the shoot and returned from Malaysia on 16 February.

== Music ==
Santhosh Narayanan composed the film's soundtrack album and background score, collaborating with Rajinikanth for the first time. The album features five songs with lyrics written by Kabilan, Vivek, Umadevi and Arunraja Kamaraj and one song was released as a bonus track after the film's release, which was not included in the film. Think Music acquired the film's audio rights. After multiple postponements, the film's soundtrack album was released on 12 June 2016. The soundtrack was also released in Telugu, Hindi and Malay, where the Hindi version was released along with the Tamil version, the Telugu version was released on 26 June, whereas the Malay version was released on 1 July. The soundtrack received predominantly positive responses from all corners, with many celebrities praising Santhosh for his work. A bonus track was released on 24 August 2016, post-release.

== Release ==
=== Theatrical ===
Rajinikanth revealed the release plans of Kabali, that the film would begin post-production activities in April and would release in June 2016. However, the film's release was postponed to 1 July, then to 15 July, which caused confusion from the makers. Later, it was clarified that the film would release on 22 July 2016. Kabali, became the first Tamil film to be dubbed and released in Malay. Malik Streams Productions and Distribution, a Malaysian media company, will simultaneously release the film in Malay for exclusive screening in Malaysia alongside the original Tamil version.

Kabali is the first Indian film to be released in Le Grand Rex in Paris, France, the world's largest movie hall which has a seating capacity of 2,000. Mohanlal bought the Kerala distribution rights of the film, under his Max Lab Cinemas, for ₹9 crores, and planned to release the film in 150 theatres in Kerala. Popular theatres in Bengaluru bought advance bookings, in which tickets were sold up to ₹500. The film was planned to screen at star hotels in Bengaluru, cashing up to ₹1,300per ticket, which did not happen as the permission for release on star hotels were rejected. There were no special previews in Chennai, which was clarified by the producer.

Kabali was released in Tamil worldwide, along with dubbed versions in Hindi and Telugu, on 22 July 2016. The film's Malaysian premiere took place on 21 July 2016. However, the Tamil version of the film was screened at the premiere. The Malay version was released on 29 July 2016. The film was scheduled to be released simultaneously in Singapore and Indonesia. The film was also dubbed in Mandarin and Thai languages, and was released in Hong Kong, China and Thailand.

=== Marketing ===
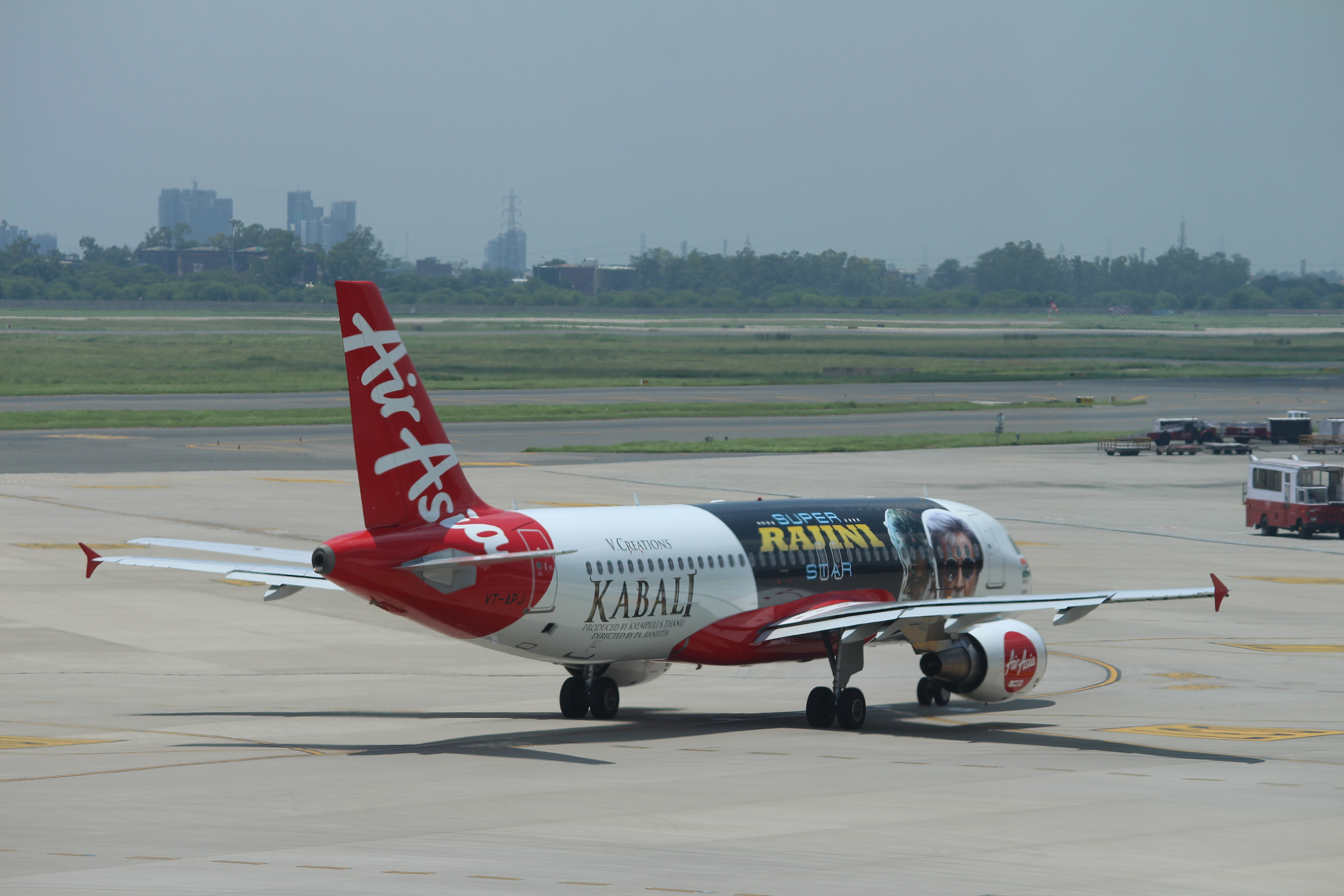
An Airbus A320 of AirAsia India wrapped, promoting Kabali

The first look posters of Kabali was released on 16 September 2015, a day before the commencent of the film's shoot. It was also known that the poster was released along with the trailer of Kamal Haasan's Thoongaavanam (2015). The teaser of the film was released on 1 May 2016. The teaser broke records with maximum views of 10 million in 3 days, becoming the highest viewed Indian film teaser.

After the airline AirAsia India became an official partner for Kabali, an Airbus A320 owned by the airline was wrapped with the film's title and an image of Rajinikanth depicted as Kabaleeshwaran. It was the first time a passenger jet had been wrapped for advertising an Indian film. The Indian financial company Muthoot FinCorp who is also an official partner of the film produced silver coins embossed with the image of actor as cast in the film.

=== Home media ===
The satellite rights of Kabali and Theri (another film produced by S. Thanu), were remained unsold as of March 2017, despite the digital rights being sold to Amazon Prime Video. On 27 September 2017, Sun TV announced that they have bought the rights of Theri and Kabali. The film's world television premiere took place on 15 January 2018, coinciding with Thai Pongal, one-and-half years after its release. While Star India bought the rights for the film's dubbed Hindi, Telugu and Malayalam versions.

== Controversies ==
=== Online piracy issue ===
On 19 July 2016, three days prior to the film's worldwide release, it was reported that pirated copies of the film were leaked online in darknet. The Indian Express reported that although the leaked copies were available only in the darknet, many fake links were being circulated in the web. The makers of the film had approached Madras High Court in anticipation of piracy and had requested the authority to ensure that it does not happen. CBFC chief Pahlaj Nihalani commented on the issue by saying that the leak had nothing to do with his office in Mumbai and reiterated the fact that Kabali, a Tamil film, was certified by CBFC's Chennai office. He also added that the leak would not have much effect on the film's box office collection.

Two days later, on 21 July 2016, a two-minute long sequence of the film was also leaked online, which subsequently went viral on an instant messaging app, WhatsApp. Commenting on the leak, producer Kalaippuli S Thanu said, "Watching Thalaivar entry on phone or computer won't give you goosebumps. Say thank you to pirates, let's watch it in theaters from Friday" through his Twitter account. The News Minute reported that the sequence leak, which carried English as well as Arabic subtitles, could have been released from Gulf countries.

Following the film's release, a partial copy which had been filmed with a mobile phone in a cinema was posted to Vimeo, but was subsequently removed from the website.

=== Alternate ending ===
The Malaysian version of the film proceeds beyond the fade to black and offers a concrete ending, stating that Kabali surrendered to the police. This alternate ending was created at the behest of Film Censorship Board of Malaysia, which does not allow showcasing of policemen encouraging violence.

=== Caste depiction ===
The protagonist, Kabali, is specifically depicted in the film as a Dalit (a term for marginalised caste groups in India) which engendered controversy with some groups viewing it as a form of caste politics. Though Dalit organisations appreciated the positive portrayal; scholar Stalin Rajangam opined it to be a response to the 2012 Dharmapuri violence against Dalits.

== Reception ==
=== Box office ===
The film collected ₹48.95 crore (US$7.28 million) in first day, ₹110 crore (US$16.37 million) in first weekend, with a total domestic collection of ₹185 crore (US$27.53 million).Kabali had the highest worldwide opening day for a South Indian film, surpassing the record set by Baahubali: The Beginning by earning ₹875 million (US$13.02 million) on the first day. The film also had the highest 3-day opening weekend for an Indian film surpassing the ₹2.06 billion (US$30.66 million) record set by Sultan two weeks earlier as it earned ₹2.11 billion (US$31.4 million).

==== Disputed gross figures ====
Box office gross of ₹650 crore was reported by Financial Express in August 2016, which was more than double the estimates made by other sources, because of wrongly adding the film's pre-release earnings of over ₹200 crore, through the sales of music and satellite rights, as analysed by Firstpost, according to which the film's actual theatrical box office collection was only ₹300 crore. According to Indian Express, the film had earned ₹211 crore in India and ₹259 crore overseas. In December 2016, Financial Express reported that the film had an estimated domestic gross of ₹215 crore and an overseas gross of ₹262 crore. According to Box Office India in January 2022, the film's final worldwide gross was ₹320 crore.

==== India ====
Kabali had the highest opening day for a South Indian film in terms of gross revenue, grossing ₹53 crore on the first day of its release in India from all the languages and was just behind the 2015 film Prem Ratan Dhan Payo for the highest first day gross in India. It also became the first Tamil film to gross ₹21.5 crore in a single day from Tamil Nadu. The film earned the highest first weekend nett collection of ₹109.25 crore in India at that time.

==== Other territories ====
Kabali grossed US$15.70 million (₹105 crore) till its tenth day. The film had earned US$11.20 million (₹75.27 crore) in its first four-day weekend overseas, breaking the record previously held by Dhoom 3 (US$10.32 million) as the highest-grossing first weekend for an Indian film in overseas markets.

=== Critical response ===
Kabali was a highly anticipated film throughout the country, but the film received mixed reviews. On the review aggregator website Rotten Tomatoes, 53% of 15 critics' reviews are positive, with an average rating of 5.7/10.

Anupama Subramanian of Deccan Chronicle, rated 2.5 out of 5 stars stating "Kabali is an intelligent, noir-esque piece of cinema that is dark, broody, and measured." The Indian Express rated the movie 3.5 out of 5 and said that, "Take away the dramatic script and lagging screenplay and Kabali is an unusual Rajinikanth film, which manages to combine the actor's mass appeal with a nuanced character. And hey, we get to see Rajini play his age finally!" Baradwaj Rangan of The Hindu wrote "Ranjith's filmmaking is different too, and not in a good way. Kabali does have some of his trademarks, but the life that infused his earlier films is missing." Thinkal Menon from The Times of India rated 3 out of 5 stating "The story, perhaps, needed a tighter screenplay, but watch it for ‘Thalaivar athiradi’. Nothing more, nothing less!" India Today rated 3 out of 5 stars stating "Kabali falls short of performance as far as the supporting cast is concerned. Pa Ranjith could have easily roped in some well-known actors from the industry who could actually bring some flavour to their roles. Making a film with Rajinikanth is nearly close to jeopardising one's career with an ignominious defeat at one's own peril. Because there are certain elements expected of a Rajinikanth film to cater to his ardent fans, even if the actor is prepared to look old on screen." Hindustan Times rated 3 out of 5 stating "For Thalaivar fans, it'll be hard to tell. Though Rajinikanth shines, he has a long career in which Kabali doesn't quite fit." Sify rated 3 out of 5 stating "Kabali is neither a Rajinikanth film nor a Ranjith film — it's a mixed bag!"

While Rajinikanth's performance was well-received, the overall plot drew some comment. Jeyannathann Karunanithi of online film magazine The World of Apu pointed out that the audience in India would need to understand the socio-political situation of the Tamil Indian diaspora in Malaysia for better understanding of the plot. The criticism from Malaysian Indians was largely directed at the inaccuracy in its portrayal of the racial tensions and dynamics in Malaysia. Like the Tamil Indian community, the Chinese are also a minority in Malaysia and likewise disadvantaged by the government's pro-Malay majority policies, known as Ketuanan Melayu. Racial tensions were much more rife between the politically dominant Malays and the Chinese, who were in a more economically dominant position as business owners or urbanised blue-collar professionals. The Indians were largely employed on rubber plantations and had been affected by the decline of the industry during the 1980s, leaving many former plantation workers to migrate to the cities and forced to join a gang when unable to find work. As such, the dissatisfaction from the Indian community has been largely directed at the Malay-majority government and its pro-Malay policies, rather than specifically at the Chinese community.

== Records ==
Multilingual release reach: It was released in multiple languages (Tamil, Telugu, Hindi, Malayalam) and was among the first Tamil films planned for extensive releases in several international markets.

First Indian film in Thailand: Kabali became the first Indian film to be officially released in Thailand.

== Sequel ==
Shortly after the film's success, in an interview with Don Groves, S. Thanu said that the initial results exceeded his expectations and that the film's ending sets up a sequel. On 25 July 2016, he spoke, "We created an open climax for Kabali. So, director Ranjith and I are interested in a sequel for this gangster flick. However, Rajinikanth will have to give us the nod to carry on. The film's collections indicate that it is a sensational hit, and has surpassed all records".

== Legacy ==
The song "Neruppu Da" inspired the title of a 2017 film starring Vikram Prabhu. The title was kept as the film portrayed Vikram Prabhu as a firefighter and a fan of Rajinikanth.
