= Vijay Award for Best Villain =

Indian film award

The Vijay Award for Best Villain was an award given by STAR Vijay as part of its annual Vijay Awards ceremony for Tamil (Kollywood) films. The Vijay awards ceremony ran from 2007 to 2017.

== The list ==
This is a list of the award winners and the films for which they won.

Year	Actor	Film	Link
2017	S. J. Surya	Spyder	
2014	Bobby Simha	Jigarthanda	
2013	Arjun Sarja	Kadal	
2012	Sudeep	Naan Ee	
2011	Ajith Kumar	Mankatha	
2010	Rajnikanth	Endhiran	
2009	Rajendran	Naan Kadavul	
2008	Kamal Haasan	Dasavathaaram	
2007	Kishore	Polladhavan	

== Nominations ==
- 2007 Kishore - Polladhavan
  - Kalabhavan Mani - Vel
  - Milind Soman - Pachaikili Muthucharam
  - Prakash Raj - Pokkiri
  - Suman - Sivaji
- 2008 Kamal Haasan - Dasavathaaram
  - Kishore - Jayamkondaan
  - Nassar - Poi Solla Porom
  - Sampath Raj - Saroja
- 2009 Rajendran - Naan Kadavul
  - J. D. Chakravarthy - Sarvam
  - Nandha - Eeram
  - Sachin Khedekar - Yaavarum Nalam
  - Salim Ghouse - Vettaikaaran
- 2010 Rajinikanth - Enthiran
  - A. L. Azhagappan - Easan
  - A. Venkatesh - Angadi Theru
  - Prakash Raj - Singam
  - Vinod Kishan - Naan Mahaan Alla
- 2011 Ajith Kumar - Mankatha
  - Jackie Shroff - Aaranya Kaandam
  - John Vijay - Mouna Guru
  - Johnny Tri Nguyen - 7am Arivu
  - V. I. S. Jayapalan - Aadukalam
- 2012 Sudeep - Naan E
  - Muthuraman - Vazhakku Enn 18/9
  - Narain - Mugamoodi
  - Thambi Ramiah - Saattai
  - Vidyut Jamwal - Thuppakki
- 2013 Arjun - Kadal
  - Rahul Bose - Vishwaroopam
  - Sharath Lohitashwa - Pandiya Naadu
  - Vamsi Krishna - Ivan Veramathiri
  - Yog Japee - Soodhu Kavvum
- 2014 Bobby Simha - Jigarthanda
  - Prashant Narayanan - Nedunchaalai
  - Prithviraj - Kaaviya Thalaivan
  - Charles Vinoth - Madras
  - Vijay Murugan - Goli Soda

== See also ==
- Tamil cinema
- Cinema of India
