= 2018 Tamil Nadu protests for Kaveri water sharing =

Dispute on Cauvery river water sharing

2018 Kaveri water sharing protests
- Part of the Kaveri River water dispute
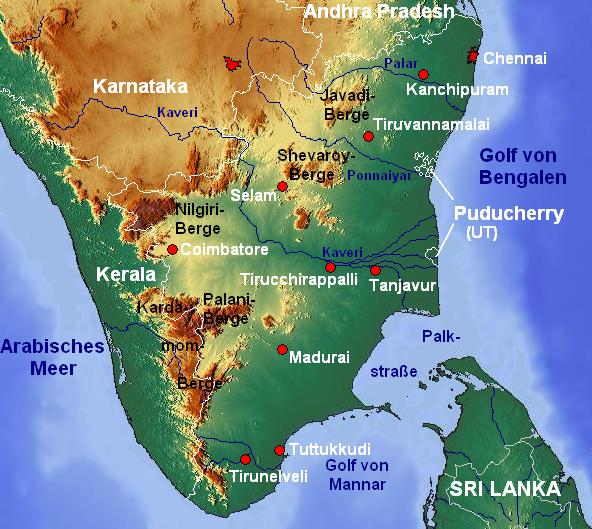
- Cauvery river flows into Karnataka state and then into the Tamil Nadu state
- Location: Tamil Nadu, India
- Caused by: requesting an equal share of Cauvery river water to Tamil Nadu, Karnataka, Puducherry and Kerala

The 2018 Kaveri River water sharing protests are a series of ongoing protests on the issue of water sharing problems from the River Kaveri between Tamil Nadu and Karnataka which are two states in India. The Kaveri water dispute has been a major controversial issue between Tamil Nadu and Karnataka over the years and the issue has been raised further with protests have been conducted across the state of Tamil Nadu by several groups including from the large pile of actors and directors who have temporarily stopped working on their projects, films over the Karnataka's sharing the Kaveri water to Tamil Nadu. The delay in establishing a Cauvery Management Board in order to share equal river share award has sparked off protests in Tamil Nadu against the Karnataka state government.

Several film makers of the Tamil film industry has also criticised and threatened to postpone the IPL matches involving Chennai Super Kings which are to be held in Chennai as a part of the 2018 Indian Premier League season as Chennai Super Kings making their comeback into the IPL league after 2 years as they were serving a 2-year ban along with Rajasthan Royals over the 2013 IPL betting scandal. This situation in Tamil Nadu has been a major concern along with the Nadigar Sangam's strike against the increase of VPF charges which has left the South Indian state vulnerable with no new film releases for about 50 days.

The 2018 Karnataka Legislative Assembly election which was a major concern in the state of Karnataka following the breakout of major Kaveri river water scandal has heaped in among several political dramatic turnarounds in the state with both main politicians B. S. Yeddyurappa and Siddaramaiah being historically defeated at the assembly elections.

== Background ==
The genesis of this conflict rests in two agreements in 1892 and 1924 between the Madras Presidency and Kingdom of Mysore. The 802 kilometres (498 mi) Cauvery river has a 44,000 km^{2} basin area in Tamil Nadu and 32,000 km^{2} basin area in Karnataka. The inflow from Karnataka is 425 TMC ft whereas that from Tamil Nadu is 252 TMCft.

However the Karnataka state does not agree with the sharing of drinking water with the South Indian state, Tamil Nadu, which has been followed according to the British era agreement. The state also believes that the British agreement is a very old one and needs to be renewed because of the rainfall patterns. Karnataka desperately wanted to receive more water share from the River Cauvery and this would ultimately reduce the share of water to South Indian states such as Tamil Nadu, Puducherry and Kerala. Due to these arguments this has been the unsolved issue between the two states in the recent times.

On the other hand, there have been numerous criticisms and controversies regarding Karnataka and Tamil Nadu in the past, as the state has failed to deliver an expected water level to Tamil Nadu in the previous years due to draught despite the court order which has advised the Karnataka government to supply the amount which is expected by Tamil Nadu. Whereas Tamil Nadu has often demanded its complete share without considering the facts of insufficient rains and draught situation in Karnataka.

== Development ==
Supreme Court (SC) on 8 January 2018 declared that it would pronounce its verdict clearing all the pending cases and the confusion within a month. On 16 February 2018, the Supreme Court has pronounced its verdict. The Supreme Court urged to reduce 14 tmc water allocation to Tamil Nadu and requested Karnataka to release only 177 tmc of water to Tamil Nadu for next 15 years. The verdict also mandated to formally constitute the Cauvery river management board by the union government within 40 days for implementing strictly the tribunal award and its verdict.

The government of Karnataka expressed its displeasure in setting up the Cauvery Management Board, which was instituted to monitor water availability and use, as per the verdict of the Supreme Court. Union government also indicated that it was uncomfortable with the SC verdict, specifically to form the Cauvery management board within the stipulated period.

The re-allocation of water between the states of Tamil Nadu and Karnataka by the three-member SC bench is considered as deviation from earlier rulings given by bigger benches of the Supreme Court, in terms of changing the water allocations to a state by reviewing water allocations of a tribunal. As per Article 262 of the Indian Constitution, the role of the Supreme Court in an interstate water dispute is limited only to the interpretation and implementation of the tribunal order and to examine whether tribunal exceeded its limit by violating the constitution and the Interstate River Water Disputes Act.

However, the Supreme Court pulled out to establish the Cauvery Management Board as the Union Government failed to submit the documents within the deadline. It instructed the Union Government to formulate and draft the Cauvery Management scheme by 3 May. The Supreme Court also directed the authorities of both Tamil Nadu and Karnataka to maintain calm and peace till the changes were implemented .

With the Union government ignoring the Supreme court verdict to prepare a plan for Cauvery water management board within the time limit and the reason mentioned for that in the court is the law and order situation in Karnataka, tensions mounted among the people in Tamil Nadu. ^{[citation?]}

On 18 May, the Supreme Court ordered that a marginal increase of 14.75 TMC of water is to be supplied to Karnataka while Tamil Nadu would receive 177 TMC of water, in total.

== Reactions ==
The farmers in Tamil Nadu state buried themselves in the banks of the Kaveri river as they were not able to receive sufficient water which is necessary for farming. The farmers also demanded to establish the Cauvery Management Board to solve the water crisis.

On 7 April, the DMK chief M.K Stalin led the protests from Trichi to recover the Cauvery water sharing rights from Karnataka. On 11 April, the PMK followed and proceeded a rail strike and harthal from morning to evening.

The home matches of the Chennai Super Kings in the 2018 IPL season are under threat following the Cauvery river dispute and about 4000 security personnel were deployed in wake of the homecoming match for CSK against the Kolkata Knight Riders on 10 April 2018 at the M. A. Chidambaram Stadium. Amidst the IPL boycott threat over the Cauvery water controversy, the fans came in huge crowd to welcome and support the Chennai Super Kings team in the home soil during the clash against KKR. During the 8th over of the contest between CSK and KKR, few spectators who were inside the Chepauk Stadium threw shoes near the boundary line which fell close to Ravindra Jadeja who was fielding near the boundary rope.

Madras high court issued a notice to BCCI after a PIL was filed seeking stay on IPL. The IPL chief, Rajiv Shukla earlier announced that the IPL matches would proceed in Chennai as usual and ordered the security officials to provide extra security for the upcoming IPL matches which are to be held in Chennai.

However, later BCCI announced that the all 6 home matches of Chennai Super Kings are to be shifted out from hosting them in Chennai as the cops, security personnel couldn't able to control the protesters. The protesters were protesting against hosting the IPL matches outside the M.A Chidambaram Stadium and shown their undesire by burning the jerseys of CSK franchise. It was earlier rumoured that Dhoni's home city, Ranchi could be the neutral venue for the home matches of the Chennai Super Kings team. The home matches of the team were also assumed by the reports to be hosted in the state of Kerala. The Board of Control for Cricket in India later revealed that Pune would be the new temporary home ground for CSK.

On 8 April, the Tamil Film Fraternity organized a silent protest at Valluvar Kottam in Chennai. Veteran actors, including Sathyaraj, Rajinikanth, Kamal Haasan, Vijay, Dhanush, and Vishal joined the protest, demanding the Central Government to resolve the dispute. Rajinikanth, Kamal Haasan and Sathyaraj also requested the CSK cricket team players to wear black badges and black bands to show the support for the protests against Karnataka on the Kaveri water share issue. Tamil actor Silambarasan, who stayed away from the protest, clarified his stance in a press meet. He mentioned that he believes that the people of Karnataka have no issues in sharing Cauvery water with Tamil Nadu. He condemned the politicising efforts of the media and various political parties. He further requested the people of Karnataka to share a glass of water to their Tamil friends and post videos of the same on social networks, as a symbol of their truce with the people of Tamil Nadu. While this provoked criticism and ridicule in Tamil Nadu, it was well-received in Karnataka. And as requested by Simbu, on 11 April, between 3pm and 6pm, a large number of Kannada people in and around Bengaluru started posting photos of them physically handing over bottles of water to their Tamil friends. Actor Anant Nag appreciated Silambarasan for being more matured than Kamal Haasan and Rajinikanth in this issue and criticised both the veteran Tamil actors Rajnikanth and Kamal Haasan stating that the actors are trying to politicising the Kaveri water share between the two states. Despite some controversies, Simbu's initiative has managed to bring about a significant change in the mindset of people of both states.

RJ Balaji, a RJ turned actor who regularly works as a commentator for the Star Sports Tamil, a leading sports channel in India which has got the rights from hosting the 2018 IPL matches refrained himself from doing commentary just prior to the start of the match between Kolkata Knight Riders and Chennai Super Kings as the protests broke out against hosting the Indian Premier League matches in the Tamil Nadu capital on the cause of Cauvery issue. RJ Balaji also hinted that he would not work as a commentator for the upcoming matches involving Chennai Super Kings. He also later slammed the people of Tamil Nadu for the shift of the IPL league matches from Chennai to a different neutral venue and also argued that it is not correct to stop the professionals from doing their jobs in a peaceful way after he was forced to quit commentary on IPL matches.

The Indian Prime minister Narendra Modi was also scheduled to visit Tamil Nadu on 12 April to inaugurate the Def-Expo, infrastructure projects and the Dravida Munnetra Kazhagam chief, M. K. Stalin stated that the opposition party would waive black flags during Modi's visit to the ravaged state. The opposition party DMK has also asked the people to hoist black flags in the wake of the Prime Minister's visit in order to oppose his visit.

=== Downfall in Tamil film industry ===
The Kollywood had earlier planned not to release local Tamil language films in Tamil Nadu as of 1 March 2018 due to the conflicts between Nadigar Sangam and Digital Service Providers on the increase of VPF charges which has tremendously affected the South Indian film industry. It is expected that the film industry has been kept losing 2–3 crores daily due to the standoff between Tamil Film Producers Council and cinema theatres in Tamil Nadu.

In addition to the continuous Tamil film industry strike over the VPF charges which was started around March, in April the industry has also called the boycott over the IPL matches in Chennai and also continued their motive by not to release Tamil films over the Cauvery water row. The Kollywood proceeded their hunger strike until the establishment of the Cauvery Management Board to solve the water crisis. The film industry had also stopped shooting for their upcoming important movies including Sarkar, Viswasam and NGK until 19 April. Rajinikanth's upcoming mass budgeted films such as Kaala and 2.0 have also postponed to be released after the month of April as they were expected to be released in April coinciding the CSK IPL matches. Mercury, a silent thriller film of Prabhu Deva was released in other states of India on 13 April 2018 whereas in Tamil Nadu the film had delay in its release and was finally released on 20 April soon after the Kollywood's decision to end its strike on 19 April. This film was also the first film to have been released in Tamil Nadu around 50 days. Karthik Subbaraj, the director of the film Mercury apologised for not releasing the film in Tamil following the industry's continuous strike since March 2018 which resulted in a huge loss to the film industry within a month.

On 19 April 2018, the film industry finally ended their strike even without the establishing of the Kaveri Management Board and pointed out to release new films in Tamil Nadu despite the continuous protests over the water sharing issue. The social media and CSK supporters deeply criticised the Tamil film industry for allowing new Tamil film releases in the state even without the construction of the Cauvery Management Board but to boycott the IPL matches involving Chennai Super Kings in Chennai.

==== Ban on Kaala release in Karnataka ====
The Karnataka Film Chamber and Commerce stated that the Kaala film which is scheduled to be released on 7 June would be banned from its theatrical release in Karnataka citing the Rajinikanth's influence over the Kaveri water share dispute where he went onto criticise the Karnataka state and the government for not issuing the sufficient amount of water to Tamil Nadu. Actor Vishal stated that necessary actions would be proceeded with immediate effect to lift the ban on Kaala's theatrical release in Karnataka.

=== Karnataka election polls 2018 ===
The 2018 Karnataka Legislative Assembly election which was held on 12 May 2018 sparked criticisms from Tamil Nadu over the Karnataka's government for not addressing the issue properly and for its delay in setting up a Kaveri Management Board. The Supreme Court also issued a strict notice to the Karnataka state government for using the Karnataka Legislative state election as an excuse to resolve the Kaveri riverwater crisis with Tamil Nadu cannot be acceptable.

== See also ==
- 2017 pro-jallikattu protests
- Thoothukudi violence
