= Charles Vinoth =

Indian actor

- Born: 20 April 1973 (age 53)
- Occupation: Actor
- Years active: 2014–present

Charles Vinoth is an Indian actor who has appeared in Tamil language films as a supporting actor.

== Career ==
After completing his education, Vinoth briefly began a career in shipping before losing passion in the area. Vinoth has since been a regular in the Chennai theatre scene, working with the production house Dr. Shoe Maker. Vinoth entered the film industry and received his breakthrough with roles in two consecutive film by Pa. Ranjith. His work as the antagonist in Madras (2014) won him a nomination for Vijay Award for Best Villain, while he was also cast alongside Rajinikanth in Kabali (2016). Away from work with Ranjith, Vinoth has also played negative characters Massu Engira Masilamani (2015) and Yeidhavan (2017).

== Filmography ==
Year	Film	Role	Notes
2014	Madras	Maari	
2015	Massu Engira Masilamani	Madhivadhanan "Madhi"	
2016	Kabali	Tamizh Maaran	
2017	Bairavaa	MLA	
2017	8 Thottakkal	Bhaskar	
2017	Yeidhavan	Chidambaram	
2018	Traffic Ramasamy		
2018	Kolamavu Kokila	Mohan	
2021	Pon Manickavel	Kailash	
2021	Anti Indian	Subramani	
2021	Gaadi Ulla Body		
2022	Kadamaiyai Sei	Raj	
2022	Natchathiram Nagargiradhu	Sekar	
2022	One Way		
2022	Rathasaatchi	Narayana	
2023	Theerkadarishi		
2023	Infinity		
2023	Paramporul		
2024	Pogumidam Vegu Thooramillai	Shanmugam	
2024	Saala	Thangadurai	
2025	Gevi		
2025	Kumaara Sambavam		
