= Murali G. =

Indian cinematographer

- Born: Uthangarai, Krishnagiri District, Tamil Nadu, India
- Education: FTII, Pune
- Occupation: Cinematographer
- Years active: 2010-present

Murali G. is an Indian cinematographer who works mainly in Tamil cinema and Telugu cinema. An alumnus of the Film and Television Institute of India (FTII), Pune, he won the National Film Award for Best Non-Feature Film Cinematography in 2011.

== Early life ==
Murali was born and brought up in the village near Uthangarai, Krishnagiri district, Tamil Nadu. He did his schooling in Uthangarai and upon completion of his school, he was engaged as a social worker and got involved with the student wing of Communist party of India for more than a year before joining a music college. He enrolled himself at the Government Arts College, Kumbakonam for a degree in fine arts and later joined the Film and Television Institute of India, Pune, to do a course in motion picture photography. He assisted Rajeev Ravi in Anurag Kashyap's Dev.D (2009), before making his feature film debut with the Andala Rakshasi (2012). His subsequent films: Madras (2014), Kabali (2016), Kaala (2018), and Sarpatta Parambarai (2021), were all directed by Pa. Ranjith.

== Filmography ==
Year	Film	Language	Notes
2010	Shyam Raat Seher	Hindi; English	Short film; National Film Award for Best Non-Feature Film Cinematography
2012	Andala Rakshasi	Telugu	
2014	Madras	Tamil	SIIMA Award for Best Tamil Cinematographer
2016	Kabali	Tamil	
2018	Kaala	Tamil	
2021	Sarpatta Parambarai	Tamil	
2023	Kushi	Telugu	
2024	Saripodhaa Sanivaaram	Telugu	
