= Madras (film) =

2014 Indian film by Pa. Ranjith

- Theatrical release poster
- Directed by: Pa. Ranjith
- Written by: Pa. Ranjith
- Produced by: K. E. Gnanavel Raja; S. R. Prakashbabu; S. R. Prabhu
- Starring: Karthi; Catherine Tresa; Kalaiyarasan
- Cinematography: Murali G.
- Edited by: Praveen K. L.
- Music by: Santhosh Narayanan
- Production company: Studio Green
- Distributed by: Dream Factory; Studio Green; Kalasangham Films
- Release date: 26 September 2014
- Running time: 148 minutes
- Country: India
- Language: Tamil
- Budget: ₹15 crore
- Box office: ₹44 crore

Madras is a 2014 Indian Tamil-language political action drama film written and directed by Pa. Ranjith. The film stars Karthi, Catherine Tresa (marking her debut in Tamil cinema) and Kalaiyarasan, while Charles Vinoth, Riythvika, V. I. S. Jayapalan, Poster Nandakumar and Mime Gopi play supporting roles. Set in North Madras, the film portrays Kaali (Karthi) and his friend Anbu (Kalaiyarasan) getting embroiled in a brutal political rivalry, between two factions of a political party after laying claim to a wall.

Madras is the second directorial venture of Ranjith after Attakathi. Before the film's announcement, Karthi and Ranjith decided to collaborate for a different project in December 2012, which failed to materialise. Later Ranjith announced this project in July 2013. Principal photography commenced on 11 October 2013 at Vyasarpadi in Chennai. Most of the film's shooting was done in localities in and around the northern part of the city, namely Kasimedu, a locality in the Royapuram area of north Chennai, Otteri and Perambur. The film's title was announced in May 2014. Filming wrapped up by June 2014.

The film was produced and distributed by Studio Green in association with Dream Factory. Santhosh Narayanan composed the soundtrack and score, while the cinematography and editing were handled by Murali G. and Praveen K. L. respectively. After multiple delays, the film was released on 26 September 2014. The film received critical acclaim, praising the technical aspects, direction, screenwriting and cast performances (particularly Karthi and Kalaiyarasan). At the 62nd Filmfare Awards South, Madras was nominated in eleven categories, winning four. At the 9th Vijay Awards, it received fifteen nominations and won three awards. The film won six 4th South Indian International Movie Awards, seven Ananda Vikatan Cinema Awards and four Edison Awards.

== Plot ==
Kaali is an impulsive and short-tempered working-class man who works in an IT company and enjoys playing football during his free time. His best friend is Anbu, a young political aspirant. They live in the dilapidated flats of a housing board in Vyasarpadi, North Chennai, along with their friends. In a long-standing bloody feud, two political party factions have been laying claim to a wall on which they can paint the portraits of their respective political leaders. Anbu, under the local leader of one of the parties, Maari, is determined to claim that wall for their party. Kannan, the chief's party, and his son, Perumal, are hell-bent on ensuring their opponent's efforts go in vain. The painting of Kannan's father, Krishnappan, has been on the wall for two decades since the start of the feud.

The two parties and their supporters get into frequent clashes and scrapes. In the meantime, Kaali falls in love with a politician's daughter, Kalaiarasi, but she remains indifferent to him. In a spur of motivation due to the upcoming elections, Anbu reserves the wall for their party. Although the wall is in their area and technically theirs, the opposition asks Anbu to give it up as the portrait of their patriarch's portrait had been there for quite some time. Moreover, since three people had previously been killed in connection to the wall, including members from both parties, people have started to consider the wall a bad omen. When Anbu declines, a goon of Kannan starts insulting Anbu, and Kaali attacks him, leading to Kannan seeing Anbu as the reason for Maari's resurgence. Kannan's henchmen plan to kill Anbu and Kaali. Kalaiarasi professes her love to Kaali.

When the henchmen try to kill Kaali and Anbu, they escape and hide behind a van. They see Perumal, who does not notice them, talking on the phone, giving orders to kill Anbu at any cost. Kaali then kills Perumal with a straight hit to the head using a crowbar. Maari instructs Kaali and Anbu to surrender at Kanchipuram district court to avoid being killed by the henchmen, but the FIR contains Anbu's name. Anbu takes responsibility for the murder and hopes to be released soon, but Kannan's henchmen hack Anbu to death and seriously wound Kaali outside the court. Kaali slides into a depression of guilt and swears revenge, attempting to kill Kannan. Afterwards, Kaali is berated for his bad temper by his parents and Maari, who want him to get his life back together. Maari assures Kaali that Anbu's death will be avenged. Kalairasi begins to comfort Kaali, and they spend time together and get married.

One day, Kaali and Kalaiarasi arrive at a restaurant, where he notices one of Maari's henchmen sitting at the nearby table. When he goes up to the henchman for a chat, the latter runs away in fear. After catching him, Kaali learns that Maari had joined hands with the opposing party to become MLA of RK Nagar and was the brain behind Anbu's assassination. Though reluctant, Kalaiarasi lets Kaali pursue his vengeance. At a local meeting where Maari is being felicitated, Kaali spills the beans, and the locals chase Maari out. Kaali splashes paint on the wall, thus ruining the portrait. Soon, everyone follows suit. Maari plots to kill Kaali but is betrayed by the touted successor of the opposing party. In a showdown, Kaali subdues the henchmen sent to kill him and grievously injures Maari, who is soon killed. Kaali and Kalaiarasi start teaching in the building whose wall was the cause of this bloody feud. The wall now has a theme of children's education painted on it. However, Kannan still wants to hang his father's portrait on the wall.

== Cast ==
- Karthi as Kaali
- Catherine Tresa as Kalaiarasi, Kaali's love-interest
- Kalaiyarasan as Anbu
- Riythvika as Mary, Anbu's wife
- Charles Vinoth as Maari
- V. I. S. Jayapalan as Krishnappan, Kannan's father
- Poster Nandakumar as Kannan
- Mime Gopi as Perumal, Kannan's son
- Rama as Kaali's mother
- Imman Annachi
- Jaya Rao as Kaali's father
- Hari Krishnan as Johnny
- Pavel Navageethan as Viji, a henchman
- Dinesh Mani as Dheena
- Lijeesh as Kaali's and Anbu's friend
- Gaana Bala as a funeral singer

== Production ==
=== Development ===
"The story traces the life of a young man living in the slums (from 1996 to 2014). It talks about how the poor are still looking for solutions to the same issues that have been plaguing them for a long time: poverty, powerlessness and so on. They are engaged by the parties to work for them during elections only to be forgotten afterwards. This is the crux of this film."

— Ranijth, describing the film, in an interaction with The Hindu.

Studio Green signed up Pa. Ranjith to direct a film for their production house after they had bought and distributed the director's successful venture, Attakathi (2012). In December 2012, Ranjith confirmed that he would shortly begin work on a project titled Sarpatta Parambarai with Karthi in the lead role, though production was subsequently delayed and did not take off as planned. In July 2013, it was announced that the pair would collaborate on a new script, with Santhosh Narayanan being signed on as composer, G Murali as cinematographer and Praveen K L as editor. Ranjith later clarified that Sarpatta Parambarai and Madras were two different scripts. Although the producers liked both scripts, Ranjith decided to shoot Madras first as Karthi had accidentally read the script and liked its concept and characters.

In an interview with The New Indian Express, Ranijth said that the film was not based on an individual and that Karthi's role was that of an IT graduate named Kaali, further adding that no make-up was used for any of the cast members. Ranjith also informed that some changes were made to the script to accommodate Karthi as the hero. Karthi said that he chose the script as he liked the way his character was portrayed in a realistic manner without making any commercial compromises. Ranjith later explained that it was a "film about Dalits and their way of life". Despite reports that the team had titled the film as Kabali or Kaali, the title Madras was announced in May 2014.

=== Casting ===
Sai Pallavi was the first choice of the female lead but she denied the offer to pursue her medical studies in Georgia. Later reports suggested that Nazriya Nazim would portray the role, while Nithya Menen and Lakshmi Menon were also linked to the role. Later in October 2013, Catherine Tresa was finalised to be the female lead in the film, thereby making her debut in Tamil films with the project. Catherine informed that she would play a "deglamourised" role in which her character was named Kalaiarasi, a bold and assertive woman. Mime artists 'Mime' Gopi and Hari Krishnan were cast in supporting roles; Harikrishnan who played a mentally challenged man named Johnny in the film said he lost 15 kilos for the role and added that it took him nine months to "let Johnny ‘occupy’ him".

Kalaiyarasan, who had a short role in Ranjith's first film, was given the pivotal role of Anbu, the protagonist's best friend, after he had cleared three screen tests. Riythvika of Paradesi (2013) fame, was paired opposite Kalaiarasan. Rama, who is known for her role in Bharathiraja's En Uyir Thozhan (1990), and Jaya Rao were chosen to play Karthi's parents. Apart from Karthi, all other actors were either debuting in Tamil cinema with Madras or had previously appeared in minor character roles, with Ranjith explaining that he selected newcomers and unpopular actors "to lend authenticity to the film".

=== Filming ===
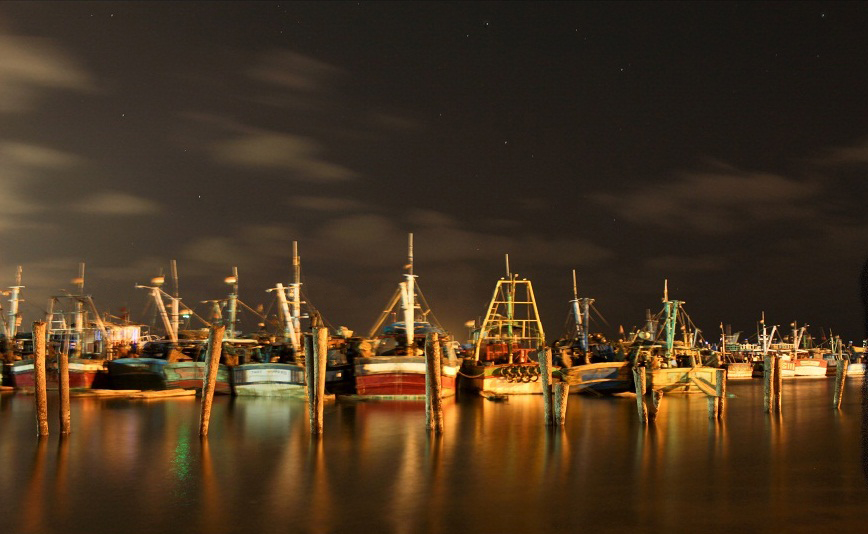
Royapuram Fishing Harbour. Most of the scenes in the film were shot at Royapuram, which is located in the north of Chennai.

Principal photography commenced on 11 October 2013 with a small puja ceremony at Vyasarpadi in Chennai. Karthi worked exclusively for the film in the final quarter of 2013, losing about 10 kg of weight and sporting a new look for the venture. Karthi also worked on acquiring the typical Royapuram accent and spent time in northern Chennai trying to learn about their way of life before the shooting began.

60% of the film was completed by mid-December 2013, with scenes shot extensively around Chennai. Two songs from the film were reported to have been completed, both of which were choreographed by Satish. The shooting of the climax of the film took place at Perambur in Chennai. Further portions of the climax sequences were canned in the Jamalia, Sathyamoorthy Nagar and Ram Nagar localities in the city.

Karthi, in an interview with India Today, said that the film would be a tribute to Chennai, whilst commemorating the 375th anniversary of the city's existence. Karthi also learnt to play football and carrom for the film as it was one of the sports that is popular in north Chennai. Catherine was given proper training in the style of Tamil spoken in Chennai and the background of people who live in North Chennai for her role. Filming wrapped by June 2014.

== Music ==
Pa. Ranjith renewed his association with Santhosh Narayanan for composing the film's soundtrack album and background score. (Note: Santhosh Narayanan and Pa. Ranjith had earlier worked together in Attakathi, which was the debut film for Ranjith as film director and for Santhosh Narayanan as music director.) The album consists of five songs with two theme music instrumental tracks all composed by Santhosh Narayanan. While Gana Bala penned the lyrics for the two songs sung by him, the remaining three were penned by Kabilan and Uma Devi. The soundtrack album was released on 27 June 2014. The song "Naan Nee" is featured in the 2026 Jio Hotstar series Resort.

== Release ==
The film was initially scheduled for a release in July 2014, thereby clashing with Velaiyilla Pattathari (2014). The release date was fixed as 25 July 2014. However, the release was postponed to 29 August 2014 and again to September 2014. The makers cited delay in censor certification as the main reason for the delay in release. On 5 September 2014, Karthi confirmed on his social networking page that the film would release on 26 September 2014. The film's censoring took place at the Four Frames theatre in Chennai on 11 September 2014. ATMUS Entertainment bought the North American distribution rights and released the film in 34 screens across the United States, while Dream Factory distributed the film across other countries worldwide, including India.

== Marketing ==
The film's first look was unveiled on 16 June 2014. The first look posters received positive feedback from fans and raised the film's expectations. Some even pointed out that the first look poster was similar to that of Vijay's first look poster from Thalaivaa (2013), but the makers clarified that only the background texture may have appeared to be similar and that Vijay's back was seen, whereas Karthi had a serious body language expression. The trailer of the film was uploaded to YouTube on 27 June 2014.

Short video clips of two of the film's songs "Aagayam Theepidicha" and "Naan Nee" were released on YouTube on 12 September 2014. Another official trailer released on 19 September 2014.

== Reception ==
=== Critical response ===
Madras received positive reviews from critics. Udhav Naig, writing for The Hindu said, "Rarely does one get to see a Tamil film that reflects the social reality so closely and sketching a detailed account of life that the middle and the upper middle class know little about. Full marks to Pa Ranjith for that". Another critic for The Hindu, Sudhir Srinivasan, gave a positive feedback regarding Karthi's performance and said, "Karthi, despite looking a bit too sophisticated for the grime of north Chennai, is a revelation with his dialogue delivery and body language. He is every bit the quintessential ‘local paiyan’". Writing for The New Indian Express, Malini Mannath said, "With an engaging screenplay, deft narration, well fleshed out characters and actors well cast, Madras captures the feel, flavour and ambiance of North Chennai with perfect precision". Sify said, "Madras works big time as writer and director Pa Ranjith has given priority to his script, which hooks the audiences straightaway. It is a triumph of honest writing and heartfelt dialogues. It is a gutsy and outstanding film". M Suganth of The Times of India gave 4 out of 5 stars and said, "[...] Ranjith keeps defying our expectations in subtle ways. We think we know what the outcome of a scene would be but he constantly surprises us with how the scene is executed". Haricharan Pudipeddi of IANS gave 4 stars out of 5 and wrote, "Very few filmmakers can turn an ordinary tale of politics, friendship and revenge into a masterpiece. Ranjith is one such filmmaker and his Madras is probably the best audiences can get from Tamil cinema this year".

S Sarawathi of Rediff gave 3.5 out of 5 and wrote, "The innovative script, well-etched characters and the commendable performances, strengthened by a brilliant technical team and perfect execution, make Madras one of the best films this year". Anupama Subramanian of the Deccan Chronicle rated the film 3.5 out of 5 and stated, "Madras has a strong storyline and a powerful cast to back this up. The major success of the film is attributed to the perfect casting handpicked by Ranjith and extracting the best from them", going on to call it "a not to be missed film". In contrast, Gautaman Bhaskaran of the Hindustan Times gave a rating of 1.5 out of 5 stars and stated, "In the end, Madras is but another work about gang wars and political rivalry that can only be watched if you stop disbelieving".

=== Box office ===
Madras collected ₹4.5 crore (US$470,000) in the US, ₹1.74 crore (US$180,000) in the United Kingdom and ₹708 lakh (US$740,000) in Malaysia in the first 3 days of its overseas theatrical run.
