= Thirumurugan =

Thirumurugan is one of the names of Hindu god Kartikeya and may refer to

- Thirumurugan (actor), Indian actor in Tamil cinema
- Thirumurugan (director), Indian director of Tamil films and television
- Thirumurugan Gandhi, Indian activist
- Thirumurugan Veeran (born 1983), Malaysian footballer
- Thirumuruganpoondi, Tirupur District, Tamil Nadu, India
  - Thirumuruganatheeswar Temple, in Thirumuruganpoondi
