= 2018 Thoothukudi protest shooting =

22 May 2018 incident in the Thoothukudi district of India

- Thoothukudi in Tamil Nadu
- Location: 8.784117°N 78.099142°E; Thoothukudi, Tamil Nadu, India
- Date: 22 May 2018 (UTC +5:30)
- Target: Protestors against Sterlite Copper
- Attack type: Shooting
- Weapon: L1A1 SLR battle rifle
- Deaths: 14
- Injuries: 102
- Perpetrators: Tamil Nadu Police & Paramilitary forces

The 2018 Thoothukudi protest shooting (also known as the Thoothukudi massacre, the Thoothukudi police firing, the Anti Sterlite protest firing and so on) denotes events that took place on 22 and 23 May 2018 in Thoothukudi, Tamil Nadu, India. The shooting took place during an ongoing protest against proposed expansion of a copper smelter plant run by Sterlite Corporation in Thoothukudi town. Police opened fire on the protesters, killed 13 people and left 102 injured. Several policemen were also injured during the protests.

On 22 May morning, the 100th day of the anti-Sterlite protests, thousands of people marched towards the Thoothukudi Collectorate, against legal prohibitory orders passed by the district administration. The agitated protesters overpowered police, started pelting stones and torched vehicles. Police opened fire killing 12 persons on 22 May, at various places in Thoothukudi Town and as the protest continued, one more person was shot dead on 23 May. In a related incident, a woman was killed when miscreants, during Anti Sterlite protests torched a bus on 25 May at Srivaikuntam. Another man died after 5 months of being in coma in October 2018, after getting injured in lathi-charge by police.

The Central Bureau of Investigation (CBI) in November 2018, registered cases on several unidentified police personnel and revenue department officials of Tamil Nadu for the death of the 14 protesters, including cases of criminal intimidation and criminal conspiracy. The United nations condemned the firing by the police as excessive and disproportionate. On 19 August 2022, The Justice Aruna Jagadeesan Commission of Inquiry recommended Tamil Nadu government to take action against top police officials for “excessive lethal force” by police on the protestors.

== Background ==
Sterlite Copper has been facing resistance from the local fishermen's groups in the area ever since the plant was given permission to be established by the Tamil Nadu Pollution Control Board in 1994. Sporadic protests have occurred in Thoothukudi since 1999, directed against the Sterlite Copper smelting works, the factory owned by Vedanta Limited, a subsidiary of Vedanta Resources. Protesters opposed the soil, water and air contamination caused by the factory.

=== Pollution studies ===
An epidemiological study carried out by Tirunelveli Medical College in 2006–07 found an increased prevalence of respiratory diseases and ear, nose and throat (ENT) morbidity in the 5-km radius of Sterlite Industries. The study reported the prevalence of respiratory diseases in the area at 13.9% which was far higher than the state average. The prevalence of asthmatic bronchitis is 2.8%, which more than two-times the state average of 1.29%. Myalgia (general body pain) is another extensively reported symptom and women were often found to have menstrual disorders, like menorrhagiae and dysmenorrhagiae in the area. Their report blamed it on the air pollution caused by the industry's thermal power plants and automobiles in the area. The groundwater iron content in the area of the plant has been found to be 17–20 times the allowable limit, causing additional health problems for the population already experiencing higher than average incidence of respiratory diseases. During the time of this study in 2007, Sterlite was operating at about 18 to 42 percent, compared to its 4 Lakh Tonnes per Annum in the year 2017–2018.

The 1998 report by National Environmental Engineering Research Institute (NEERI), the levels of selenium, arsenic and lead in treated effluent were higher than specified standards. The team also found dead birds after they consumed the water mixed with the effluent and also reported that the industry's process of cooling the effluents can cause health hazards to the staff and residents in the local region. In another instance, the NEERI reported water samples from dugwells and borewells around the spot were found to be non-drinkable due to its high chemical content. During 1998, the industry was operating at 10% capacity, compared to that of 2018.

In a 2005 environmental audit by NEERI, the samples from a village 2-km northwest of the factory had levels of cadmium, copper, lead, chromium, and arsenic 2 to 9 times higher than allowed levels. Soil Samples were also analyzed in areas surrounding the plant during the study and arsenic levels ranged from 133 mg/kg to 287 mg/kg, where soils containing more than 50 mg/kg of arsenic are supposed to treated as a 'hazardous wastes' under the Indian Law.

In October 2010, sampling tests by an NGO, Community Environmental Monitoring, found salinity level in an open well to be of 7854 mg/litre while levels exceeding 2000 mg/litre can badly damage the crops. Another water sample from a bore-well had sulfate levels 10 times higher than the average. A soil sample from the same spot contained 335 g/kg of iron and an ingestion of just 3.5 grams by a child can be a serious case of iron poisoning.

A scientific study in 2017, found most of the ground water samples in the area are highly contaminated with heavy metals like arsenic, lead, boron etc. which were higher than the World Health Organization's prescribed limit.

The Tamil Nadu Pollution Control Board (TNPCB) observed that the unit has been releasing poisonous gas in the air. TNPCB identified that the sulphur dioxide levels went off the scale on the night of 23 March 2013. It showed a reading of 2939.55-mg/cubic meter against the decreed limit of 1250 mg/cubic meter.

On 9 April 2018, the TNPCB accused the Sterlite Copper of causing groundwater pollution.

=== Gas leaks ===
On 6 July 1997, the Tamil Nadu Pollution Control Board told the company to shut down after a sulphur dioxide gas leak which hospitalized more than 90 people.

The Sterlite Copper factory also made headlines in 2013 after a suspected sulphur dioxide gas leak from one of its smelter. The plant was blamed for health issues observed in the area related to gas leakage and residents near-by complained of coughing, wheezing, eye irritation, and miscarriages following the leak. Following the alleged gas leak in March 2013, the then chief minister, the late J. Jayalalithaa, ordered its closure. The company appealed to the National Green Tribunal, which overturned the government order. The state moved the Supreme Court against it, where the petition was still pending. The plant closed on 27 March 2018, with the company citing a 15-day maintenance process. The Supreme Court ordered the company to pay a 100-crore fine for polluting the water, air and soil around the plant and the factory was temporarily shutdown by the pollution regulator. About 150 people were arrested in protests against the plant.

In June 2019, the Tamil Nadu government reported that there were 84 incidents of gas leaks at Sterlite Copper in the year 2013 alone, to the Madras High Court.

== Protests in 2018 ==
The wave of protests started when Sterlite's plan to increase the capacity from 400000 tonne to 800000 tonnes per year. In corporate statements, Sterlite has said it would make the plant "one of the world's largest single-location copper smelting complexes". Residents started calling for an indefinite dharna and hunger strike on 12 February and over 250 people started an indefinite hunger strike. Over 500 people, including many women and schoolchildren, blocked the company gates until they were rounded up and arrested on 14 February 2018.Since then protests have been ongoing, day and night.

On 24 March of thousands of protesters gathered in Thoothukudi town to demand closure of the plant, which was supported by the traders of the town by shutting down the shops. Media reports suggests that this was comparable to the 2017 pro-jallikattu protests and Thoothukudi protest has shaken the state. The Sterlite management responded by stating that they have got necessary permission for expansion of the plant. Actor turned politician Kamal Haasan visited Kumarareddiapuram village in support of the protest on 1 April. Meanwhile, the plant was shut for 15 days for taking up maintenance works on 29 March. The protesters claimed that the company went on to expand despite the rejection by the government. The protests were joined by traders of Thoothukudi city central trade association on the same day following calls for a bandh by coordinator of the protest M Krishnamoorthi. It is also reported that section of the traders and lorry owners association did not participate in the 24 March protest. According to media reports police sources confirmed the company's allegation that 'external forces' instigating agitations. One of the company representative D. Dhanavel rubbished the agitation as "false propaganda" and said the smelting plant maintained "very low" emission level. Vaiko has sought an injunction against the functioning and extension of the copper smelting plant, in the Madurai Bench of High Court of Madras. A division bench of the Court sought a counter be filed for the existing unit and posted the case for further hearing on 7 June. Meanwhile, Sterlite moved the Madras High Court for passing prohibitory orders under IPC section 144, as it feared the protest to be organised on 22 May may turn violent. The petitioner alleged that there was a plan to unleash violence and even "burn down the factory", and said the regulatory order banning assembly of four or more persons could prevent such incidents. By 11 May, various organizations protesting against the plant had joined and formed Thoothukudi District Anti-Sterlite Forum and planned to mark the 100th day of the ongoing round of protest.

The original plan of the protestors was to storm the Collectorate, district administration called 23 people belonging to the trader associations and anti-sterlite activists from the protesters including the environmental activist Fatima Babu on 20 May for a peace meeting. The members agreed to shift the venue after pressure from the government, from the Collector's Office to SAV ground and to convert the protest as ‘attention seeking protest’. Fatima was soon expelled by the protesting group after she agreed to the shift. The members present in the meeting said they agreed, but the activists pointed out that it was impossible to communicate this shift of venue to people inside the district and out of the district, as there already had been an aggressive campaign for the protest notifying its venue as Collectorate.

Two groups of people protested separately on 22 May. One of them was protesting an attention-seeking protest at SAV ground and the other was marching towards the Collector's office. Soon both the groups joined and marched toward the Collector's office. Police resorted to lathi charge and fired tear gas shells at the crowd after disagreeing with the protesters who wanted to stage a sit-in. There were about 2000 police personnel and a crowd of over 20,000 protesters. The district administration played down the intelligence reports of mass mobilization of over 18,000 people in the district, assuming that expulsion of Fatima and imposition of Section 144 would de-escalate the protest.

An employee of the Sterlite Copper claimed the involvement of groups like Makkal Athikaram and Foil Vedanta in the protests.

== Rally and Police firing on 22 May ==
On 22 May morning the people from coastal area started marching to the collector's office from the Our Lady of Snows church around 10 am. Police tried to stop the crowd at the church, but the crowd were determined to march. Meanwhile, police had barricaded roads near the villages close to Sterlite, and as a result, a majority of the original protestors — villagers from Kumareddiyapuram and its neighbouring areas — could not reach the protest site at all. An argument started between the police and the protesters in front of the first barricade after some protesters asked them why they were siding with the Sterlite, the police started to lathi Charge against the people after seeing that they were uncompromising.

Another section of protesters, joined the attention seeking protest at the SAV ground, but later joined the rally for besieging the collector's office by seeing the larger crowd in it. At VVD traffic signal, a four-road junction in the Tamizh Salai, about 6 km from the Collectors office, police stopped them with barricades. The crowd was about 5000–10000 as per various sources. The police started lathi charging, but the crowd proceeded to Collectors office. Several protesters said that the police let loose two huge bulls at the protesters in an attempt to disperse the protesters. Following the lathi Charge by police, the crowd pelted stones and hurled footwears at the police who were wearing protective gears. One police van was pushed down, when the police retreated. Police tried another attempt to stop the crowd near Third Mile bridge on the Palayamkottai road, and tear gas was used to quell the rioting mob, which continued to regroup. An explosive substance was thrown at the police. The mob torched two police vehicles near P&T Colony and torched few bikes stationed beneath the bridge connecting Thoothukudi-Madurai national highways.

By the time the mob reached the Collector's office, the size was about 20,000. The mob continued entering to Collector Office Campus despite attempts of Police to stop them.

The police started shooting against the protesters, "without any formal warning" after tear gas and lathi charge proved ineffective.

The police wearing plainclothes, started shooting at the protesters and were also accused of shooting without any formal warning. Police were also reported of intentionally shooting at the heads of the protesters with long range rifle standing on the top of a van. 13 protesters were killed including a 17-year-old school student, and dozens were injured. Another man injured in lathi-charge by the police died in October 2018, after being in coma for five months. Thus, taking total death toll increased to 14.

FIRs filed in local police stations, claimed that the order to shoot was issued by officers in the rank of deputy Tehsildars and people pointed out that only collectors have the authority to issue shooting orders.

The Tamil Nadu government ordered a shutdown of Internet in the entire districts of Tuticorin, Tirunelveli and Kanyakumari for five days after the firing.

== Investigations ==
=== Autopsy results ===
The Autopsy results revealed that 12 of the 13 members killed during the protests got hit by bullets in their head or chest while half of those died were shot from behind. In the case of a young girl, the bullet entered through the back of her head and exited through her mouth. While the police rules allowed them to use live bullets to stop protests, the gun should be aimed below the waist level and policemen should not shoot to kill. A video shot from the proximity of the policemen during the protests shows a policeman aiming at protesters from atop of a van with a gun and a voice in the background can be heard saying, "At least one must die."

=== Central Bureau of Investigation ===
In November 2018, the CBI filed cases against police personnel and revenue department officials in Tamil Nadu for the death of the thirteen people killed during the protests. The CBI charged the accused with criminal intimidation, criminal conspiracy and disobeying law with the intention to cause injury to people. This comes after the several environmental activists questioned the National Green Tribunal's appointed panel which said that the state government's action to close the plant after protests was illegal.

In December 2023, the Chief Judicial Magistrate of Madurai court rejected the CBI's chargesheet and ordered further investigation within next six months. The criticized CBI's report unfairly blamed only one police officer and omitted other responsible officials. The court found the CBI's investigation incomplete and its final report defective.

In June 2024, the CBI informed the Madras High Court that it had completed a further investigation and filed an additional report before the Chief Judicial Magistrate, Madurai. This followed the earlier rejection of the CBI's chargesheet that named only one police officer.

In July 2024, the Madras High Court observed that the CBI appeared to have lost its independence and failed to effectively identify all those responsible for the firing. Justices S.S. Sundar and N. Senthilkumar noted that the CBI's chargesheet naming only one officer showed “serious lapses” and a lack of credibility, and that the agency had overlooked key findings of the Justice Aruna Jagadeesan Commission of Inquiry, which examined the incident.

== Government response ==
On 24 May 2018, then Chief Minister of Tamil Nadu, Edappadi K. Palaniswami(EPS), stated that anti-social elements and miscreants were responsible for instigating the unrest, claiming that they had infiltrated the protests and incited violence. He asserted that the police had arrested only those involved in violent activities and not members of the general public. Palaniswami also said that he came to know about the police firing only through media reports and television news, a statement that drew public criticism and controversy. Later, according to the Justice Aruna Jagadeesan Commission of Inquiry submitted in the year 2022, it was observed then Chief Minister EPS was being updated minute by minute on the developments of police firing.

The opposition leader in the Tamil Nadu Legislative Assembly, Dravida Munnetra Kazhagam (DMK) working president and M. K. Stalin, staged a sit-in protest on 24 May 2018, outside the Tamil Nadu Secretariat, criticizing the state government for failing to take action against those responsible. He and several other party leaders were subsequently detained by the police. Stalin also visited the Thoothukudi Government Hospital to meet those injured in the incident. The DMK, along with its allied parties, organized a state-wide bandh on 25 May 2018 to condemn the police firing, demand the resignation of Chief Minister EPS, and call for the permanent closure of Vedanta's Sterlite Copper plant.

On 28 May 2018, the Sterlite factory was sealed after an order given by the Tamil Nadu Environmental pollution and Forests Department. The next day, State Industries Promotion Corporation of Tamil Nadu (SIPCOT) announced that it would take back 342.22 acres of land that it had given for expansion of the facility. Many political leaders including M.K.Stalin, Seeman and Anbumani Ramadoss criticized the sealing order, saying that it would not stand up to legal scrutiny since the government had given no reason for shutting down the factory.

== Reactions ==
- Indian National Congress party president Rahul Gandhi described it as "state-sponsored terrorism". Rahul Gandhi also tweeted that Tamils were killed because they refused to acknowledge the philosophy of the Rashtriya Swayamsevak Sangh (RSS) and bullets of RSS and Modi can't crush the Tamil people's spirits.
- Human Rights experts from the United Nations condemned the use of lethal force by the police against protesters who were marching against problems of legitimate environmental and human rights and said the firing was excessive and disproportionate.
- Seeman condemned the firing, and his political party held a rally in Tirunelveli condemning the shooting.
- Kamal Haasan was one of the first political leaders to arrive to Tuticorin to see the injured in the hospital, after the shootings. He said he saw about 20 people in the Thoothukudi government hospital with gunshot wounds on their upper bodies, indicating that they had been shot from a long distance. He also said that the police were aiming for the shoulder and the gut.
- Vijay visited the families of those who were killed in the protests. He also gave every family a solatium of ₹1 lakh.
- Vaiko and M.K.Stalin demanded investigations into the shootings. Stalin also criticized the Government of India, led by the Bharatiya Janata Party (BJP), stating that Prime Minister Narendra Modi had not made any statement regarding the police firing.
- Thirumurugan Gandhi, the coordinator of May 17 Movement, took the issue to the 38th session of the United Nations Human Rights Council (UNHRC), Geneva in July 2018. On 9 August 2018, Thirumurugan Gandhi was detained by immigration authorities at Bangalore Airport on his return to India and charged for speaking about the Thoothukudi firings at the UNHRC. Court, later, refused to remand him under judicial custody as it found the charges are baseless.
- National Human Rights Commission of India demanded investigation into the killings. It asked its Director General (Investigation) to send a team headed by an SP to visit the spot and conduct an inquiry.
- Tamils and Tamil diaspora across the world including United States, Canada, Malaysia, Singapore, Sri Lanka, Australia and Europe held various kinds of protests against the killing.
- The opposition party of the United Kingdom, the Labour Party, called for Vedanta to be removed from the London Stock Exchange. The UK's shadow chancellor, John McDonnell, said taking away Vedanta Resources out from London financial markets would deter reputational harm from the "rogue" firm that has been functioning "illegal" mining issues for years. McDonnell said in a statement, "After the firing on the protestors this week, regulators must now take action. Vedanta must be immediately delisted from the London Stock Exchange to remove its cloak of respectability, restore confidence in the governance of the Stock Exchange, and prevent further reputational damage to London's financial markets from this rogue corporation".
- Actor Rajinikanth said, "The entire problem started after anti-social elements attacked police and burned down collector's office, as a result, peaceful protestors were killed. If you undertake protest for each and everything, Tamil Nadu will be turned into a cemetery". His reaction to the firing was criticized on the social media. Following his controversial statements regarding the Thoothukudi police firing, the Tamil activist groups in Norway and Switzerland banned the release of Rajinikanth's film Kaala in Norway and Switzerland by the scheduled worldwide release date as of 7 June. The Tamil diaspora groups in Norway and Switzerland announced that they would not release the films of actors in the future who deliberately hurt the feelings and attitudes of Tamil people following the comments from Rajinikanth on Tamils. However, the ban was later lifted and the film was released within a week, a day before the scheduled worldwide release in Switzerland and Norway. The actor was also summoned to appear before the one man commission probing the incident on 25 February. However, the actor cited professional engagements and disturbance caused to the public if a star of his stature arrives at the court to decline appearing before the commission.

== Controversy ==
=== Disappearance of S. Mugilan ===
On 15 February 2019, Shanmugam Thangasamy, an environmental activist better known as S. Mugilan, held a press conference in Chennai where he claimed that the senior Police officials in Tamil Nadu conspired with the officials of the Sterlite copper to carry out the gun shooting which killed 13 people, during the meeting he also voiced his fear that "his life is in danger" after releasing the video evidence. Separately, in a press release, he accused the police of burning vehicles and vilifying anti-Sterlite protesters. He also went missing on the same day in a train while travelling from Chennai to Madurai. A week ago, he released the video titled ‘Sterlite: Hidden Truth’ where he accused two senior police officers and the Officials of the Sterlite for plotting the attacks. The two police officers he named were transferred out of the area by June 2018. The Amnesty International India reported that Mugilan had a history of fighting against sand mining mafias and polluting factories. After 100 days after his disappearance his wife alleged of constant harassment by the CB-CID. In July 2019, Mugilan was found after missing for 5 months in a railway station at Tirupathi where he was arrested by the police and handed over to the CB-CID.

On 2 March, a demonstration was held in Chennai, demanding that an activist be found urgently, by the Dravida Munnetra Kazhagam, Marumalarchi Dravida Munnetra Kazhagam, Viduthalai Chiruthaigal Katchi, and the Communist Party of India.

On 12 November 2019, Mugilan was brought for a one-man commission for questioning regarding the Thoothukudi incident. He said that he was kidnapped from the railway station and the abductors threatened him to stop working against the sterlite and showed him a newspaper clipping which mention his wife and son had died in a road accident. He claimed they also threatened to embarrass him in public, injected him with drugs to keep him unconscious and left him in a village in Jharkhand where a nomadic group helped him recover and he wandered with the nomads for 2 months devastated with the fake news about his family before reaching Tirupathi. He also claimed he was not allowed to speak his claims before the Judicial Magistrate in Karur. The Madras High court dismissed his affidavit as a fabricated story. He also demanded the commission to investigate Rahul Gandhi for linking the Rashtriya Swayamsevak Sangh (RSS) with the firing incident.

=== 5 Day Blackout in Thoothukudi ===
In both Thoothukudi and Tirunelveli there was a 5-day suspension of internet services meaning one cannot use the internet using their devices. The AIADMK government has said this suspension was done to stop rumors but some human right bodies say this prevented civilians from uploading videos or photos of the issue and was a restriction on freedom of speech.

== Aftermath ==
On 28 October 2018, the Tamil Nadu Pollution Control Board reported that the sulphur-dioxide levels in the air had reduced significantly after the Sterlite plant's closure.

In November 2019, the Tamil Nadu Pollution Control Board reported that the ambient air quality had improved dramatically after the closure of the plant.

On 27 April 2021, the Supreme Court of India allowed Vedanta Limited to operate its oxygen production unit at its Sterlite Copper premises in Thoothukudi in order to meet the national demand for oxygen for the COVID-19 affected patients. The order will hold ground until 31 July 2021.

Justice Aruna Jagadeesan Commission of Inquiry (CoI) submitted the report in August 2022. “Does it deserve a comment that it is a dastardly act, the Commission is left to wonder,” said Aruna Jagadeesan, the Chairman of the CoI, in her final report. She has also stated that the firing was “unprovoked”, the police “had fired on the fleeing protesters...”. It further says: “Here is a case of police indulging in shooting from their hide-outs at the protesters who were far away from them.” The report has singled out the then District Collector N. Venkatesh (now with the National Fisheries Development Board, Hyderabad) for his “abdication of responsibility, gross negligence and ill-conceived decisions”. In the report, she stated that then Chief Minister EPS did not take adequate measures to defuse the situation in Thoothukudi before it escalated on 22 May 2018. The report also noted that intelligence inputs submitted prior to the incident were not acted upon, that no effective steps were taken to address public concerns, and that the district administration's inaction and disregard of police inputs contributed to the violence.

Sudalaikannu According to the panel, he was the only cop who could be found “willingly and exuberantly” everywhere across the town on May 22, carrying a long-range Self Loading Rifle (SLR). He opened 17 rounds of fire at the collectorate, Third Mile, Food Corporation of India (FCI) Roundtana, and Thereshpuram, where many were killed.

May 23, when SP Mahendran went to Anna Nagar, he faced the fury of a crowd of youths protesting the deaths in police firing the previous day. In the stone-throwing that followed, a police officer sustained a bleeding injury in his left leg. Instead of handling the situation sensitively, the SP “took away the pistol from his gunman Stalin” and opened nine rounds of fire, which resulted in the death of a 25-year-old youth and caused serious injuries to a few others.

== See also ==
- Manjolai Riots
- 2018 Tamil Nadu protests for Kaveri water sharing
- Custodial death of P Jayaraj and Bennicks
