= Violence against women in Tamil Nadu =

Public health issue of violent acts against women

Violence against women in Tamil Nadu includes molestation, abduction, dowry-related violence, and domestic violence. The police recorded 1,130 cases during the first seven months in 2013, compared to 860 for the corresponding period in 2012. In Usilampatti Taluk, around 6,000 female children were killed in a span of 2 years during 1987–88, accounting to the single largest instance of recorded female infanticide.

A major underlying cause of violence against women is the perception that married women are the property of their husbands. Alcohol use and the portrayal of women in the society and cinemas as sex objects are also believed to be major factors.

Tamil Nadu is the first Indian state to set up "all women police stations" to deal with crimes against women. After the 2012 Delhi gang rape case in 2013, in which a girl was gang-raped in a moving bus, leading to her death, the Tamil Nadu government unveiled a 13-point action plan including installation of closed-circuit television (CCTV) in all public buildings and booking offenders in Goondas Act of 1982, that gives non-bailable retention up to 1 year.

== Violence ==
The categories of violence against women reported in Tamil Nadu crime statistics are rape, dowry death, molestation, abduction, sexual harassment, and physical abuse by husband and his relatives. During the period of January to July 2013, the state police registered 1,130 cases compared to 860 during the corresponding period in 2012. The number of rape cases in the state were 436 during the same period, comprising 42 in Chennai, 32 in Villupuram and 11 in Coimbatore. The police also reported a decrease in the rape and abduction cases and an increase of 32 per cent cases related to cruelty by husbands and relatives. As per the crime report of Tamil Nadu Police in 2007, a total of 6,612 cases relating to crime against women were registered by the police, which was 39 per cent over the number in 2006. Of these, cruelty by husband and relatives and molestation accounted for 53 per cent of the cases. The corresponding Acts under which cases were filed include Indecent Representation of women Act, Child Marriage Restraint Act, Tamil Nadu Prohibition of Harassment of Women (Amended) Act 2002, Tamil Nadu Prohibition of Sexual harassment of Women Act 2000, and Dowry Prohibition Act. The sections under the Indian Penal Code related to women are IPC 376 for Rape, IPC 363 -373 related to account Kidnapping & Abduction, 302/304-B related to Homicide for Dowry, Dowry Deaths or their attempts, 498-A related to Cruelty by husband or Relatives, 354 elated to Molestation, 509 related to Sexual Harassment, 366-B related to Importation of Girls up to 21 years. In 2007, the state police filed 523 (7.91%) cases of rape, 718 (16.59%) related to kidnapping and abduction, 187 (3.15%) dowry deaths, 1,247 (29.89%) related to cruelty by husbands and relatives, 1,179 (23.29%) related to molestation, 852 (13.23%) on sexual harassment, 35 (0.38%) on indecent representation of women and 81 (5.57%) related to dowry prohibition. Among districts, Chennai recorded the maximum of 705 cases while Nilgiris district was the lowest with 40 cases. The victims in the age group 19–30 years was the maximum, accounting for 62.41%, followed by age group 15–18 years at 19.36% and 11–14 years at 7.71%.

== Major forms of violence ==
Crimes
Year	Rape	Dowry deaths
2003	557	220
2004	618	225
2005	571	215
2006	457	187
2007	523	208

=== Dowry death ===
Dowry death, also known as "bride burning", is a crime related to the dowry system in India, which is the practise of the bride's family giving gifts to the family of the groom. The practise is believed to have originated in Hindu marriage customs, but in many cases in modern times is visualised as a business transaction negotiated between the families of the bride and groom. Dowry harassment and dowry death occur in situations in which the groom's family becomes dissatisfied with the dowry or with delays in receiving it, then reacts by humiliating the bride and subjecting her to physical abuse. In India, most family disputes that result in violence are disputes over dowry transactions. According to Indian Penal Code (IPC) 304B, if a woman dies during the first seven years of marriage from burns, bodily injury or other "unnatural circumstance", authorities are required to investigate the possibility of dowry harassment. If the death is determined to be a dowry death, the victim's husband and in-laws can be held liable. If a dying woman testifies to a magistrate regarding the cause of her injuries, her testimony can be used for prosecution. The nation recorded 12,612 dowry deaths during the years of 1998 and 1999. Tamil Nadu reported 198 dowry-related deaths during 2008. Dowry deaths, like other crimes against women, are believed to be under-reported; many cases of burns or other injuries that are recorded as accidents may actually be due to dowry harassment. Few cases of dowry death result in punishment for the perpetrators. As of January 2009, there had been only one conviction resulting from Tamil Nadu's 198 dowry-death cases in 2008 and there were no convictions for the 208 cases in 2007.

=== Female infanticide ===
Female infanticide was more common during the 1980s in the southern districts of Tamil Nadu. In Usilampatti taluk, a taluk in Madurai District, around 6,000 female children were killed in a span of 2 years during 1987–88. The crime was detected in one of the maternity homes that reported loss of 95% female children born during the period. The female infants were fed with the poisonous juice of oleander plant almost on the day of the birth of the child. The practice was reported even during 1993. The other districts which had prevalence were Salem, Dharmapuri, Vellore (formerly North Arcot), Erode, Dindigul and Madurai, with North Salem, South Dharmapuri, South Dindigul and West Madurai accounting for 70 per cent of all cases. While the practice was initially considered to be prevalent in the lower sections of Thevar and Nadar community, it was found out with other castes like Gounder, Vanniyar, Pallar and Paraiyar. The people considered marrying the girl in the future a menace on account of their financial constraints. The then government headed by Jayalalithaa launched a cradle baby scheme in 1992 in Salem district that urged the parents to drop the child in the cradles instead of killing them. There were educational programmes launched by the child health and welfare department of the state to create awareness. Dharmapuri district recorded as many as 1,002 registered cases of infanticide, the highest in the state during the year and it reduced to one during 2012. During the simultaneous period, the cradles baby scheme had 1,338 children having 1,272 girls. The government also launched another campaign in which the parents of girls undergoing sterilisation were compensated and a gold ring was presented to the girl on her 20th birthday to ease her marriage expenses.

=== Trafficking ===
The Immoral Traffic (Prevention) Act, 1956 (ITPA) imposes prevention of trafficking women and children. While it was initially targeted at sex workers with a female majority, it was gradually extended to trafficking of human beings. The Tamil Nadu police created an Anti-Trafficking Cell in the Crime Branch CID, that has inter-state connectivity to deal with trafficking. During 2007, 1,199 cases were registered in the state related to trafficking, with a majority against pimps, brothel owners and traffickers. The state capital, Chennai had the highest in 2007 with 202 cases followed by Coimbatore with 143, Coimbatore district with 107 and Trichy with 100 cases. Tamil Nadu recorded the highest number of domestic violence cases against women in 2011 with 3,983 cases, out of the national total of 9,431. A survey conducted by World Health Organization across different states in 2005-06 indicated that the crime against women in the state was at 41.9 per cent, with most incidents reported in urban locations than in rural. In one of the publicised rescue operations in 1990, 913 females were rescued from brothels in Mumbai and the state promised a rehabilitation for all of them. But a few months later, all of them returned to the brothels as their families abandoned them and the government relief measures did not reach them.

=== Acid attack ===
Acid attacks involve throwing acid to dismember or mutilate women. As per a report published on the attacks between March 2014 to September 2015, 200 attacks were recorded, 70.2% were on women. The major reason cited for 51% of the cases involved disgruntled persons who were denied love by the women involved and 42% were attacked by anonymous persons. The state had three fatalities during the period of 2012–14.

== Causes ==
An analysis by the government of Tamil Nadu states that a major underlying cause of violence against women is the perception that married women are the property of their husbands. Within this cultural context, suspicions of infidelity, alcoholism, antagonism over dowries, a couple's infertility, and instigation by a man's relatives can lead to episodes of violence against women. Violence in films and media portrayals of women as sex objects are also cited as contributing to violence against women. In Tamil Nadu's patriarchal society, women sometimes have been punished by men for not producing a male heir. The political party Marumalarchi Dravida Munnetra Kazhagam and social activists, including Tamilaruvi Manian and Sasi Perumal, have named alcohol use as a major cause of rape and other forms of violence against women in Tamil Nadu and have cited this as one reason for calling for reinstatement of prohibition in Tamil Nadu. In rural scenario, Dalit women, the lower caste in the society, faced the triple burden of caste, class and gender. Dalit women were forced into prostitution to their higher caste landlords. The police were also reported to target and torture the lower caste women to punish their male relatives. As per the Home Department of Tamil Nadu, out of 1,747 women homicides committed in the state in 2011, 440 were accounted to family quarrels, 325 to wordy quarrel, 421 to personal enmity and 347 to love and sexual causes.

== Situation in other states ==
As per the crime report released by the National Crime Records Bureau, Tamil Nadu ranked 13th during 2012 among all the states in India. The state registered 7,192 cases against that of Karnataka having 10,336 cases, Andhra Pradesh having 28,171 cases and West Bengal with 30,942 cases. But the state ranked first in terms of human trafficking, where 500 cases were registered, which was 19.5 per cent over the previous year. The then Madhya Pradesh Home minister Babu Lal Gaur, who visited Chennai on 11 January 2014 stated that the crime in the city is less compared to that of Bhopal as the women in Chennai dress fully and go to temples regularly. The comment drew lot of controversy as the opposition claimed that he entirely vouched for the anti-socials by taking a religious stand. The number of cases involving domestic violence was maximum in Tamil Nadu in 2013 with 3,983 registered cases, out of the total 9,431 registered cases. Gujarat and West Bengal were next only Tamil Nadu with 3,266 and 1,661 registered cases.

== Awareness ==
Crime against women

"We will strictly implement the requirement of installing CCTV in key public places and buildings as it enables surveillance of sexual harassment against women and catching the culprits."

— ~ J Jayalalithaa, Chief Minister of Tamil Nadu,More crime against women in Tamil Nadu, 23 February 2013

Tamil Nadu is the first state in India to set up "all women police stations" (AWPSs) to deal with crimes against women. The scheme was initiated by the then-chief minister of the state, J Jayalalithaa, during her first tenure in 1991–95. As of 2003, the state had around 188 AWPSs all over the state, most of which were located in the same building as the regular police station. The AWPSs were set to handle cases related to women like sexual harassment, marital discord, child abuse, eve teasing, trafficking, suicides and dowry harassment. Activists believed that after the establishment of AWPSs, women were able to come out and report dowry-related crimes freely to the police women. The police women also reported that they received complaints related to sex tortures, which otherwise went unreported to their male counterparts.

There is a wide consensus across the world that crime against women is often under-reported. It is also reported that every twenty minutes, a woman is sexually assaulted. Some sections believe that there is a skew in the reported crime data against women. The Tamil Nadu police have reported that the awareness among women has improved and they were less afraid to file complaints. The 2012 Delhi gang rape case in 2013, where a girl was gang-raped in a moving bus leading to her fatal death, was reported to have increased the awareness. Activists in that state have reported that the police who were earlier not registering such cases, have started registering them. The Chief Minister of the State, J Jayalalithaa, announced in the assembly that a 13-point action plan was unveiled by the government post the Delhi Gang Rape like installation of Closed Circuit Television (CCTV) in all public buildings and booking offenders in Goondas Act of 1982, that provides for non-bailable retention up to one year. The government ruled that educational institutions, hospitals, cinema theatres, banks, ATM counters, shopping malls, petrol bunks and jewellery shops would be covered under the Tamil Nadu Urban Local Bodies (Installation of Closed Circuit TV Units in Public Buildings) Rules, 2012. It also ruled that state and central government offices with 100 employees or more and having an area of 500 square metres (0.12 acres) or more would be covered under the rule. The rule also stipulated a time period of six months for the installation in existing buildings, failing which, the licenses would remain cancelled or suspended. During 2013, the state government also launched a 24*7 women's helpline monitored by senior police officials. The government also ordered speedy investigation in all the pending cases related to crime against women and setting up of fast track district courts to speed justice. The state also proposed to the centre to modify existing rules to render heavy punishments to the offenders to the tune of death and chemical castration.

== See also ==
- Pollachi Case
- Sulur Rape and Murder Case
- Salem Sexual Scandal Case
