= Sulur rape and murder case =

- Location: Pallapalayam, Coimbatore, Tamil Nadu, India
- Date: May 21, 2026
- Victim: 1
- Accused: 2

On 21 May 2026, a ten-year-old Indian girl was raped and murdered in Pallapalayam, Coimbatore, Tamil Nadu, India. The case had brought significant outrage against the law and order of Tamil Nadu.

== Incident ==
On the 21st of May, the ten-year-old girl went missing at around 5pm, while she was playing outside her house in Pallapayalam. The family had moved to the house 20 days earlier. The girl was found dead at a lake bed near Kannampalayam the following day, after she had been reported missing to the police.

== Background ==
The girl, a Class V student at a government school, went missing on the evening of 21 May 2026, while playing near her residence. Family members, relatives, and neighbours searched for her but were unable to locate her and subsequently lodged a complaint with the Sulur police.

The girl was found dead in a tank on May 22, 2026. Her body was recovered and sent to a government hospital for a post-mortem examination.

The discovery of the body triggered protests by family members, residents of Pallapalayam, and members of the public. Neighbours and local residents, who had been searching for the child for nearly a day, gathered on Tirucharapalli Road in front of the Sulur police station, disrupting traffic from around 9 p.m. as the crowd grew larger.

Some individuals close to the family alleged that the police had earlier informed them that the girl was safe, an assurance they later claimed was untrue.

== Investigations ==
The post-mortem examination reportedly found that the 10-year-old girl had been sexually assaulted and murdered. Two men have been arrested in association with the case.

== Reactions ==
Tamil Nadu Chief Minister C. Joseph Vijay commented and expressed shock on the reported sexual assault and murder of the girl.

Residents and members of the public, along with some social media influencers, raised slogans demanding justice for the girl and the arrest of those responsible. The family of the victim refused to receive the body from the mortuary, stating that they would not accept it until they received an assurance from the Chief Minister.

Leader of the Opposition Udhayanidhi Stalin alleged that 30 major incidents of crime, including the girl’s murder, were reported within 12 days of Chief Minister C. Joseph Vijay assuming office. AIADMK general secretary Edappadi K. Palaniswami said the government did not take swift action after receiving a complaint about the girl’s disappearance.

== Controversy ==
Following the arrest of the accused in the case, a video showing senior police officers, including the Inspector General, Deputy Inspector General, and Superintendent of Police, interacting informally at press briefing was circulated on social media. The video drew public criticism, with some users describing the officers’ conduct as insensitive in the context of the investigation into the girl’s death.

Tamil Nadu Industries Minister S. Keerthana faced criticism after a video of her smiling during a media interaction related to the case circulated. BJP leaders alleged that her conduct was insensitive and that she appeared dismissive while responding to questions on the killing. However the MLA Keerthana has said that the smile wasn't a smile on purpose but a smile at the end of a conversation.

The mother of the girl alleged that her husband took the child’s body to Salem and cremated it without her consent or allowing her to view the mortal remains. She also stated that she would not accept her daughter’s body until “justice is served”. She further alleged that the body was released from a morgue in Coimbatore after her husband’s signature was obtained.

== Aftermath ==
The abduction, sexual assault, and murder of the girl occurred shortly after the Tamilaga Vettri Kazhagam (TVK) came to power with C. Joseph Vijay as Chief Minister. Some commentators described the incident as a “dark spot” in the early days of the TVK government.

== See also ==
- Violence against women in Tamil Nadu
- 2019 Pollachi sexual assault case
