= List of most-polluted cities by particulate matter concentration =

This list contains the most-polluted cities by PM2.5 annual mean concentration measurement as documented by the World Health Organization (WHO) covering the period from 2019 to 2022. The January 2024 version of the WHO database contains results of ambient (outdoor) air pollution monitoring from almost 5,390 towns and cities in 63 countries. Air quality in the database is represented by the annual mean concentration of particulate matter (PM10 and PM2.5, i.e., particles smaller than 10 or 2.5 micrometers, respectively).

Please note that constraints exist in this list as the WHO says these data are not comparable between countries. Data in this list are self-measured and self-reported so some places in Africa and South America which lack air pollution reporting tools are not properly reflected in this list. On the other hand, countries featured in this list with many cities may only mean that they have large and wide air pollution monitoring networks, rather than an indicator of heavy pollution.

City or region	Country	Year	PM2.5	Temporal coverage	PM10	Temporal coverage
Hapur	India	2020	137	NA	227	NA
Lahore	Pakistan	2019	123.9	57	NA	NA
Kabul	Afghanistan	2019	119.8	18	NA	NA
Delhi	India	2020	114.5	NA	194.3	NA
Hotan	China	2019	112.3	92	NA	NA
Noida	India	2020	112	NA	207	NA
Agra	India	2020	111.8	NA	174	NA
Ghaziabad	India	2020	102.8	NA	203	NA
Kashgar	China	2019	90.2	96	NA	NA
Zhanhe	China	2019	89.6	58	NA	NA
Shunhe	China	2019	88.3	43	NA	NA
Dhaka	Bangladesh	2019	86.5	94	NA	NA
Dehradun	India	2020	81.5	NA	138	NA
Chuzhou	China	2019	80.8	16	NA	NA
Peshawar	Pakistan	2019	79.5	52	NA	NA
Suiyang	China	2019	79.2	55	NA	NA
Yindu	China	2019	76.4	98	NA	NA
Jahra Governorate	Kuwait	2021	76	NA	184	NA
Midong	China	2019	72.8	94	NA	NA
Longnan	China	2019	72.2	97	NA	NA
Dushanbe	Tajikistan	2019	71.5	19	NA	NA
Imphal	India	2020	69	NA	137	NA
Muzaffarnagar	India	2020	68.5	NA	145	NA
Hanshan	China	2019	68.2	98	NA	NA
Dongchangfu	China	2019	68.0	73	NA	NA
Wenfeng	China	2019	67.8	97	NA	NA
Xinshi	China	2019	67.7	97	NA	NA
Qiaoxi	China	2019	66.3	97	NA	NA
Puerto Plata	Dominican Republic	2021	66	NA	94.3	NA
Pernik	Bulgaria	2022	66	0	53.2	36
Qindu	China	2019	65.7	96	NA	NA
Howrah	India	2020	65.5	NA	124.8	NA
Asansol	India	2020	65	NA	114	NA
Anyang	China	2020	62	NA	NA	NA
Bhopal	India	2020	61	NA	157.5	NA
Kampala	Uganda	2019	60.2	90	NA	NA
Chandigarh	India	2020	60	NA	92.4	NA
Ulaanbaatar	Mongolia	2019	60	NA	124	NA
Puyang	China	2020	58	NA	NA	NA
Shijiazhuang	China	2020	58	NA	NA	NA
Mangaung	South Africa	2021	57.3	1	120.1	1
Santiago de los Caballeros	Dominican Republic	2020	57.2	NA	81.7	NA
Handan	China	2020	57	NA	NA	NA
Hebi	China	2020	57	NA	NA	NA
Yuncheng	China	2020	57	NA	NA	NA
Durgapur	India	2020	57	NA	107	NA
San Cristóbal	Dominican Republic	2021	56.7	NA	81	NA
Singrauli	India	2020	56.7	NA	143.3	NA
Iğdır	Turkey	2020	56.6	46	90.2	94
Distrito Nacional	Dominican Republic	2021	56	NA	79.1	NA
Jiaozuo	China	2020	56	NA	NA	NA
Agartala	India	2020	55.5	NA	95.5	NA
Kaifeng	China	2020	55	NA	NA	NA
Luohe	China	2020	55	NA	NA	NA
Tshwane	South Africa	2020	54.6	1	32.6	1
Taiyuan	China	2020	54	NA	NA	NA
Xianyang	China	2020	54	NA	NA	NA
Zaozhuang	China	2020	54	NA	NA	NA
Erzurum	Turkey	2019	53.8	97	76.4	89
Heze	China	2020	53	NA	NA	NA
Liaocheng	China	2020	53	NA	NA	NA
Weinan	China	2020	53	NA	NA	NA
Xingtai	China	2020	53	NA	NA	NA
Xuchang	China	2020	53	NA	NA	NA
Guwahati	India	2020	53	NA	86	NA
Gwalior	India	2020	53	NA	139	NA
Kolkata	India	2020	52.2	NA	100.1	NA
Hanoi	Vietnam	2019	52.1	59	NA	NA
Hengshui	China	2020	52	NA	NA	NA
Linfen	China	2020	52	NA	NA	NA
Shangqiu	China	2020	52	NA	NA	NA
Xiangyang	China	2020	52	NA	NA	NA
Zibo	China	2020	52	NA	NA	NA
Jining	China	2020	51	NA	NA	NA
Luoyang	China	2020	51	NA	NA	NA
Nanyang	China	2020	51	NA	NA	NA
Pingdingshan	China	2020	51	NA	NA	NA
Xi An	China	2020	51	NA	NA	NA
Xinxiang	China	2020	51	NA	NA	NA
Zhengzhou	China	2020	51	NA	NA	NA
Baoding	China	2020	50	NA	NA	NA
Fuyang	China	2020	50	NA	NA	NA
Xuzhou	China	2020	50	NA	NA	NA
Zhoukou	China	2020	50	NA	NA	NA
Linyi	China	2020	49	NA	NA	NA
Binzhou	China	2020	49	NA	NA	NA
Dezhou	China	2020	49	NA	NA	NA
Tangshan	China	2020	49	NA	NA	NA
Barrackpore	India	2020	49	NA	78.7	NA
Manama	Bahrain	2019	48.7	88	128.1	83
Baghdad	Iraq	2021	48.5	NA	NA	NA
Hawalli Governorate	Kuwait	2019	48.3	50	127.7	88
Eastern Region	Saudi Arabia	2022	48.2	NA	192.2	NA
Huaibei	China	2020	48	NA	NA	NA
Sanmenxia	China	2020	48	NA	NA	NA
Tianjin	China	2020	48	NA	NA	NA
Kuwait City	Kuwait	2019	47.3	95	NA	NA
Zhlobin	Belarus	2020	47	NA	NA	NA
Baoji	China	2020	47	NA	NA	NA
Bozhou	China	2020	47	NA	NA	NA
Cangzhou	China	2020	47	NA	NA	NA
Harbin	China	2020	47	NA	NA	NA
Jinan	China	2020	47	NA	NA	NA
Jinzhou	China	2020	47	NA	NA	NA
Ürümqi	China	2020	47	NA	NA	NA
Weifang	China	2020	47	NA	NA	NA
Jincheng	China	2020	46	NA	NA	NA
Suzhou, Anhui	China	2020	46	NA	NA	NA
Tai'an	China	2020	46	NA	NA	NA
Yangquan	China	2020	46	NA	NA	NA
Dubai	United Arab Emirates	2021	45.8	97	118.5	97
Makkah Region	Saudi Arabia	2021	45.6	NA	134.8	NA
Düzce	Turkey	2020	45.4	53	53.4	89
Ahmadi Governorate	Kuwait	2021	45.3	NA	156	NA
Babylon Governorate	Iraq	2019	45	NA	NA	NA
Dongying	China	2020	45	NA	NA	NA
Huai'an	China	2020	45	NA	NA	NA
Jingmen	China	2020	45	NA	NA	NA
Suqian	China	2020	45	NA	NA	NA
Zhumadian	China	2020	45	NA	NA	NA
Sitra	Bahrain	2019	44.7	84	100.3	84
Medina Province	Saudi Arabia	2022	44.5	NA	113.7	NA
Dubai	United Arab Emirates	2019	44.4	89	108.5	NA
Karachi	Pakistan	2019	44.3	56	NA	NA
Anshan	China	2020	44	NA	NA	NA
Baotou	China	2020	44	NA	NA	NA
Changzhi	China	2020	44	NA	NA	NA
Xinzhou	China	2020	44	NA	NA	NA
Haldia	India	2020	44	NA	86.5	NA
Siliguri	India	2020	44	NA	94	NA
Mumbai	India	2019	43.4	90	89	63
Dr Kenneth Kaunda	South Africa	2019	43.4	1	48.8	1
Bengbu	China	2020	43	NA	NA	NA
Fushun	China	2020	43	NA	NA	NA
Huludao	China	2020	43	NA	NA	NA
Tongchuan	China	2020	43	NA	NA	NA
Yiyang	China	2020	43	NA	NA	NA
Zigong	China	2020	43	NA	NA	NA
South Sumatra	Indonesia	2019	42.7	99	45.9	99
Tuzla	Bosnia and Herzegovina	2021	42.6	95	NA	NA
Živinice	Bosnia and Herzegovina	2021	42.2	84	NA	NA
Hyderabad	India	2019	42.1	87	NA	NA
Changchun	China	2020	42	NA	NA	NA
Changsha	China	2020	42	NA	NA	NA
Jinzhong	China	2020	42	NA	NA	NA
Langfang	China	2020	42	NA	NA	NA
Shenyang	China	2020	42	NA	NA	NA
Kharagpur	India	2020	42	NA	117	NA
Sambalpur	India	2020	42	NA	67	NA
Tashkent	Uzbekistan	2019	42	81	NA	NA
Riyadh Province	Saudi Arabia	2022	41.6	NA	303.9	NA
Cuttack	India	2020	41.5	NA	92	NA
Mamak	Turkey	2020	41.1	91	65.5	93
Johannesburg	South Africa	2020	41.1	1	50.4	1
Changde	China	2020	41	NA	NA	NA
Chengdu	China	2020	41	NA	NA	NA
Jilin	China	2020	41	NA	NA	NA
Liaoyang	China	2020	41	NA	NA	NA
Suihua	China	2020	41	NA	NA	NA
Yichang	China	2020	41	NA	NA	NA
Yingkou	China	2020	41	NA	NA	NA
Doha	Qatar	2019	41	1	208	1
Lukavac	Bosnia and Herzegovina	2021	40.3	75	NA	NA
Balasore	India	2020	40.3	NA	78.3	NA
Changzhou	China	2020	40	NA	NA	NA
Hanzhong	China	2020	40	NA	NA	NA
Hohhot	China	2020	40	NA	NA	NA
Shizuishan	China	2020	40	NA	NA	NA
Xinyang	China	2020	40	NA	NA	NA
Yibin	China	2020	40	NA	NA	NA
Kanpur	India	2020	40	NA	191.6	NA
Pljevlja	Montenegro	2020	40	66	52.7	65

== See also ==
- Healthy city
- Zero-carbon city
