= Salem Sexual Scandal Case =

2025 scandal in Tamil Nadu, India

The Salem Sexual Scandal Case is a sexual scandal in Salem, Tamil Nadu, India. Sexual Violence, Rape, extortion and blackmail are the types of crime that were carried out in this case. This sexual scandal had begun in late 2025 – 12 June 2026, when the case was discovered. But according various sources some say it began 3 years ago.

== Incident ==
The main accused M. Manikandan aged 42, was a grocery store owner and had carried out sexual assaults on women and captured them using his phone. It is said that more than 50 obscene videos were on his phone.

== Controversy ==
The accused Manikandan was an open supporter of the Tamilaga Vettri Kazhagam (TVK) ruling party of Tamil Nadu; however, the Salem South district secretary R.S. Manikandan of the TVK party has explained that the accused was not associated with the party and held no positions in TVK.

== Investigation ==
As of 12 June, the accused Manikandan has remained in judiciary custody under the Salem police. The Salem police have filed an FIR against the accused. The police have formalised cases under seven unique legal sections against Manikandan.

== See also ==
- Violence against women in Tamil Nadu
