= Thirumurugan Gandhi =

Indian human rights activist

- Education: Madurai Kamaraj University
- Occupation: Political activist
- Movement: May 17 Movement

Thirumurugan Gandhi is an Indian human rights activist and geopolitical commentator noted for founding the May 17 Movement. The movement initially campaigned for the rights and justice for the killings of Eelam Tamil for their separate Tamil Eelam, primarily those affected by the last stages of the Sri Lankan Civil War.

Thirumurugan Gandhi advocates for the democratic aspirations of Eelam Tamils, Palestinians, Kurds, Catalonia, Kashmiris, Western Saharans and Sikhs. He has also spoken in the Geneva human rights sessions in the United Nations (UN) for the past three years in support of the nations without states, indigenous peoples and communities which have faced war crimes against the imperial forces. He has represented Tamil civil society in Permanent people's Tribunal for Sri Lanka in Bremen, Germany (2013).

On 29 May 2017, Gandhi along with four others were arrested under Goondas Act by Tamil Nadu police when they attempted to light candles in remembrance of Tamils who were killed in the conflict between the Sri Lankan government and the Liberation Tigers of Tamil Eelam. Director Ameer Sultan, who also participated in this event, said that the arrest of Thirumurugan Gandhi was politically motivated. Director Vetrimaaran described it as an attack on freedom of expression. This particular arrest even they were asked to be released in the United Nations Human Rights Commission. He was released on 20 September 2017 by the Indian government. After his release, he strongly criticised the Indian government and accused it of suppressing the rights of Tamils. Thirumurugan Gandhi said, he is not afraid of oppression and will continue to fight for the rights of Tamils and Tamil Nadu. He considers the whole as a fight between Indian nationalism and Tamil nationalism.

In 2016 Thirumurugan Gandhi alleged that BJP Government at the centre had secretly signed Trade facilitation agreement in World Trade Organisation (WTO) It suggests.

1. Stop selling food items at low cost at Government outlets.
2. Stop all types of subsidies: a) Subsidies on food items to consumers, b) Subsidies on power supply and fertilises to farmers.
3. Allowing multinational companies to import food items to India which will totally affect Indian farmers and destroy Indian Economy.

He represented Eelam Tamil people and LTTE that how they were destroyed by International community in side event at the human rights council organised by Association Solidarité Internationale Afrique in Partnership with Association Bharathi Centre Culturel Franco-Tamoul, Association Des Etudiants Tamoules de France, and Swiss Council of Eelam Tamils and Zagros Human Rights Center held on 17 March 2017, 15h00 – 16h30 - Room XXVII UNOG, Palais des Nations.

Thirumurugan Gandhi said that The Syrian Civil War was an ongoing multi-sided armed conflict in Syria fought primarily between the government of President Bashar al-Assad, along with its allies, and various forces opposing the government. Thirumurugan Gandhi explains in depth of Syria War, why it is happening and what is the cause of the war? He also compares the same with Tamil Eelam War and said that it would happen in Tamil Nadu soon if Tamil people were unaware of geopolitics.

In July 2018, Gandhi spoke at the 38th session of the United Nations Human Rights Council meeting about the May 2018 Thoothukudi Massacre in Tamil Nadu. On 9 August 2018, Gandhi was detained by immigration authorities at Bangalore Airport on his return to India. He was handed over to Chennai Police by the airport police. Gandhi was charged under Section 124 A (sedition), 153 A (1) and 153 (b) (promoting enmity between different groups on grounds of religion, race etc.) of the Indian Penal Code (IPC). He was produced in court the next day, where the police argued that a video of his speech uploaded by the UNHRC instigated hatred among people. Magistrate S Prakash refused to detain him and asked for him to be set free after interrogation. A few minutes after the police released him, he was again arrested, without a warrant. A video of the police kidnapping Thirumurugan Gandhi went viral on social media. Then Tamil Nadu police took him to puzhal central prison and then he was shifted to Vellore Central Prison.

On 24 August 2018, Gandhi was produced in court in a sedition case filed for his criticism of corporate influence in a Facebook video. At the court, Gandhi said he had been kept in solitary confinement in the Vellore prison, prevented from meeting his family, and prevented from answering calls of nature. On 26 August, Gandhi was booked under the Unlawful Activities Prevention Act (UAPA) by the Nungambakkam police.
