= Puducherry Prevention of Anti-social Activities Act, 2008 =

Puducherry Legislative Assembly
- Enacted by: Puducherry Legislative Assembly
- Status: In force

The Puducherry Prevention of Anti-social Activities Act, 2008 (PPASA) is an act of the Puducherry assembly which provides for preventive detention of boot-leggers, dangerous persons, forest offenders, gamblers, goondas and property grabbers for prevention of their anti-social and dangerous activities prejudicial to the maintenance of public order.

The bill was introduced in the assembly on 20 October 2008, and the act came into effect from 27 October 2010.

== See also ==
- Tamil Nadu Goondas Act
