= 2019 Pollachi sexual assault case =

In Tamil Nadu, India

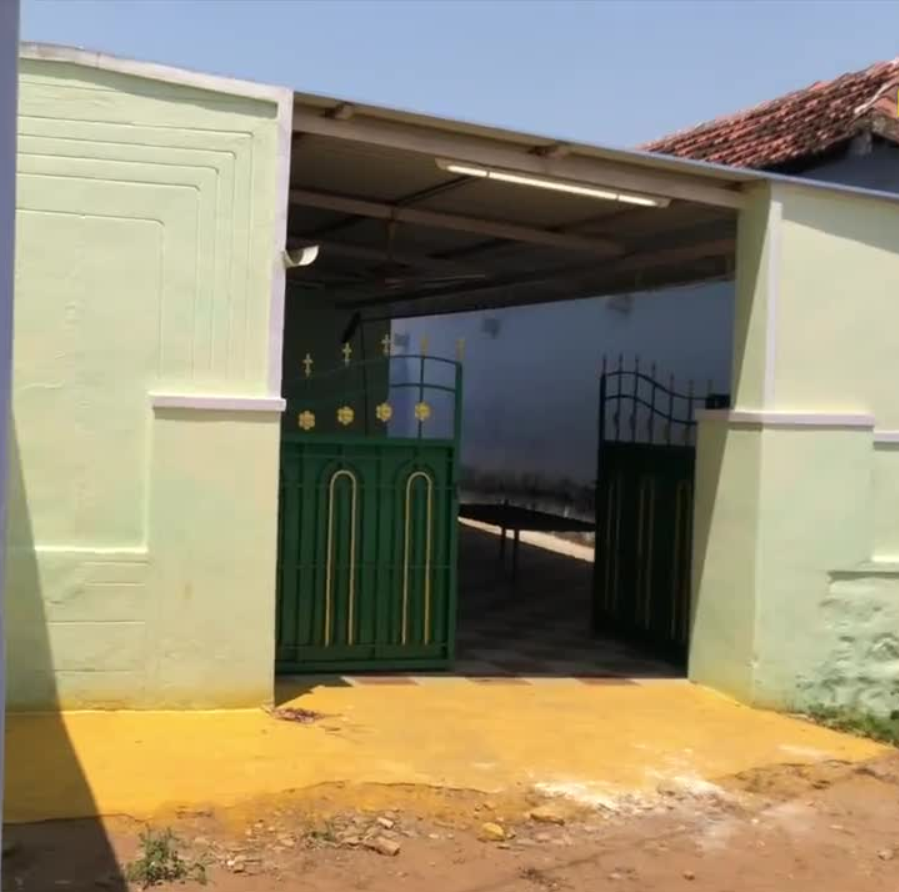
The farm house belonging to one of the accused where women were sexually assaulted and filmed

The Pollachi sexual assault case refers to a case of rape and extortion of numerous women by a gang in Pollachi, Coimbatore in the Indian state of Tamil Nadu. The gang would entice women into isolated places after befriending them on social media and sexually assault them and film the act. The videos were later used to blackmail the women for sexual favors or money. The gang came into spotlight after the family of a 19-year-old college student who claimed to have been sexually assaulted and blackmailed complained to the police. According to media accounts, at least 200 women, including college and school teachers, doctors, and higher secondary school students from all over the state, were sexually assaulted in the same manner. Police discovered dozens of video recordings of women being abused on the phone belonging to one of the accused. Some videos were leaked.

There were protests across the state organized by students, political parties and various organizations to bring the perpetrators to justice.

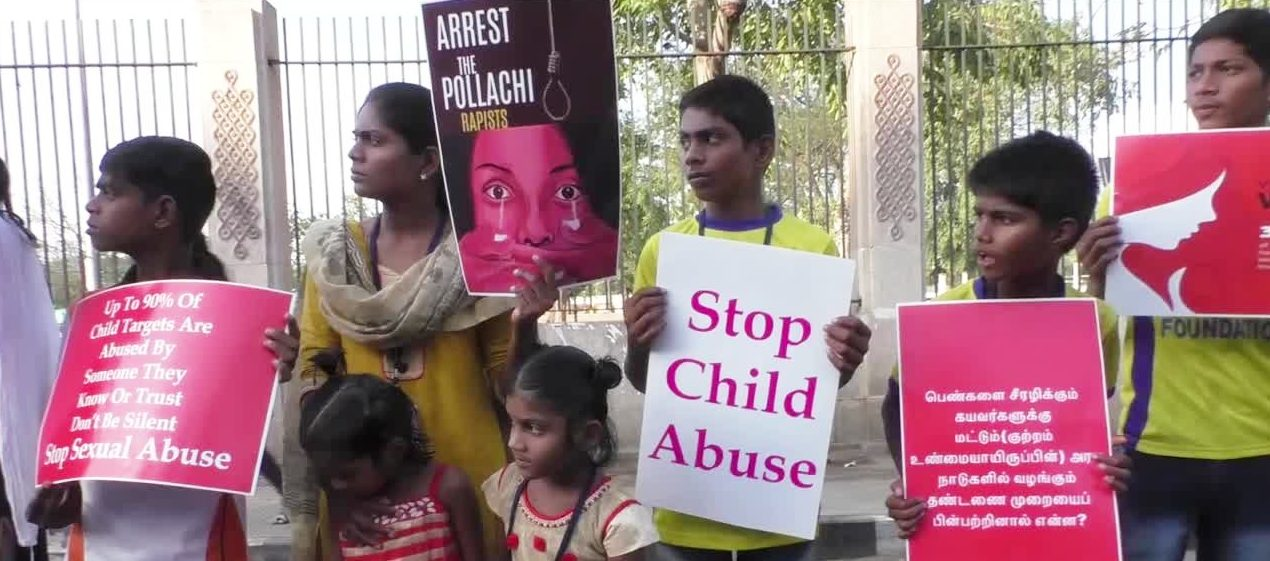
Demonstration to bring the perpetrators to justice, 2019

The police arrested four men who were alleged to be involved in the rape and extortion ring. The case was shifted to the Central Bureau of Investigation (CBI), another man surrendered before the judicial magistrate and confessed to raping and blackmailing women. Later the five men were sent to the Salem central prison. The CBI arrested three more men involved in the incident in January 2021. The CBI made minimal progress before these arrests

On May 13, 2025, the Mahila Court in Coimbatore found all nine accused guilty and sentenced them to life imprisonment. The court also ordered Tamil Nadu government pay a total compensation of ₹85 lakh (US$91,000) to eight survivors of sexual assault.

== Incident ==
On February 12, 2019, a 19-year-old college student in Pollachi received a call from an acquaintance who said he needed to speak with her alone about something important and told her to meet him near a bus stop. He invited her to get into the car with him and his friend, who was also another acquaintance of hers, and that they would speak on the way. Two more men got in the car unexpectedly and the girl was forcibly undressed and videotaped, and a gold chain she was wearing was snatched by the men. They threatened her to provide them sexual favors and money if they wanted it, or they would post the video of their assault online. They abandoned her in the middle of the road after she screamed and cried.

She kept the incident hidden from her family. When the men repeatedly blackmailed her and threatened to extort money from her, she chose to confide in her family. Two men involved were then tracked by her brother and his friends, who beat them up and grabbed the men's mobile phones, which included recordings of at least three other girls whom the men might have coerced. The family reported this to the Pollachi police department, along with a sexual assault and theft lawsuit.

== The rape and extortion ring ==
The victim's story, as well as the mobile seized from the four men, uncovered a huge racket supposed involvement of other more men. The men reportedly used fake Facebook profiles to entice women, they would make a conversation with them and befriend them. Each of the men would entice women to an isolated house or hotel, where he would either rape the women or persuade them to have sex with him. His accomplices would film the act. If it was a sexual assault, one of the companions would hop in to pose as a protector while the other men proceeded to film. The accused had already raped and videotaped other young women, according to the police report. A few video recordings of women being sexually assaulted, reportedly shot at the farmhouse, have been leaked. In these films, girls are seen pleading with the attackers for compassion. Most were taken to a farm house belonging to one of the accused and then raped and filmed. The videos filmed in the farm house were used to later blackmail them for sexual favours and money.

According to media accounts, at least 200 women are sexually assaulted in the very same manner. There were also suspicions that young women in the region who had committed suicide in the previous year were also victims of sexual harassment by the same men. The victims were reportedly college and school teachers, doctors, higher secondary school and college students from Coimbatore, Chennai, Salem, and other areas of Tamil Nadu. Tamil news Magazine Nakkheeran reported that the racket involved about 275 girls and 1,100 videos. According to some local media, the group has been targeting women since 2013.

The Pollachi police department issued a public appeal for women who have been victimized by the gang to come forward and register a complaint.

== Arrests by the police ==
On February 24, 2019, the police lodged an FIR against all four men involved. On the same day as the complaint, the three men were detained. They were put into legal remand after being brought before a judicial magistrate in Pollachi. The police filed Goondas Act on the four accused. They were arrested by the police on March 10, 2019. Police arrested the secretary of the AIADMK's 'Amma Forum' in Pollachi town on March 12, 2019, for allegedly threatening and beating the victim's brother. He was expelled out of the party's primary earlier membership for allegedly attempting to defend an accused in the case. The AIADMK functionary was released on bail three days later.

== Protests ==
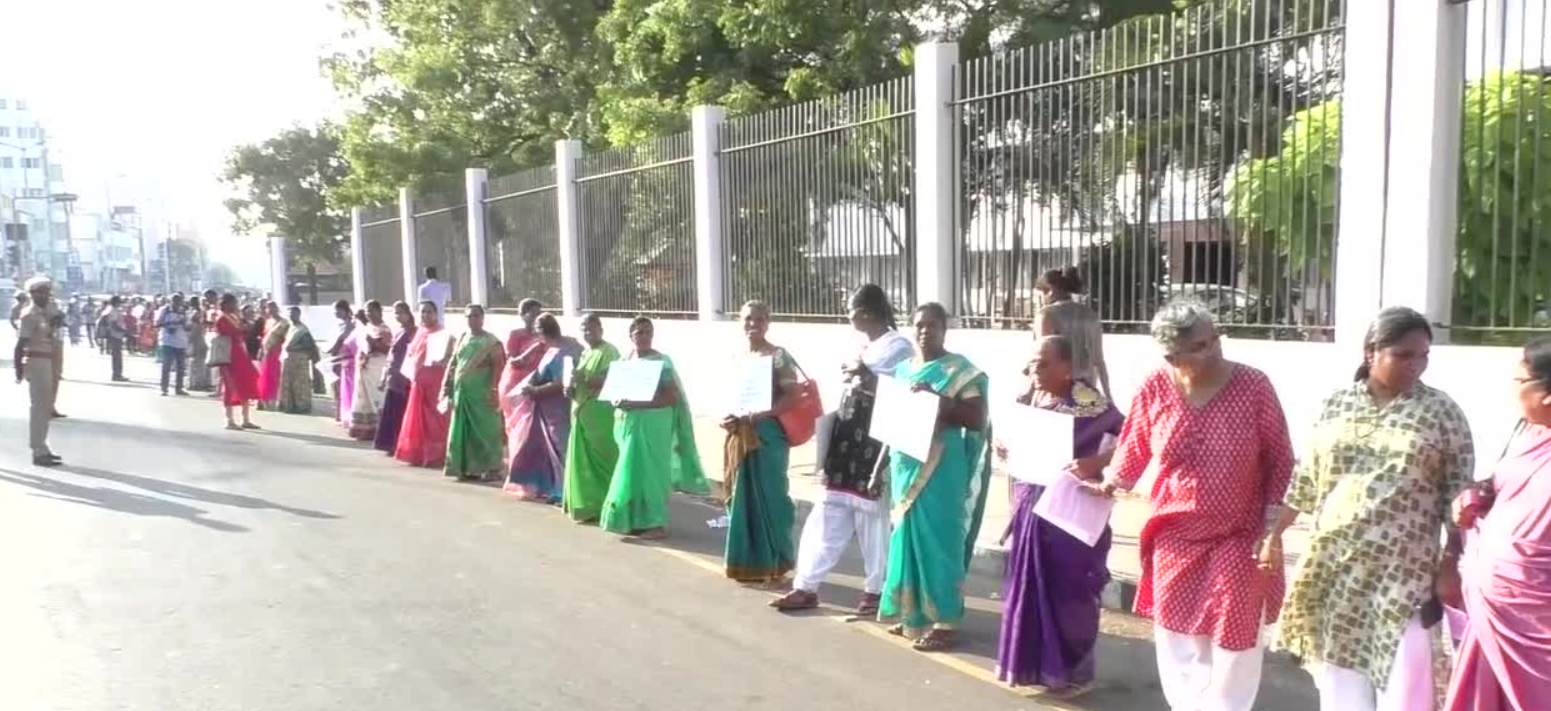
Women in demonstration against the incident

Hundreds of teachers, attorneys, and affiliates of women's groups marched throughout the state in March 2019, asking that the perpetrators be brought to justice. Government arts college students in Coimbatore and Tiruppur held a protest by skipping classes. About 300 students from different universities in Chennai took part in the demonstration. There were also protests by 250 students from Tiruvannamalai's Government Arts College. Outside the court complex in Coimbatore, lawyers staged a protest. They requested that an investigation into the case be led by a female judge from the Madras High Court. Students studying Siddha medicines in Tirunelveli also protested on March 18, 2019, by pinning black tags to their white coats. Over 300 students from Vellore's Voorhees College held a sit-in protest, shouting slogans demanding protection for women, specifically when they were away from home.

Members of the Democratic Youth Federation of India, All India Democratic Women's Association, the Students Federation of India, Dravida Munnetra Kazhagam, the Viduthalai Chiruthaigal Katchi formed a human chain in Pudukkottai demanding that the accused be brought to justice. The Dravida Munnetra Kazhagam (DMK) staged a huge protest on March 12, led by Member of Parliament, Kanimozhi. Around 1,000 college students from Pollachi and the surrounding areas held a rally calling for justice in the incident.

== Central Bureau of Investigation ==
The Tamil Nadu government transferred the case to the Central Bureau of Investigation (CBI) on March 12, 2019. Another person surrendered before the chief judicial magistrate court on March 25, 2019. He confessed that he raped some women with the arrested men and made videos. The CBI filed a charge sheet against five accused on 24 May 2019, claiming that they were members of an organized criminal group that communicated with one another. CBI registered two FIRs against eight accused on 28 April 2019. The CBI visited the farm house of the accused in May 2019 and after examining the area, they confirmed one place where a young girl was sexually harassed by the group. The five men were sent to Salem Central Prison in June 2019.

The CBI arrested three more men, including AIADMK youth wing member on 6 January 2021. The CBI made minimal progress on the case before the arrest in January 2021.

An anonymous victim claimed in a recorded audio clip that a young girl died after she was gang-raped by the arrested accused and his accomplices at his farm house and later her body was buried at the back.

On February 19, the Nakkheeran reported that the CBI had confiscated a vehicle belonging to a former AIADMK councillor. The criminals reportedly used the vehicle to entice girls and then abuse them. The perpetrators reportedly exploited the women's photographs to blackmail them and send the women to powerful people in order to get money. Former Pollachi Municipal Chairman, a member of the AIADMK, was also allegedly reported to be with these woman. V. Jayaraman was said to be close to both the ex-councilor and the Municipal Chairman.

Activists and journalists reported that, despite the arrests, there appears to be no inquiry into the role of the Pollachi policemen in either assisting the ring or covering up the crime. They claimed that the police made numerous procedural errors, which allowed for the release of several important suspects, notably those with ties to the AIADMK, and made it more difficult for survivors of the incident to tell the authorities.

All the nine accused in the case were brought before the Mahila Court in Coimbatore in February 2024, following the submission of fresh material items by the CBI the previous month.

== Politics over the incident ==
In those videos and photographs, there is a lot of details on prominent party men. I'm about to tell you a major truth. I need the backing of the opposition party's head, media contacts, an advocate, and a judge.

— a prime accused in the case,

The AIADMK was criticized for its alleged role in the incident after the arrest of its functionary, with some news reports implying that the connection to the incident runs deeper within the party. M.K Stalin, the DMK's president, said that AIADMK leaders were attempting to protect the persons detained in the case. These allegations were gaining ground after the release of the AIADMK functionary three days after his arrest. The District Secretary of the All India Democratic Women's Association, Radhika A alleged that the AIADMK secretary was not charged with sexual assault on purpose because of his political membership. The AIADMK's Information Technology cell lodged a separate complaint with the police, requesting that individuals propagating propaganda against the ruling party and its leaders be prosecuted. Thirunavukkarasu, the main accused, requested that the investigation be transferred to the CBI, saying that politically powerful people were engaged in the case. According to news sources in the Tamil media, the local Member of Legislative Assembly (MLA) and AIADMK Deputy Speaker V Jayaraman's son was linked to people involved in the incident. Jayaraman denied any family links to the case.

=== Revealing survivor's identity ===
There is a popular assumption that the BJP is attempting to bully the AIADMK in Coimbatore, which is regarded the party's stronghold.... When there was an open indictment against AIADMK bigshots in Pollachi, there should have been more arrests by now. Since that has not occurred, and the CBI arresting the accused at this point makes us believe the allegations against the BJP are real, and they are attempting to use this to preserve their image and gain political advantage.

— Ira Murugavel, an author and political commentator.,

On March 1, Coimbatore SP R. Pandiarajan had a televised news conference in which he announced the survivor's name which is a criminal offence by law. On March 6, police issued a press statement in which they unlawfully identified the survivor by revealing her name, educational background, and location. The survivor filed a plea with the Coimbatore District Collector, demanding that her identity be protected. The Madras High Court ordered the government of Tamil Nadu to provide an immediate compensation of ₹ 25 lakh to the survivor for "violation of her privacy, dignity, and image" in an attempt to avoid similar cases where government officials expose the name of a survivors of sexual assault. A Public Interest Litigation was lodged in the Supreme Court requesting action against SP R Pandiarajan for revealing the name. According to Kanimozhi, the survivor's name was exposed solely to silence other women and prevent them from coming forward and reporting, she also said that the AIADMK was trying to protect the accused in the case and Kanimozhi demanded a re-investigation by the police into all female suicides in Pollachi during the last seven years. In April 2019, the state government transferred police officers involved in the case, including a Superintendent of Police who exposed the victim's identify.

== Trial and sentencing ==
On 14 May 2025, a Mahila Court (Special Court) in Coimbatore found all nine accused in the Pollachi sexual assault case guilty, including a former office-bearer of the AIADMK students’ wing. The court sentenced them to life imprisonment under Sections 376D and 376(2)(n) of the Indian Penal Code. It also directed the state government to pay a total compensation of ₹85 lakh to the eight survivors.

The trial was conducted in a specially designated courtroom at the Coimbatore Combined Court Complex, in accordance with directions issued by the Madras High Court. The courtroom was equipped with one-way vision glass to ensure the privacy of the survivors. The identities of the survivors were withheld from official records and public documents. The court examined approximately 40 witnesses during the course of the trial.

On 15 May 2025, the Tamil Nadu Government has announced an additional compensation of ₹25 lakh to each of the survivors, over and above the ₹85 lakh compensation awarded by the special court.
