= May 17 Movement =

Tamil nationalist organisation

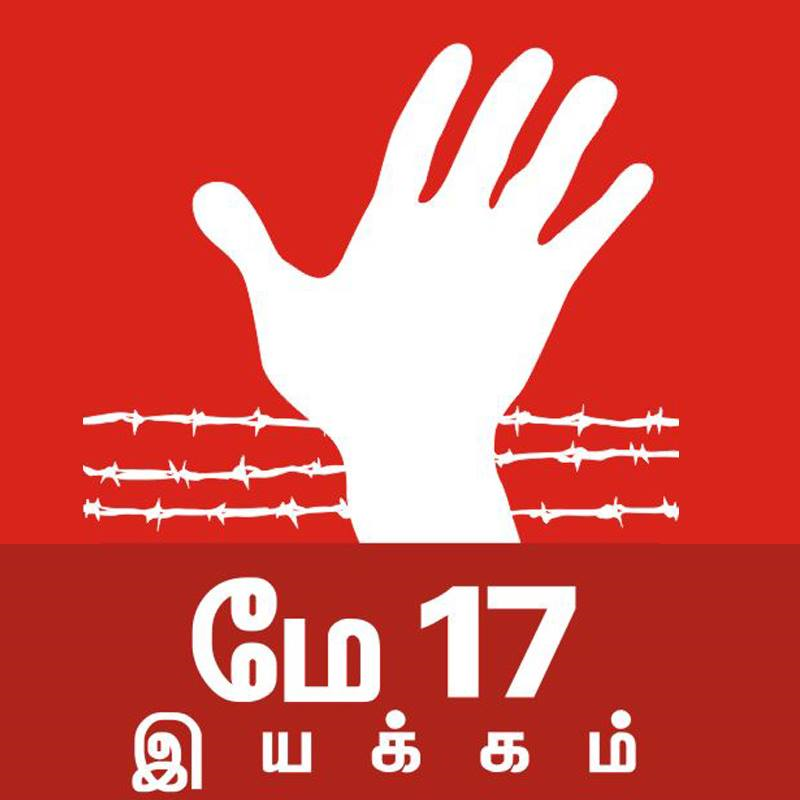
- Formation: 2009
- Purpose: Political Movement
- Headquarters: Chennai, Tamil Nadu
- Fields: Tamil Eelam Struggle, Tamil Nationalism, Human Rights Protection, Rationalism, Communism, Environmentalism
- Key people: Thirumurugan Gandhi, Praveen Kumar, Lena Kumar
- Website: may17iyakkam.com

The May 17 Movement is a Tamil civil rights movement which advocates for justice for the Tamil genocide in Tamil Eelam, as well as the rights of Tamils in Tamil Nadu and around the world.

== Overview ==
The May 17 Movement was formed in May 2009, founded by activist Thirumurugan Gandhi during the Sri Lankan civil war, where thousands of Tamils were killed. It is a Tamil nationalist movement based in Tamil Nadu which works towards a goal of ending the caste system. The movement intends to draw attention to the controversial Trade Facilitation Agreement policy of the World Trade Organization (WTO) accepted and signed by the government of India.

The May 17 movement advocates for the liberation of Tamil Eelam, seeking a separate state for Sri Lankan Tamils. Since 2016, it has spoken to United Nations (UN) human rights sessions in Geneva in support of the nations without states, indigenous peoples, and communities which have faced war crimes. It represented the Tamil civil society in Permanent Peoples' Tribunal for Sri Lanka in Bremen, Germany in 2013.

Every year, on the third Sunday of May, the May 17 Movement coordinates a candlelight vigil at Chennai Marina beach (Tamizhar Kadal) to observe Mullivaikkal Remembrance Day, marking the massacre of Tamils by government forces at the end of the Sri Lankan civil war. People from across Tamil Nadu gather to mourn the Tamil genocide, call for the Liberation of Tamil Eezham, and demand a referendum for Eezham.
