= Thirumuruganpoondi =

Thirumuruganpoondi Municipality Skandhamapuri pattanam
- Town
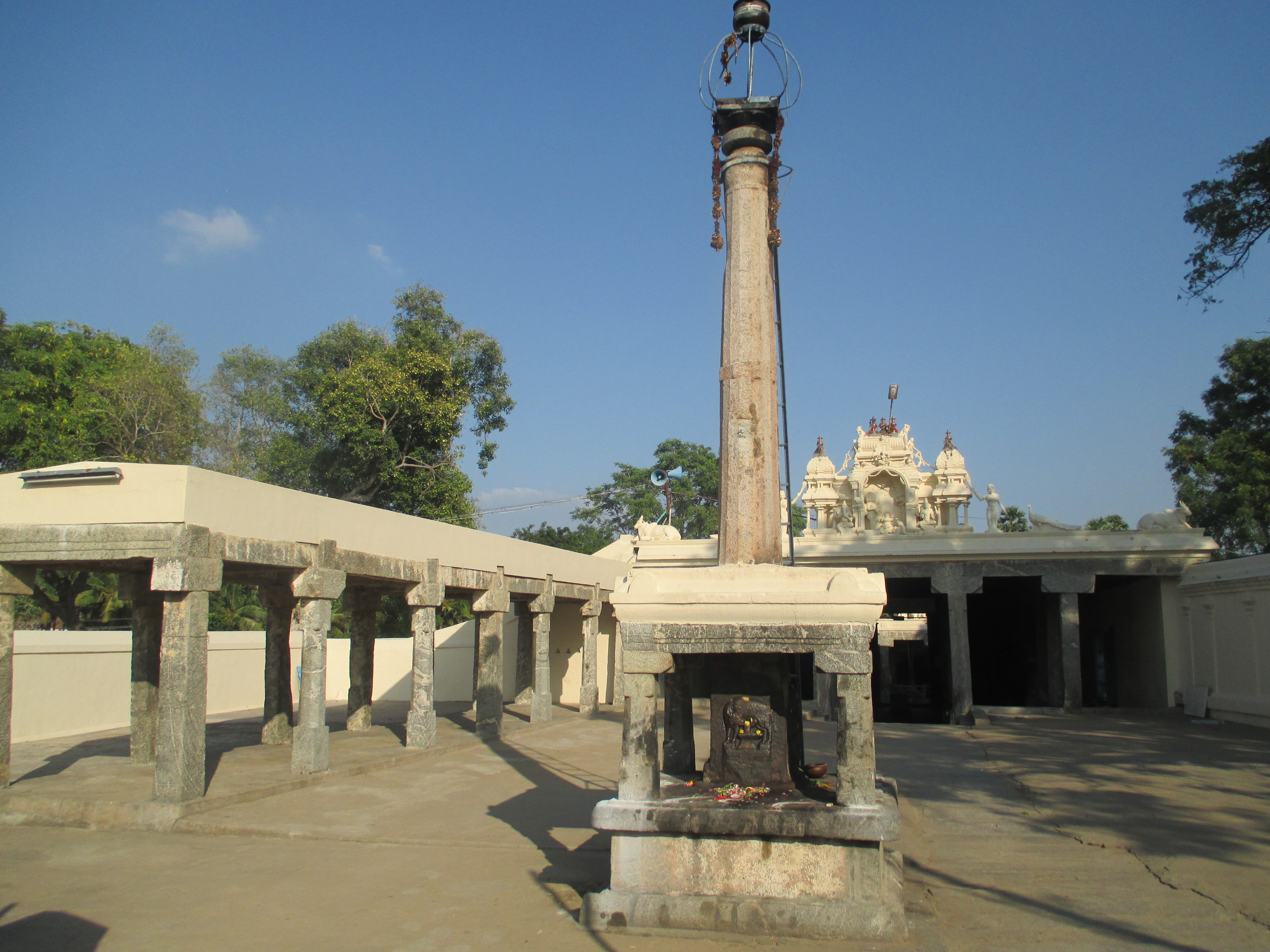
- Thirumuruganatheeswar Temple
- Interactive map of Thirumuruganpoondi Municipality
- Coordinates: 11.1788°N 77.3145°E
- Country: India
- State: Tamil Nadu
- District: Tirupur

Population (2001)
  - Total: 18,459

Languages
  - Official: Tamil
- Time zone: UTC+5:30 (IST)
- Postal code: 641***
- Vehicle registration: TN 39

Thirumuruganpoondi is a Municipality in Tirupur District in the Indian state of Tamil Nadu. It is about 7 kilometres (4 mi) South from Tirupur city and 38 kilometres (24 mi) west from Coimbatore city.

== Etymology ==
The place derives its name from the Murugan temple: Thirumuruganatheeswar Temple present in the town.

== Geography ==
The village is about 7 km from Tirupur city and about 4 km from the Avinashi.

== Demographics ==
As of 2001 India census, Thirumuruganpoondi had a population of 18,459. Males constitute 52% of the population and females 48%. A.Thirumuruganpoondi has an average literacy rate of 69%, higher than the national average of 59.5%; with 58% of the males and 42% of females literate. 12% of the population is under 6 years of age.

== Landmark ==
Thirumuruganatheeswar Temple.
