= Thirumuruganatheeswar Temple =

Thirumuruganatheeswarar Temple
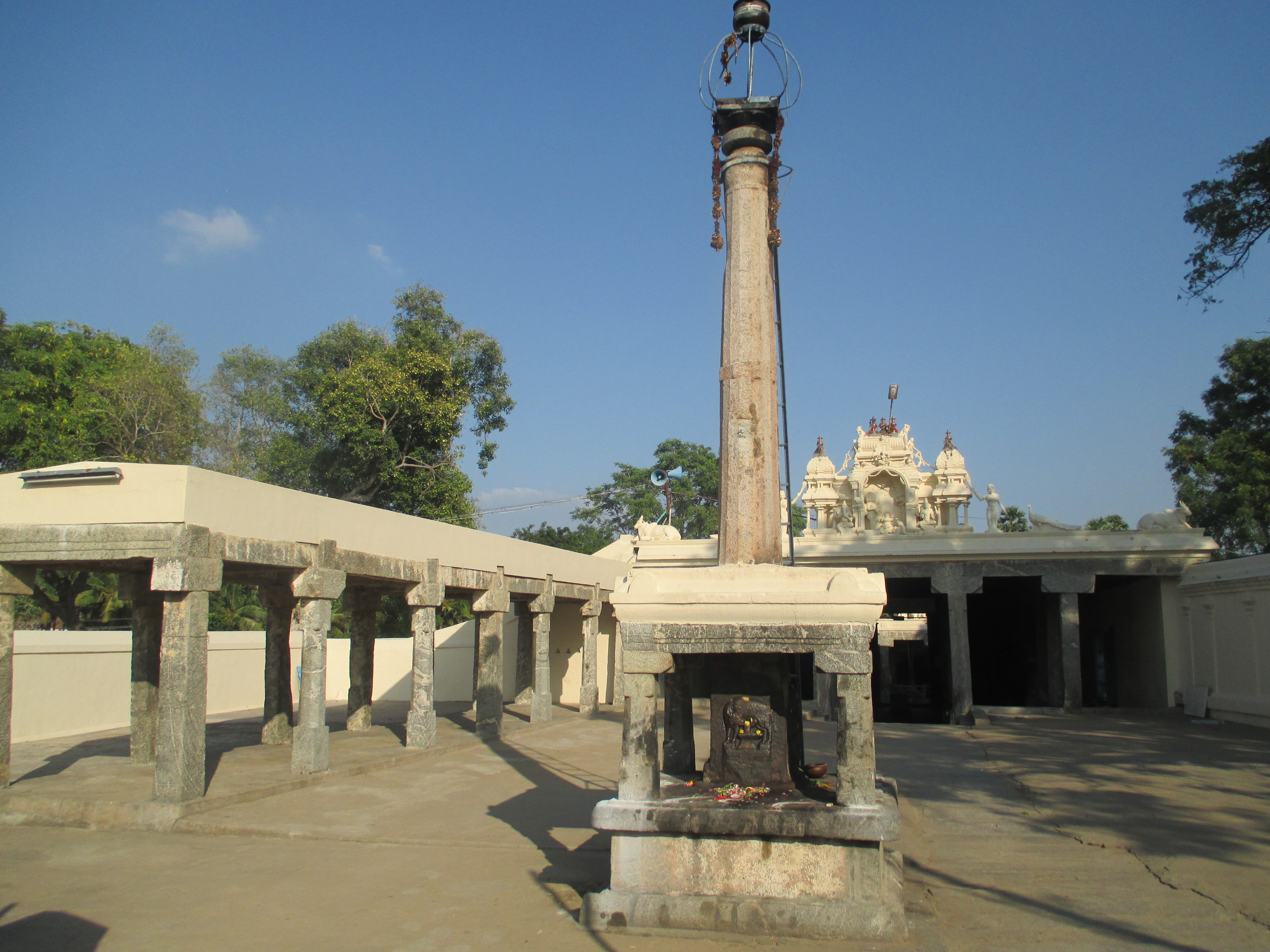

- Location in Tamil Nadu

Religion
- Affiliation: Hinduism
- District: Tiruppur
- Deity: Thirumuruganatheeswarar(Shiva) Avudainayagi(Parvathi)

Location
- Location: Thirumuruganpoondi
- State: Tamil Nadu
- Country: India
- Coordinates: 11°09′54″N 77°18′41″E

Architecture
- Type: Dravidian architecture

Website
- thirumuruganpoonditemple.tnhrce.in

Thirumuruganatheeswarar Temple (also called Thirumuruganpoondi temple) in Thirumuruganpoondi, a panchayat town in Tiruppur district in the South Indian state of Tamil Nadu, is dedicated to the Hindu god Shiva. Constructed in the Dravidian style of architecture, the present structure of the temple is believed to have been built during the Kongu Cholas period in the 10th century. Shiva is worshipped as Thirumuruganatheeswarar and his consort Parvathi as Avudainayagi.

The presiding deity is revered in the 7th century Tamil Saiva canonical work, the Tevaram, written by Tamil saint poets known as the Nayanmars and classified as Paadal Petra Sthalam. A granite wall surrounds the temple, enclosing all its shrines. The temple does not have a rajagopuram, the gateway tower, a common feature in South Indian temples.

Four daily rituals and many yearly festivals are held at the temple, of which the Brahmotsavam celebrated during the Tamil month of Maasi (February - March) for Sundarar and Mahashivaratri festival being the most prominent. The temple is maintained and administered by the Hindu Religious and Endowment Board of the Government of Tamil Nadu.

== Legend ==
The name of the village is derived from the lord Murugan who himself is supposed to have installed and worshipped lord Shiva in the temple at this place. Murugan killed the demon king Surapadma at the behest of the Devas. He incurred Brahmahatti Dosha for slaying the demon into two pieces. Muruga is believed to have dug a spring with his Vel, the spear and worshipped Shiva at this place. Since Muruga worshipped his father Shiva, the presiding deity came to be known as Muruganathaswamy.

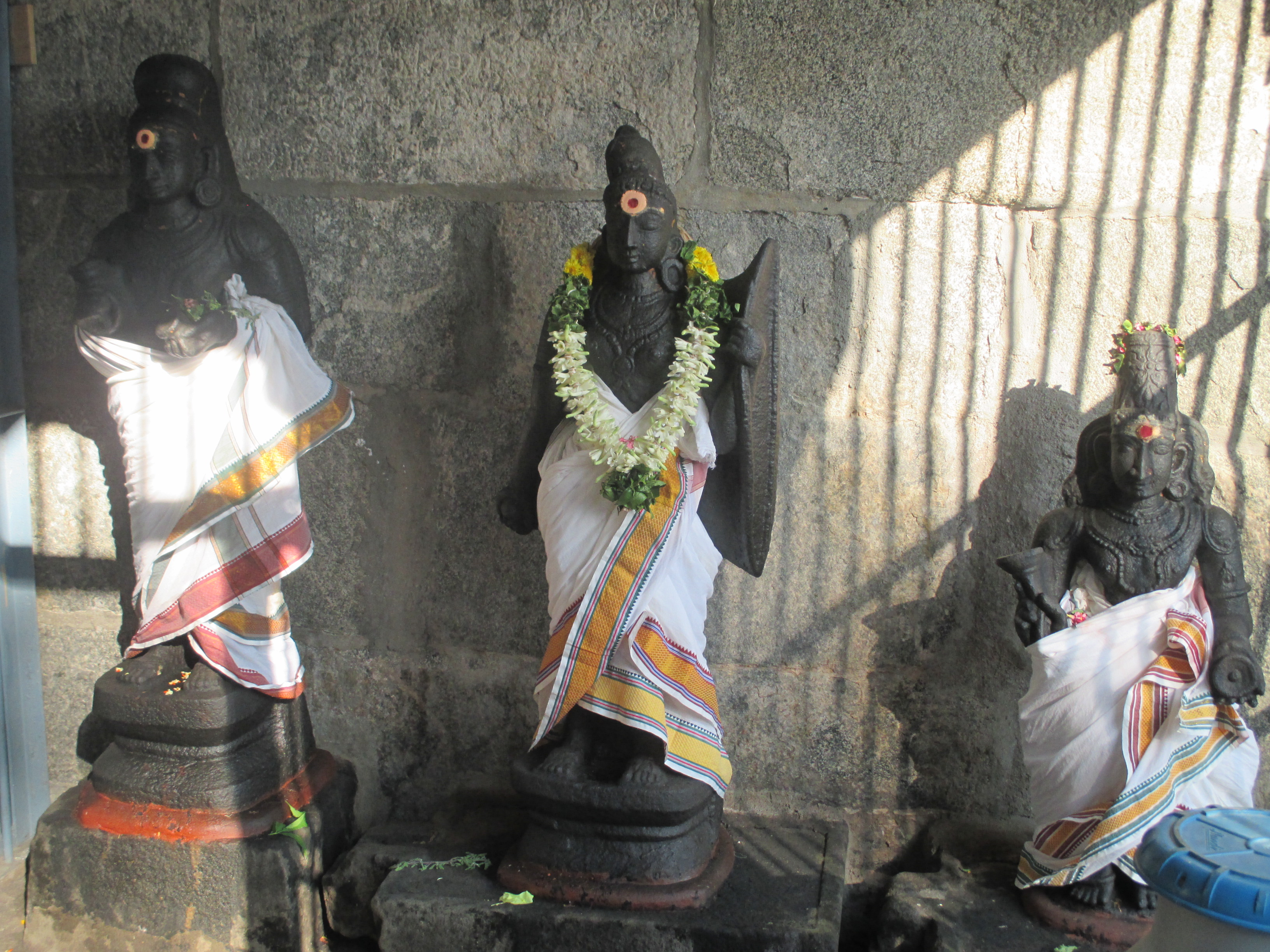
Image of Shiva in the form of a hunter and Sundarar

Sundarar is a famous Saivite saint and Nayanmar belonging to the 8th century. He has revered many Shiva temples in South India in his verses compiled as the Seventh Thirumurai. As per Hindu legend, while arriving at this place, he took rest in a Vinayaka temple. He presumably forgot to get thoughts about Shiva and to test his devotion, Shiva sent his Bhutaganas to steal all his possessions. Sundarar prayed to Vinayaka in the temple who showed him to proceed towards the East. Sundarar, in his anger, sang about Shiva blaming him of not protecting his possessions. Shiva graced him with his presence at this place and restored all his possessions.

== Architecture ==
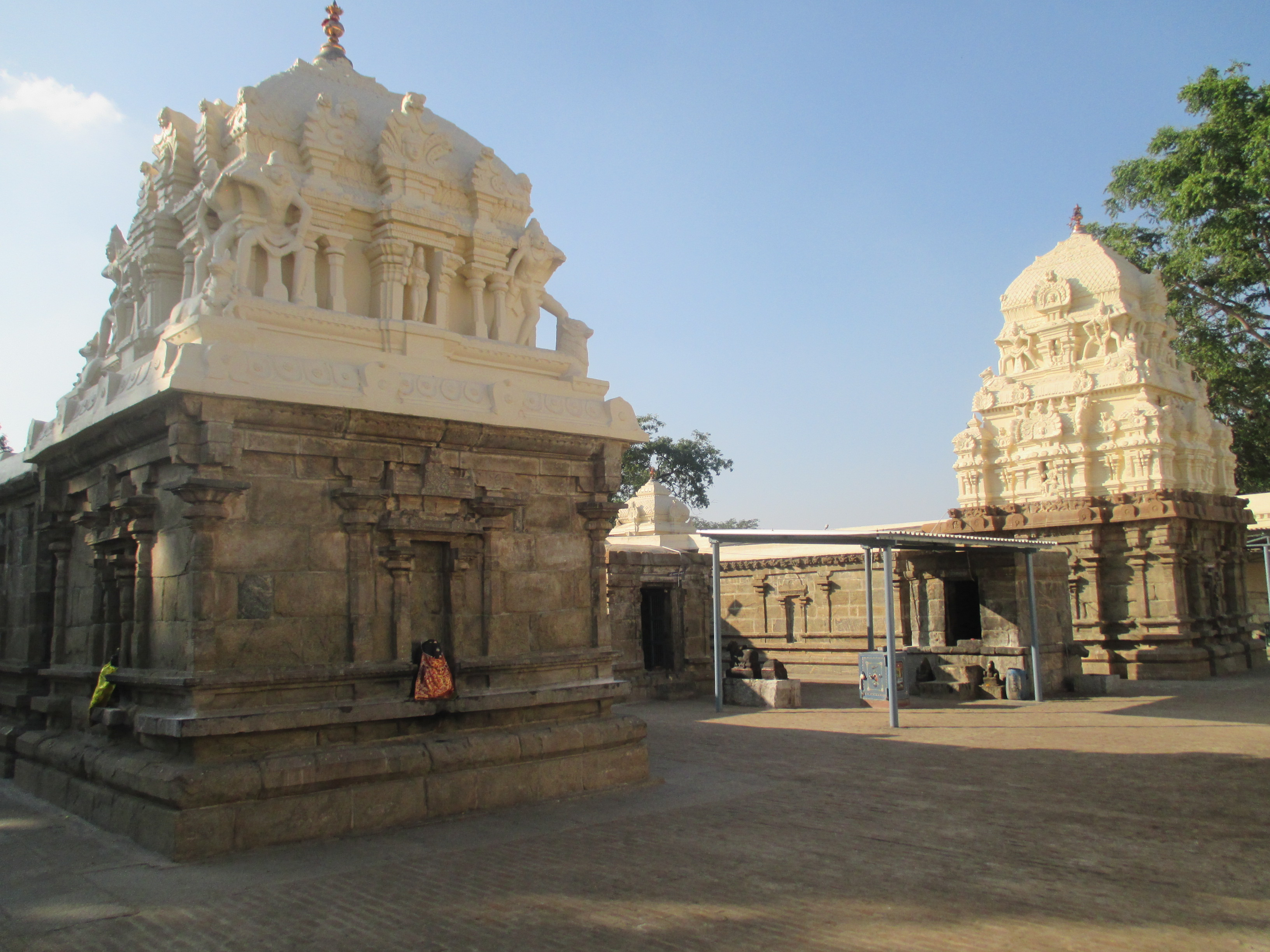
Shrines of Shiva and Parvathi inside the temple

The temple is believed to have been built by the Kongu Cholars, with 68 recorded inscriptions from the king Vikrama Chola I seen on the walls of the sanctum and around the precinct. Thirumuruganatheeswarar temple is located in Thirumuruganpoondi, a village located 9 km (5.6 mi) from Tiruppur on the Tiruppur- Avinasi road. The temple is constructed in Dravidian style of architecture. It is classified as Kokkudi Koil, a temple built in a place surrounding flower garden. As per the inscriptions, the temple was surrounded by Kokkudi, a type of flower plant.

The temple does not have rajagopuram as in other South Indian temples. All the shrines are housed in a rectangular enclosure measuring 1 acre (4,000 m^{2}). The sanctum houses the image of Thirumuruganatheeswarar in the form of Lingam, an iconic form of Shiva facing West. There is an Ardha Mandap and a Mukha mandap, pillared halls leading to the sanctum. There is a shrine of Muruga facing South, towards the Shiva shrine. Since Muruga is believed to have used his weapon, the Vel, to dig the spring, he is seen without his weapon in the shrine, nor his vehicle peacock. The first precinct has the images of Vinayakar, Durga, Dakshinamurthy and Chandikeswara. The shrine of Avudainayagi is seen in the first precinct facing west. There are sculptural depictions of Sundarar on the walls showing him in three different emotions of anger, humiliation and happiness. There is a hall of Nataraja called Adavallan Sabha. There are three temple tanks associated with the temple - Shanmugha Theertham, Gnana Theertham and Brahmatheertham. There are images of Kalabhairavar and Lingothbhavar, which are considered architectural specimens of the Kongu Cholars.

== Culture ==
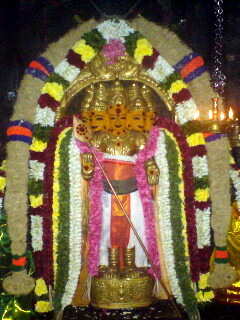
Image of six faced Muruganathswamy

The temple follows Saivite tradition. The temple priests perform the pooja (rituals) during festivals and on a daily basis. The temple rituals are performed four times a day: Ushakalam at 6:00 a.m., Kalasanthi at 8:00 a.m., Uchikalam at 12:00 p.m., and Sayaratchai at 5:00 p.m. Each ritual has three steps: alangaram (decoration), neivethanam (food offering) and deepa aradanai (waving of lamps) for both Thirumuruganatheeswarar and Avudainayagi. There are weekly, monthly and fortnightly rituals performed in the temple.

Brahmotsavam celebrated during the Tamil month of Maasi (February - March) for Sundarar and Mahashivaratri festival being the most prominent. There are other common festivals like Thaipoosam, Annabhishekam, Kanthasashti and Karthigai Deepam celebrated in the temple.

Sundarar, an 8th-century Tamil Saivite poet, venerated Thirumuruganatheeswarar in ten verses in Tevaram, compiled as the Seventh Tirumurai. As the temple is revered in Tevaram, it is classified as Paadal Petra Sthalam, one of the 275 temples that find mention in the Saiva canon. Out of the 275 temples that are revered by the three saints, Sundarar has exclusively visited 25 temples with this temple counting as one of them. Of the five thandavams performed by Shiva in different places, this place is counted as the one where he performed the Brahma Thandavam In modern times, the temple is maintained and administered by the Hindu Religious and Endowment Board of the Government of Tamil Nadu.

== Photogallery ==
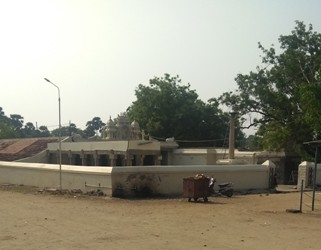
Full view of the temple

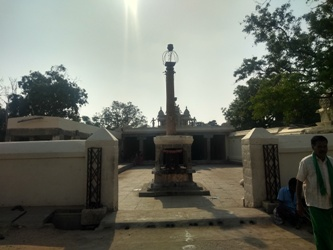
Entrance

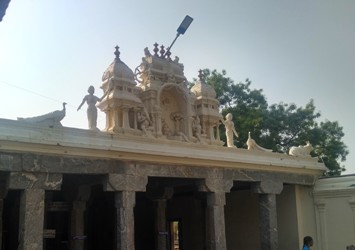
Facade

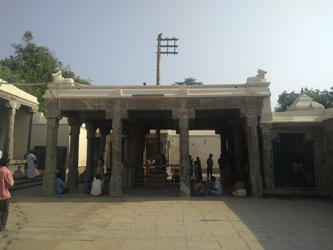
Front mandapa

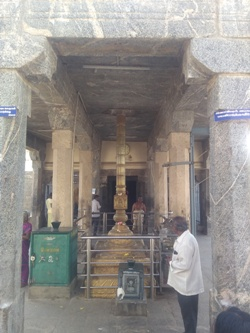
Flagpost

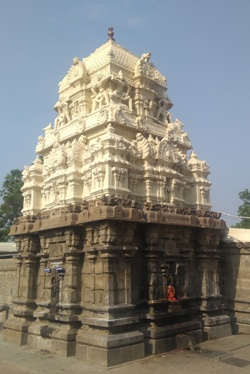
Vimana of the presiding deity

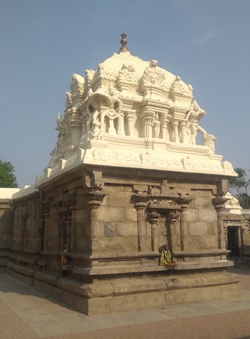
Vimana of the Goddess
