= Ambient air quality criteria =

Ambient air quality criteria, or standards, are concentrations of pollutants in the air, and typically refer to outdoor air. The criteria are specified for a variety of reasons including for the protection of human health, buildings, crops, vegetation, ecosystems, as well as for planning and other purposes. There is no internationally accepted definition but usually "standards" have some legal or enforcement aspect, whereas "guidelines" may not be backed by laws. "Criteria/criterion" can be used as a generic term to cover standards and guidelines.

Various organisations have proposed criteria e.g. WHO, EU, US EPA. These criteria are often similar – but not always, even if they are proposed for the same purpose (e.g. the protection of human health).

== Specifying the criteria ==
It is important for any numerical standard that averaging period, unit, and statistical measure are given (e.g. the 98th percentile of hourly means measured over a calendar year in micrograms per cubic metre (μg/m^{3})). Without these there is no common ground for a given criterion, making it confusing or even meaningless. Criteria can be set in different units (e.g. μg/m^{3}, parts per billion by volume (ppbv), parts per billion by mass (ppb (mass)), parts per million (ppm)) and it is possible to convert between all of these units if the molecular mass of the pollutant and the temperature are known. Different standard temperatures are used throughout the world and so it is important to state the temperature of conversion (if relevant). Most pollutants have ambient criteria in the parts per billion (ppb) or μg/m^{3} range. Some have smaller units (e.g. dioxins are often in picograms/m^{3}); others have larger units (e.g. carbon monoxide (CO) in mg/m^{3}). Particle pollution (e.g. PM_{10}, PM_{1.0}) is specified in units of mass (e.g. μg/m^{3}) and not in units of volume (ppmv).

In the EU, the pollutants and their criteria are specified in Directive 2008/50/EC.

== The criteria ==
Below is a list of available air quality criteria around the world. There is a lot of cross referencing between organizations (e.g. the International Finance Corp (IFC)) that have their own criteria but ultimately, many criteria are based on those specified by the World Health Organization (WHO). It is important when complying with ambient air quality criteria to check the direct reference as well. Not all related caveats/controlling parameters of a criterion can be put in the table, and therefore those specified below are mostly those that most monitoring agencies specify. These agencies also list whether criteria must be monitored in a specific way to fit with compliance measures.

Pollutant	Abbr.	Value	Units	Averaging Period	Statistical Measure	# exceedences	Organisation	Status	Applicability	Notes
Nitrogen dioxide	NO_{2}	40	μg/m^{3}	Annual^{1}	Mean	None	WHO	Guideline	Global	
Nitrogen dioxide	NO_{2}	200	μg/m^{3}	1 hour	Mean	None	WHO	Guideline	Global	
Nitrogen dioxide	NO_{2}	40	μg/m^{3}	Annual	Mean	None	EU	Limit Value	EU Member States	Calendar Year
Nitrogen dioxide	NO_{2}	53	ppb	Annual	Mean	None	US EPA	Legal	United States	Primary and Secondary
Nitrogen dioxide	NO_{2}	100	μg/m^{3}	Annual	Yrly mean of daily	None	SCENR	Legal	Qatar	Calendar Year
Nitrogen dioxide	NO_{2}	40	μg/m^{3}	Annual	Mean	None	Chinese Ministry of Ecology and Environment	Legal	China	
Nitrogen dioxide	NO_{2}	100	μg/m^{3}	Daily	Mean		New Zealand Ministry for the Environment	Guideline	New Zealand	Calendar Year
Nitrogen dioxide	NO_{2}	113	μg/m^{3}	Daily	Daily mean of hourly	None	Japanese Ministry of Environment	Legal	Japan	Quoted as 0.06 ppm
Nitrogen dioxide	NO_{2}	150	μg/m^{3}	Daily	99.7%ile	1 day/yr	SCENR	Legal	Qatar	Calendar Year
Nitrogen dioxide	NO_{2}	80	μg/m^{3}	Daily	Mean	None	Chinese Ministry of Ecology and Environment	Legal	China	
Nitrogen dioxide	NO_{2}	100	ppb	1 hour	98% of 1-hour daily maximum concentrations, averaged over 3 years	None	US EPA	Legal	United States	Primary
Nitrogen dioxide	NO_{2}	40	μg/m^{3}	Annual	Mean	None	India Central Pollution Control Board (CPCB)	Legal	India	Calendar Year
Nitrogen dioxide	NO_{2}	30	μg/m^{3}	Annual	Mean	None	India Central Pollution Control Board(CPCB)	Legal	India - Ecologically sensitive areas	Calendar Year
Nitrogen dioxide	NO_{2}	80	μg/m^{3}	24 hour^{2}	Mean	None	India Central Pollution Control Board (CPCB)	Legal	India	Calendar Year
Nitrogen dioxide	NO_{2}	200	μg/m^{3}	1 hour	99.79%ile	18 hrs/yr	EU	Limit value	EU Member States	Calendar Year
Nitrogen dioxide	NO_{2}	200	μg/m^{3}	1 hour	Mean	9/yr	New Zealand Ministry for the Environment	Legal	New Zealand	Calendar Year
Nitrogen dioxide	NO_{2}	400	μg/m^{3}	1 hour	99.7%ile	26 hrs/yr	SCENR	Legal	Qatar	Calendar Year
Nitrogen dioxide	NO_{2}	200	μg/m^{3}	1 hour	Mean	None	Chinese Ministry of Ecology and Environment	Legal	China	

Pollutant	Abbr.	Value	Units	Averaging Period	Statistical Measure	# exceedences	Organisation	Status	Applicability	Notes
Sulphur dioxide	SO_{2}	75	ppb	1 hour	99% of 1-hour daily maximum concentrations, averaged over 3 years	None	US EPA	Legal	United States*	Primary
Sulphur dioxide	SO_{2}	500	ppb	3 hours	Mean	Once per year	US EPA	Legal	United States	Secondary quoted as 0.5 ppm
Sulphur dioxide	SO_{2}	20	μg/m^{3}	Annual	Mean	None	Chinese Ministry of Ecology and Environment	Legal	China Category 1 Areas	
Sulphur dioxide	SO_{2}	60	μg/m^{3}	Annual	Mean	None	Chinese Ministry of Ecology and Environment	Legal	China Category 2 Areas	
Sulphur dioxide	SO_{2}	50	μg/m^{3}	Daily	Mean	None	Chinese Ministry of Ecology and Environment	Legal	China Category 1 Areas	
Sulphur dioxide	SO_{2}	20	μg/m^{3}	Annual	Mean	None	India Central Pollution Control Board (CPCB)	Legal	India - Ecologically sensitive areas	
Sulphur dioxide	SO_{2}	50	μg/m^{3}	Annual	Mean	None	India Central Pollution Control Board (CPCB)	Legal	India	
Sulphur dioxide	SO_{2}	80	μg/m^{3}	24 hour	Mean	None	India Central Pollution Control Board (CPCB)	Legal	India	
Sulphur dioxide	SO_{2}	150	μg/m^{3}	Daily	Mean	None	Chinese Ministry of Ecology and Environment	Legal	China Category 2 Areas	
Sulphur dioxide	SO_{2}	150	μg/m^{3}	1 hour	Mean	None	Chinese Ministry of Ecology and Environment	Legal	China Category 1 Areas	
Sulphur dioxide	SO_{2}	500	μg/m^{3}	1 hour	Mean	None	Chinese Ministry of Ecology and Environment	Legal	China Category 2 Areas	
Sulphur dioxide	SO_{2}	125	μg/m^{3}	24 hour	Any 24 hour period	None	WHO	Interim Target (IT) 1	Global	Was the guideline in 2000
Sulphur dioxide	SO_{2}	50	μg/m^{3}	24 hour	Any 24 hour period	None	WHO	Interim Target (IT) 2	Global	Calendar Year (1 Jan – 31 Dec)
Sulphur dioxide	SO_{2}	125	μg/m^{3}	24 hour	Any 24 hour mean	None	WHO	Interim Target (IT) 1	Global	
Sulphur dioxide	SO_{2}	50	μg/m^{3}	24 hour	Any 24 hour mean	None	WHO	Interim Target (IT) 2	Global	
Sulphur dioxide	SO_{2}	20	μg/m^{3}	24 hour	Any 24 hour mean	None	WHO	Guideline	Global	
Sulphur dioxide	SO_{2}	500	μg/m^{3}	10 minute	Any 10 minute mean	None	WHO	Guideline	Global	
Sulphur dioxide	SO_{2}	1300	μg/m^{3}	1 hour	99.99%ile	1 hr/year	Ras Laffan	Legal	Qatar	Calendar Year
Sulphur dioxide	SO_{2}	350	μg/m^{3}	1 hour	Mean	9/yr	New Zealand Ministry for the Environment	Legal	New Zealand	
Sulphur dioxide	SO_{2}	570	μg/m^{3}	1 hour	Mean	None	New Zealand Ministry for the Environment	Legal	New Zealand	
Sulphur dioxide	SO_{2}	120	μg/m^{3}	24 hour	Average		New Zealand Ministry for the Environment	Guideline	New Zealand	

Abbr.	Value	Units	Averaging Period	Statistical Measure	# exceedences	Organisation	Status	Applicability	Notes
PM_{10} "Coarse Particulate Matter"	150	μg/m^{3}	24 hour	Average over 3 years	Once per year	US EPA	Legal	United States	Primary and Secondary
PM_{10}	125	μg/m^{3}	24 hour	99th %ile	3 days/yr	WHO	Guideline	Global	
PM_{10}	50	μg/m^{3}	24 hour	Mean	None	WHO	Guideline	Global	
PM_{10}	20	μg/m^{3}	Annual	Mean	None	WHO	Guideline	Global	
PM_{10}	60	μg/m^{3}	Annual	Mean	None	India Central Pollution Control Board (CPCB)	Legal	India	
PM_{10}	10	μg/m^{3}	24 hour	Mean	None	India Central Pollution Control Board (CPCB)	Legal	India	
PM_{10}	50	μg/m^{3}	24 hour	Mean	1/yr	New Zealand Ministry for the Environment	Legal	New Zealand	
PM_{10}	40	μg/m^{3}	Annual	Mean	None	Chinese Ministry of Ecology and Environment	Legal	China Category 1 Areas	
PM_{10}	70	μg/m^{3}	Annual	Mean	None	Chinese Ministry of Ecology and Environment	Legal	China Category 2 Areas	
PM_{10}	50	μg/m^{3}	24 hour	Mean	None	Chinese Ministry of Ecology and Environment	Legal	China Category 1 Areas	
PM_{10}	150	μg/m^{3}	24 hour	Mean	None	Chinese Ministry of Ecology and Environment	Legal	China Category 2 Areas	
PM_{2.5} "Fine Particulate Matter"	35	μg/m^{3}	24 hour	98% averaged over 3 years	None	US EPA	Legal	United States	Primary and Secondary
PM_{2.5}	25	μg/m^{3}	24 hour	Any 24 hr mean	None	WHO	Guideline	Global	
PM_{2.5}	60	μg/m^{3}	24 hour	mean	None	India Central Pollution Control Board (CPCB)	Legal	India	
PM_{2.5}	40	μg/m^{3}	Annual	Mean	None	India Central Pollution Control Board (CPCB)	Legal	Global	
PM_{2.5}	75	μg/m^{3}	24 hour	Any 24 hr mean	None	WHO	Interim target (IT) 1	Global	
PM_{2.5}	50	μg/m^{3}	24 hour	Any 24 hr mean	None	WHO	Interim target (IT) 2	Global	
PM_{2.5}	37.5	μg/m^{3}	24 hour	Any 24 hr mean	None	WHO	Interim target (IT) 3	Global	
PM_{2.5}	12.0	μg/m^{3}	Annual	Annual mean over 3 years	None	US EPA	Legal	United States	Primary
PM_{2.5}	15	μg/m^{3}	Annual	Mean	None	Chinese Ministry of Ecology and Environment	Legal	China Category 1 Areas	
PM_{2.5}	35	μg/m^{3}	Annual	Mean	None	Chinese Ministry of Ecology and Environment	Legal	China Category 2 Areas	
PM_{2.5}	15.0	μg/m^{3}	Annual	Annual mean over 3 years	None	US EPA	Legal	United States	Secondary
PM_{2.5}	10	μg/m^{3}	Annual	Mean	None	WHO	Guideline	Global	
PM_{2.5}	25	μg/m^{3}	24 hour	Mean	None	WHO	Guideline	Global	
PM_{2.5}	25	μg/m^{3}	Annual	Mean	None	WHO	Interim target (IT) 2	Global	
PM_{2.5}	15	μg/m^{3}	Annual	Mean	None	WHO	Interim target (IT) 3	Global	
PM_{2.5}	35	μg/m^{3}	24 hour	Mean	None	Chinese Ministry of Ecology and Environment	Legal	China Category 1 Areas	
PM_{2.5}	75	μg/m^{3}	24 hour	Mean	None	Chinese Ministry of Ecology and Environment	Legal	China Category 2 Areas	

Pollutant	Abbr.	Value	Units	Averaging Period	Statistical Measure	# exceedences	Organisation	Status	Applicability	Notes
Ozone	O_{3}	0.07	ppm	8 hours	Annual 4th highest daily maximum 8-hour concentration, averaged over 3 years	3/yr	US EPA	Legal	United States*	Primary and Secondary
Ozone	O_{3}	100	μg/m^{3}	8 hours	Any 8 hour mean	None	WHO	Guideline	Global	
Ozone	O_{3}	100	μg/m^{3}	8 hours	Mean	None	India Central Pollution Control Board (CPCB)	Guideline	India	
Ozone	O_{3}	180	μg/m^{3}	1 hour	Mean	None	India Central Pollution Control Board (CPCB)	Legal	India	
Ozone	O_{3}	160	μg/m^{3}	8 hours	Any 8 hour mean	None	WHO	Interim target	Global	
Ozone	O_{3}	100	μg/m^{3}	8 hours	Daily maximum 8-hour averaged concentration	None	Chinese Ministry of Ecology and Environment	Legal	China Category 1 Areas	
Ozone	O_{3}	160	μg/m^{3}	8 hours	Daily maximum 8-hour averaged concentration	None	Chinese Ministry of Ecology and Environment	Legal	China Category 2 Areas	
Ozone	O_{3}	160	μg/m^{3}	1 hour	Mean	None	Chinese Ministry of Ecology and Environment	Legal	China Category 1 Areas	
Ozone	O_{3}	200	μg/m^{3}	1 hour	Mean	None	Chinese Ministry of Ecology and Environment	Legal	China Category 2 Areas	
Ozone	O_{3}	235	μg/m^{3}	1 hour	99.9%	8 hrs/yr	SCENR	Legal	Qatar	Calendar Year
Ozone	O_{3}	120	μg/m^{3}	8 hours	99.8%	2x8hrs/yr	SCENR	Legal	Qatar	Calendar Year
Ozone	O_{3}	150	μg/m^{3}	1 hour	Mean	None	New Zealand Ministry for the Environment	Legal	New Zealand	

Pollutant	Abbr.	Value	Units	Averaging Period	Statistical Measure	# exceedences	Organisation	Status	Applicability	Notes
Carbon monoxide	CO	35	ppm	1 hour	Mean	1/yr	US EPA	Legal	United States	Primary
Carbon monoxide	CO	40	mg/m^{3}	1 hour	Maximum	None	SCENR	Legal	Qatar	Calendar Year
Carbon monoxide	CO	4	mg/m^{3}	1 hour	Maximum	None	India Central Pollution Control Board (CPCB)	Legal	India	
Carbon monoxide	CO	2	mg/m^{3}	8 hour	Maximum	None	India Central Pollution Control Board (CPCB)	Legal	India	
Carbon monoxide	CO	10	mg/m^{3}	1 hour	Mean	None	Chinese Ministry of Ecology and Environment	Legal	China	
Carbon monoxide	CO	9	ppm	8 hour	Mean	1/yr	US EPA	Legal	United States	Primary
Carbon monoxide	CO	10	mg/m^{3}	8 hour	Maximum	None	SCENR	Legal	Qatar	Calendar Year
Carbon monoxide	CO	10	mg/m^{3}	8 hour	Mean	1/yr	New Zealand Ministry for the Environment	Legal	New Zealand	
Carbon monoxide	CO	30	mg/m^{3}	1 hour	Mean	1/yr	New Zealand Ministry for the Environment	Legal	New Zealand	
Carbon monoxide	CO	4	mg/m^{3}	24 hour	Mean	None	Chinese Ministry of Ecology and Environment	Legal	China	

Pollutant	Abbr.	Value	Units	Averaging Period	Statistical Measure	# exceedences	Organisation	Status	Applicability	Notes
Lead	Pb	0.15	μg/m^{3}	3 month	Rolling 3 month average	None	US EPA	Legal	United States	Primary and Secondary
Lead	Pb	0.5	μg/m^{3}	Annual	Mean	None	Chinese Ministry of Ecology and Environment	Legal	China	
Lead	Pb	0.5	μg/m^{3}	Annual	Mean	None	India Central Pollution Control Board (CPCB)	Legal	India	
Lead	Pb	1	μg/m^{3}	24 hours	Mean	None	India Central Pollution Control Board (CPCB)	Legal	India	
Lead	Pb	1	μg/m^{3}	Season	Mean	None	Chinese Ministry of Ecology and Environment	Legal	China	

== Footnotes ==
[1] Annual arithmetic mean of a minimum of 104 measurements in a year at a particular site, such as taken twice weekly as uniform 24-hour samples.

[2] 24/8/1 hourly monitored values, as applicable, shall be complied with 98% of the time, they may exceed the limits but not on two consecutive days of monitoring.

== See also ==
- National Ambient Air Quality Objectives for Canada
