= Tamil Nadu Preventive Detention Act, 1982 =

1982 Indian law

Tamil Nadu Legislature
- Long title: An Act to provide for preventive detention of bio-medical waste offenders, bootleggers, cyber law offenders, drug offenders, economic offenders, goondas, immoral traffic offenders and slum-grabbers for preventing their dangerous activities pre-judicial to the maintenance of public order.
- Citation: Tamil Nadu Act 14 of 1982
- Territorial extent: Whole of Tamil Nadu
- Passed by: Tamil Nadu Legislative Assembly
- Passed: 18 February 1982
- Passed by: Tamil Nadu Legislative Council
- Passed: 1 March 1982
- Assented to by: President
- Assented to: 12 March 1982
- Effective: 5 January 1982

Legislative history

Initiating chamber: Tamil Nadu Legislative Assembly
- Bill title: Tamil Nadu Prevention of Dangerous Activities of Boot-leggers, Drug-Offenders, Goondas, Immoral Traffic Offenders and Slum-grabbers Bill, 1982
- Bill citation: L. A. Bill No. 7 of 1982
- Introduced by: C. Ponnaiyan, Minister for Co-operation and Law
- Introduced: 18 February 1982

Revising chamber: Tamil Nadu Legislative Council
- Passed: 1 March 1982

Repeals
- Tamil Nadu Prevention of Dangerous Activities of Boot-leggers, Drug-Offenders, Goondas, Immoral Traffic Offenders and Slum-grabbers Ordinance, 1982 (Tamil Nadu Ordinance 1 of 1982)

Amended by
- 1. Tamil Nadu Prevention of Dangerous Activities of Bootleggers, Drug-offenders, Goondas, Immoral Traffic Offenders and Slum-grabbers (Amendment) Act, 1986 (52 of 1986); 2. Tamil Nadu Prevention of Dangerous Activities of Bootleggers, Drug-offenders Goondas, Immoral Traffic Offenders and Slum-grabbers (Amendment) Act, 1987 (1 of 1988); 3. Tamil Nadu Prevention of Dangerous Activities of Bootleggers, Drug-offenders, Forest-offenders, Goondas, Immoral Traffic Offenders and Slum-grabbers (Amendment) Act, 2004 (32 of 2004); 4. Tamil Nadu Prevention of Dangerous Activities of Bootleggers, Drug-Offenders, Forest-Offenders, Goondas, Immoral Traffic offenders, Sand-offenders, Slum-Grabbers and Video Pirates (Amendment) Act, 2006 (16 of 2006); 5. Tamil Nadu Prevention of Dangerous Activities of Bootleggers, Drug-offenders, Forest-offenders, Goondas, Immoral Traffic-offenders, Sand-offenders, Slum-grabbers and Video Pirates (Amendment) Act, 2008 (16 of 2008); 6. Tamil Nadu Prevention of Dangerous Activities of Bootleggers, Drug-offenders, Forest-offenders, Goondas, Immoral Traffic Offenders, Sandoffenders, Slum-grabbers and Video Pirates (Amendment ) Act, 2014 (19 of 2014); 7. Tamil Nadu Prevention of Dangerous Activities of Bootleggers, Drug-offenders, Forest-offenders, Goondas, Immoral Traffic Offenders, Sand-offenders, Slum-grabbers and Video Pirates (Second Amendment) Act, 2014 (20 of 2014); 8. Tamil Nadu Prevention of Dangerous Activities of Bootleggers, Cyber law offenders, Drug-offenders, Forest-offenders, Goondas, Immoral Traffic offenders, Sand-offenders, Sexual-offenders, Slum-grabbers and Video Pirates (Amendment) Act, 2022 (39 of 2022); 9. Tamil Nadu Prevention of Dangerous Activities of Bootleggers, Cyber law offenders, Drug offenders, Forest-offenders, Goondas, Immoral Traffic Offenders, Sand-offenders, Sexual-offenders, Slum-grabbers and Video Pirates (Amendment) Act, 2025 (36 of 2025)

Keywords
- Acting in any Manner Prejudicial to the Maintenance of Public Order, Bootlegger, Detention Order, Detenu, Drug-Offender, Goonda, Slum-grabber, Unauthorised Structure
- Status: In force

The Tamil Nadu Preventive Detention Act, 1982 (Note: Till 2025 it was known as The Prevention of Dangerous Activities of Bootleggers, Drug Offenders, Goondas, Immoral Traffic Offenders, Forest Offenders, Sand Offenders, Slum-Grabbers, and Video Pirates Act, 1982), popularly known as the Goondas Act in Tamil Nadu, India and Gundar Sattam in Tamil, is a law for habitual offenders to be detained for a year as a preventive measure.

The act was later amended to include, forest offenders, sand smugglers, cyber criminals and sexual offenders against women. The amended act allows the state to also hold first-time offenders for an offence that may have a potential to disrupt public order.

== Overview ==
The act allows for the imprisonment of certain categories of criminals whose actions have the potential to disrupt public order, and it can be used against repeat offenders. The primary requirement for issuing a detention order under the Act in respect of 'goonda' is repeated conduct, attempt to commit, or abetment of commission of offenses listed in the description of the term "goonda".

The authorities can imprison someone under this act. This act is enforced by the Commissioner of Police in metropolitan areas and the District Collector in rural regions. A person can be arrested under sections 16, 17, 22, 45 of the Indian Penal Code only if they are believed of committing a crime or are a member of a criminal organization. An advisory panel consisting of judges will decide whether the arrest is correct. Even after the panel made a decision, a person can approach the High Court and seek relief. The offender may face up to 12 months in prison if the Goondas act is decided on him. If the state administration so wishes, he can be released ahead of time. If a person is arrested under this Act and is released with certain conditions and if he/she violates the conditions, he/she will be sentenced to up to two years in prison.

If a person arrested under this Act wishes to show that he is innocent, his lawyer cannot advocate on his behalf. Only members of his family may approach the appeals panel on his behalf. Once a person is detained, his or her family has 12 days to request for his or her release, first to the state for evaluation, then to the advisory panel established under Section 10 of the Act. The panel will be made up of a High Court judge, a retired judge, and a session judge. The panel will conduct an investigation and report to the court on whether the act imposed on the person concerned is right. Action will be taken against the person based on the decision.

According to the state, the amended act allows the state to also hold first-time offenders for an offence that may have a potential to disrupt public order. The government based its decision on a 2011 Madras High Court judgement that said that "even a single crime allows imprisonment of a person as a Goonda, under the Act.

== History ==
The Act was enacted during the administration of former Chief Minister of Tamil Nadu M. G. Ramachandran (MGR). He intended to enact a strict law to prosecute and punish anyone who unlawfully produces, sells, disrupts public order, instigates violence, or indulges in smuggling and embezzlement. After consultations with government officials, ministers, and others, MGR came up with a law. The complete name of the act is the Prevention of Dangerous Activities of Bootleggers, Drug Offenders, Goondas, Immoral Traffic Offenders, Forest Offenders, Sand Offenders, Slum-Grabbers, and Video Pirates Act until 2025. In short, it was known as the Prevention of Violence Act'. The law is called the "Goondas Act" by simply calling the perpetrators "Goondas".

=== Forest offenders ===
In 1988, the term “forest offenders” was included and defined to cover individuals who were involved in the destruction of the environment.

=== Video pirates ===
In 2004, the Government of Tamil Nadu led by the Chief Minister J. Jayalalithaa amended the term "video pirates" to include individuals who commit, try to commit, or aid and abet the commission of copyright infringement offenses in connection to a cinematograph film or a record incorporating any part of the sound track connected with the movie to be punishable under the Copyright Act, 1957; the theft and sale of films on compact discs (CDs) was brought under the Act.

=== Sand offenders ===
In 2006, the "sand offenders" were also included in this act by the Dravida Munnetra Kazhagam government to punish criminal syndicates in the sand-supply business.

=== Cyber criminals and sexual offenders ===
The administration introduced two bills on August 11, 2014 to put cyber criminals and sexual offenders against women under the Act. Individuals who are “preparing to publish offensive content that threaten public order on any social media,” and those who commit offences specified in Chapter XI of the Information Technology Act, 2000, can be held under the Act by the state police. In July 2019, the Act was amended to cover sexual offences and cyber crimes.

== See also ==
- Puducherry Prevention of Anti-Social Activities Act

== Bibliography ==
- Liu, Kung-Chung (17 July 2019). Annotated Leading Copyright Cases in Major Asian Jurisdictions. City University of Hong Kong Press. ISBN 978-962-937-380-1.
