= Pariyerum Perumal (soundtrack) =

Tamil-language film soundtrack

Soundtrack album by Santhosh Narayanan
- Released: 9 September 2018
- Recorded: 2018
- Genre: Feature film soundtrack
- Length: 27:34
- Language: Tamil
- Label: Think Music
- Producer: Santhosh Narayanan

Santhosh Narayanan chronology
Kaala (2018)	Pariyerum Perumal (2018)	Vada Chennai (2018)

Singles from Pariyerum Perumal
- 1. "Karuppi" Released: 4 March 2018; 2. "Engum Pugazh Thuvanga" Released: 18 May 2018

Pariyerum Perumal is the soundtrack album to the 2018 film of the same name directed by Mari Selvaraj in his directorial debut and produced by Pa. Ranjith's Neelam Productions starring Kathir and Anandhi. The film featured music composed by Santhosh Narayanan and featured six songs with lyrics written by Vivek, Perumal Vaathiyar, Chinnasamidaasan and Selvaraj himself. Preceded by two singles—"Karuppi" and "Engum Pugazh Thuvanga"—the album was released through Think Music on 9 September 2018.

== Background ==
Pa. Ranjith's norm composer Santhosh Narayanan, was assigned to compose the soundtrack and score of Pariyerum Perumal. Selvaraj noted that Santhosh had not composed for a film set in the Southern region of Tamil Nadu, and with his involvement, he treated the film in his own way resulting in "[the] story of Southern Tamil Nadu is now universal". The music was described as a mixture of Tamil folk and conventional music, and Santhosh had particularly chosen singers and musicians from the Tirunelveli–Thoothukudi regions, where the film was set.

While composing the song "Karuppi", Santhosh had emphasized on the "wailing sounds" mixing Oppari and electronic sounds. Although Narayanan recorded multiple versions for the film, with different singers, his version was retained due to Selvaraj's suggestion. The song "Vaa Rayil Vida Polaamaa" was sung by Super Singer Junior season 5 title winner Prithika.

== Release ==
The first single "Karuppi" was released on 4 March 2018, and the second single "Engum Pugazh Thuvanga" was released on 18 May 2018. The album was launched by Dhanush on 9 September 2018.

== Reception ==
Karthik Srinivasan of Milliblog said, "After Kaala, Pariyerum Perumal is the second whopper from Santhosh Narayanan this year!" V. Lakshmi of The Times of India had stated "In the recent past, Santhosh Narayanan has come up with albums that are the voice to the suppressed. This album falls in that category as well." Ashameera Aiyappan of Cinema Express wrote "Santhosh Narayanan delivers a sucker punch of an album that is so raw, the emotion seeps through your flesh." Baradwaj Rangan of Film Companion South complimented "Santhosh Narayanan's work is magnificent".

Anjana Shekar of The News Minute wrote "The film’s soundtrack by Santhosh Narayanan is easily his most important work till date. Listening to Santhosh sing 'Karuppi' or 'Naan Yaar' on the big screen gets under your skin, quite literally. He has also retained the raw quality in these folk songs without adulterating it with a composer’s version, which is indeed a refreshing, most-enjoyable change." Kirubhakar Purushothaman of India Today wrote "The songs by Santhosh Narayanan give another dimension to the film. From folk numbers to trippy racy numbers, the music composer has given it all for this film. It is doubtful if Pariyerum Perumal would have been as intense as it is now, without SaNa's music."

Srinivasa Ramanujam of The Hindu wrote "Composer Santhosh Narayanan transports you to the milieu with his bag of tunes — while 'Potta Kaatil' stands out for its melody, the existential 'Naan Yaar' plays around with colour, much like how director Pa Ranjith (the producer for this film) envisioned the climax of his recent Rajinikanth-starrer Kaala."

== Track listing ==
No.	Title	Lyrics	Singer(s)	Length
1.	"Karuppi"	Vivek, Mari Selvaraj	Santhosh Narayanan, Dr. S. C. Chandilya	4:18
2.	"Vanakkam Vanakkamunga"	Perumal Vaathiyar	Puliyankulam Velmayil, Puliyankulam Kannan	3:07
3.	"Pottakattil Poovaasam"	Vivek	Yogi Sekar, Fareedha	6:39
4.	"Engum Pugazh Thuvanga"	Chinnasamidaasan, Mari Selvaraj	Anthony Daasan, Mariappan	4:29
5.	"Vaa Rayil Vida Polaama"	Vivek	Prithika	3:44
6.	"Naan Yaar"	Mari Selvaraj	Santhosh Narayanan, Vijay Narain, Ananthu	5:18
Total length:				27:34

== Personnel ==
Credits adapted from Think Music:

- All music composed, produced, arranged and programmed by – Santhosh Narayanan
- Piano, synths, rhythm and potti – Santhosh Narayanan
- Nadaswaram – Kariyapatti Sekar
- Thavil – Pichamani, Ganapathy
- Pambai – Raja
- Urumi – Dayanandham, Murugesan
- Bass – Naveen
- Percussions – Ganapathy, Venkat
- Acoustic guitar – Telfie
- Electric guitar – Keba Jeremiah
- Additional rhythms – RK Sundar
- Recording studios – Future Tense Studios, Krimson Avenue Studios, Resound India
- Recording engineers – Santhosh Narayanan, Sai Shravanam, RK Sundar, Abin Pushpakaran, Dinesh Antony
- Mixed by – Sai Shravanam at AM Studios and RK Sundar at Future Tense Studios, Chennai
- Mastered by – Alex Gordon at Abbey Road Studios, London
- Musicians co-ordinator – Meenakshi Santhosh, Andrew T. Mackay

== Accolades ==
Award	Date of ceremony (Note: Date is linked to the article about the awards held that year, wherever possible.)	Category	Recipient(s)	Result	Ref.
Ananda Vikatan Cinema Awards	5 January 2019	Best Music Director	Santhosh Narayanan (Note: Also awarded for Kaala and Vada Chennai)	Won	
Norway Tamil Film Festival Awards	25–28 April 2019	Best Music Director	Santhosh Narayanan (Note: Also awarded for Vada Chennai)	Won	
South Indian International Movie Awards	15–16 August 2019	Best Music Director	Santhosh Narayanan	Nominated	
South Indian International Movie Awards	15–16 August 2019	Best Lyricist	Vivek – ("Pottakattil Poovaasam")	Nominated	
Filmfare Awards South	21 December 2019	Best Music Director – Tamil	Santhosh Narayanan	Nominated	
Filmfare Awards South	21 December 2019	Best Lyricist – Tamil	Vivek – ("Pottakattil Poovaasam")	Nominated	
