= Sigai =

2019 film by Jagadeesan Subu

- Release poster
- Directed by: Jagadeesan Subu
- Written by: Jagadeesan Subu; M. K. Mani; Aravindhan
- Produced by: NPKS Logu
- Starring: Kathir
- Cinematography: Navin Kumar
- Edited by: Anucharan
- Music by: Ron Ethan Yohann
- Production company: Divine Studios
- Distributed by: ZEE5
- Release dates: 15 January 2017 (All Lights India International Film Festival); 9 January 2019 (ZEE5)
- Running time: 101 minutes
- Country: India
- Language: Tamil

Sigai (transl. Hair) is a 2017 Indian Tamil-language crime thriller film directed by Jagadeesan Subu in his debut. The film stars Kathir in the lead role while Meera Nair, Raj Bharath, Riythvika, and Mayilsamy are in supporting roles. It follows a transgender man whose possessiveness and close association with his friend are the causes of a major accident that kills two innocent people. The man feels highly dejected when his friend looks for companionship with other women, ignoring his emotions. The film, shot between 2015 and 2016, premiered at the 2017 All Lights India International Film Festival and was released on ZEE5 on 9 January 2019.

== Plot ==
The film is set in Anna Nagar and depicts events that happen one day. It opens with a pimp named Prasath (Raj Barath) handling prostitutes with his partner Chetta (Rajesh Sharma). Prasath shows special care for a prostitute named Buvana (Riythvika) and treats her better than the others.

One night, a customer named Santhosh (Mal Maruga) calls Prasath and asks him for a girl. Prasath asks Chetta, who suggests Nirmala alias Nimmi (Meera Nair) to be sent. She lives as a prostitute without the knowledge of her family, which consists of her mother and siblings, who are scared of her. She is taken to Santhosh with the help of Subramani (Mayilsamy), a cab driver who drops her off at Santhosh's place.

The next day, Prasath and Chetta discover that Nimmi has not gone to other customers and that Santhosh was her last customer. They get puzzled, as Santosh states that she left and her phone is not answered. They then investigate different places with the help of Subramani. They soon reach Santhosh's house, where they find him dead with no clue about Nimmi. Later, Chetta leaves Prasath and Subramani, and they both go to KFC for further investigation and are left clueless. They return to Santhosh's house, where they find Nimmi dead. Prasath is left alone after seeing Chetta get caught and later he sees a man crying on his roof. He follows the man, who reveals what happened.

The man reveals himself to be Mathivanan (Kathir), who is an NRI and comes to India each year to meet Santhosh. One night, Santhosh invites Nimmi to get laid. Nimmi seduces Mathi and says that it is alright for her to manage people while eating. Nimmi waits in the room for them, while Santhosh is drunk and allows Mathi to go first. Mathi tells Nimmi to leave, and she remains stubborn and mocks him. He accidentally kills her and cries out in guilt, later revealing that he is a transgender person who wanted Santhosh to share his feelings. He hides her body in the fridge and tells the now-recovered Santosh that she had left earlier. Later, Santosh discovers her body and gets to know Mathi's true colours. He too mocks Mathi, ignoring his feelings towards him and is accidentally killed by him. He hides due to the arrival of Prasath at that moment and cries out in pain that he faced as transgender. He completes narrating what happened that night, shares his pain, and leaves the place back in the present.

A few months later, we can see Chetta being a much stricter pimp, providing strict guidelines to his girls. Prasath stops being a pimp after listening to Subramani's words and marrying Buvana, and Mathi is shown living a new life as a transgender person by growing a lot of hair.

The film ends by showing a few transgender people.

== Cast ==
- Kathir as Mathivanan
- Meera Nair as Nirmala (Nimmi)
- Raj Bharath as Prasath
- Riythvika as Buvana
- Mayilsamy as Subramani
- Rajesh Sharma as Chetta
- Mal Maruga as Santhosh
- Brila Boss as Prem
- Vishalini as Prem's spouse
- Muthukumar as Manager
- Kani Venkatesh as suspect

== Production ==
The film began production in 2015, and wrapped in late 2016, with filming taking place mostly in Chennai. It is the directorial debut of Jagadeesan Subu. Kathir signed the film even before his breakthrough Pariyerum Perumal (2018), and Jagadeesan revealed that they were actually supposed to collaborate on a different script but changed course after Jagadeesan told Kathir about this alternate script. Jagadeesan finalised Meera Nair as the lead actress after considering numerous others, feeling her "eyes were the clinching factor" for him. Kathir revealed he had to endure hardships while applying makeup to look like a transgender. For the sake of realism, the makers avoided the use of prosthetics.

== Release and reception ==
Sigai premiered at the 2017 All Lights India International Film Festival. It was released on ZEE5 on 9 January 2019, bypassing theatrical release, becoming the first Tamil film to directly release on the streaming service. S. Subhakeerthana of The Indian Express wrote, "The problem with Sigai is that it feels like two different films weaved into one, though Jagadeesan Subu seems clear about what he was going to present to the audience". Gopinath Rajendran of Cinema Express also criticised the tonal shifts in the story, as did Baradwaj Rangan when writing for Film Companion. Santosh Mathevan of News Today wrote that Sigai was "just another flick in that long list that humiliates people belonging to the third gender but ironically tags itself as the one speaking for them".
