= Karki (film) =

Indian drama film

- Theatrical release poster
- Directed by: Pavithran
- Screenplay by: Pavithran
- Based on: Pariyerum Perumal by Mari Selvaraj
- Produced by: Prakash Palani
- Starring: Jai Prakash Reddy; Meenakshi Dinesh
- Cinematography: Rishikesh
- Edited by: Sri Crazy Mindz
- Music by: Arjun Janya; Abhay Anand
- Production company: Third Eye Media
- Release date: 20 September 2024
- Country: India
- Language: Kannada

Karki is a 2024 Indian Kannada-language romantic drama film directed by Pavithran and produced by Prakash Palani under the banner of Third Eye Media. It is a remake of the 2018 Tamil film Pariyerum Perumal. It features Jai Prakash Reddy and Meenakshi Dinesh (in her Kannada debut) in lead roles, alongside Sadhu Kokila, Bala Rajwadi, Yathiraj, and Mimicry Gopi in supporting roles.

== Cast ==
- Jai Prakash Reddy as Muthathi Mutturaj (Muttu)
- Meenakshi Dinesh as Jyothi Lakshmi (Jo)
- Sadhu Kokila
- Bala Rajwadi
- Yathiraj
- Mimicry Gopi

== Production ==
Initially, the team considered a local Kannada director, but ultimately chose Pavithran, marking his debut in the Kannada film industry. Jai Prakash Reddy who is known for his performance in Whatsapp Love (2019), was cast alongside Meenakshi Dinesh, who is known for her works in Journey of Love 18+ and Iratta marks her debut in Kannada cinema. Kyasinakere village was chosen as the filming location for scenes featuring dogs, after the crew identified it as a suitable site with local dog owners. The film was shot across various locations in Karnataka, including Shimoga, Davanagere, Hubli, Bangarapet, Kolar Gold Fields, Bangalore, Channapatna, Kolar, and Bagalkote. Additionally, scenes featuring dogs were filmed in Tirunelveli, Tamil Nadu. The cinematography was by Rishikesh, while the editing was handled by Sri Crazy Mindz.

== Soundtrack ==
Karki

Soundtrack album by Arjun Janya, Abhay Anand
- Released: 2024
- Genre: Feature film soundtrack
- Length: 20:57
- Language: Kannada
- Label: Saregama

Arjun Janya chronology
| Krishnam Pranaya Sakhi (2024) | Karki (2024) |
External audio
- Karki – Jukebox on YouTube

The soundtrack was composed by Arjun Janya and Abhay Anand.

All lyrics are written by Kaviraj.

Track listing
| No. | Title | Music | Singer(s) | Length |
|---|---|---|---|---|
| 1. | "Karki Karki" | Arjun Janya | Nishaan Rai | 3:02 |
| 2. | "Dun Dun Nakkadi" | Arjun Janya | Aniruddha Sastry | 3:29 |
| 3. | "Kannale (Duet Song)" | Arjun Janya | Shreenidhi G Shastry, Ananya Bhat | 3:28 |
| 4. | "Naan Yaar" | Arjun Janya | Aniruddha Sastry | 4:15 |
| 5. | "Vale Jummki" | Abhay Anand | Aniruddha Sastry, Mookuthi Murugan, Parthiban | 3:57 |
| 6. | "Hidithu Kaiyanu" | Arjun Janya | Aarna Shetty | 2:46 |
| Total length: | | | | 20:57 |

== Release ==
The film was released theatrically on 20 September 2024.

== Reception ==
Sridevi S of The Times of India rated the film three out of five stars and wrote that "The movie is a powerful, level-headed drama about a youth from an oppressed class making way for himself in a casteist society. If you haven’t seen the original, do not miss this film that skilfully mirrors the harsh realities of the society we live in." Shashiprasad SM of Times Now gave it three out of five stars and wrote, "Despite its flaws, Karki succeeds in delivering an important message, leaving viewers to reflect on the realities of caste discrimination and resilience."

A. Sharadhaa of The New Indian Express rated the film three out of five stars and wrote that "Karki emerges as a thoughtful adaptation that captures essential social themes while keeping the audience invested in the characters' journeys. It invites viewers to reflect on the harsh realities of caste discrimination while celebrating resilience and aspiration." A critic from Udayavani gave the film a positive review.
