= Vaazhai =

2024 film directed by Mari Selvaraj

- Theatrical release poster
- Directed by: Mari Selvaraj
- Written by: Mari Selvaraj
- Produced by: Sajith Sivanandan; K. Madhavan; Divya Mari Selvaraj; Mari Selvaraj; Dhilip Subbarayan
- Starring: Ponvel M. Raghul R. Kalaiyarasan; Nikhila Vimal
- Cinematography: Theni Eswar
- Edited by: Suriya Pradhaman
- Music by: Santhosh Narayanan
- Production companies: Disney+ Hotstar; Navvi Studios; Farmer's Master Plan Production
- Distributed by: Red Giant Movies
- Release date: 23 August 2024
- Running time: 136 minutes
- Country: India
- Language: Tamil

Vaazhai (Tamil pronunciation: [ʋaːɻaɪ] transl. Banana) is a 2024 Indian Tamil-language children's drama film written, directed and co-produced by Mari Selvaraj. It is produced by Disney+ Hotstar, Navvi Studios and Farmer's Master Plan Production. The film stars Ponvel M., Raghul R. (both debutants), Kalaiyarasan and Nikhila Vimal, with J. Satish Kumar, Dhivya Duraisamy, Karnan Janaki and Nivedita Rajappan in supporting roles. It revolves around Sivanaindhan, who works at a banana plantation while going to school; however, he hates working there.

The film, the first production of Navvi Studios, was officially announced in November 2022. Principal photography commenced the same month. It was shot for the most part in Thoothukudi, and wrapped by January 2023. The film has music composed by Santhosh Narayanan, cinematography handled by Theni Eswar and editing by Suriya Pradhaman.

Vaazhai was released in theatres worldwide on 23 August 2024. Upon release, it received positive reviews from critics and became a commercial success, grossing approximately ₹45 crore (US$4.7 million) against an estimated budget of ₹5 crore (US$520,000).

== Plot ==
In mid-1998, in the village of Karungulam, southern Tamil Nadu, the primary occupation is harvesting raw banana bunches and transporting them to lorries, for which a meager payment of ₹1 (equivalent to ₹5.00 or 5.2¢ US in 2023) per bunch is made. Sivanaindhan and Sekar are two adolescent friends. Sivanaindhan has a crush on his social science teacher, Poongodi, and even swears a false oath when caught with her lost handkerchief. Despite being a bright student, Sivanaindhan is forced to lug banana bunches during weekends due to poverty. He and Sekar, fearing the labour-intensive work, sought excuses to avoid it. However, Sivanaindhan's mother insists he works to repay the advance credit she had received, pledging her son's labour.

Vembu, Sivanaindhan's elder sister, is in love with Kani, a socialistic thinker who, along with a few villagers, demands a hike of ₹1 (equivalent to ₹5.00 or 5.2¢ US in 2023) extra per bunch through their village broker, Muthuraj. The trader reluctantly agrees to avoid a work stoppage. One weekend, Sivanaindhan escapes from work by faking a thorn injury, leaving him to take care of their cow. However, he abandons the cow and goes with Poonkodi to the rice mill. Upon returning, he finds the cow to have entered Muthuraj's field, leading to a confrontation. Kani intervenes, losing his job as a loadman and being forced to lug bunches like the other villagers. The humiliation and his mother's tears prompt Sivanaindhan to promise that he would work without hesitation during the ten-day half-yearly exam holidays to pay off debts and never utter a lie ever again.

A few months pass, and Sivanaindhan's family struggles to bear the increasing debts. As his mother's declining health prevents her from working temporarily, she sells their cow, much to Sivanaindhan's grief, who is now forced to work on school days to fill in for her. Meanwhile, he gets selected for a dance performance at the upcoming school's annual day function and is called to practice the following Saturday. However, he can't confront his mother and unwillingly goes for lugging with his sister, Vembu, but he convinces her and escapes from the crowded lorry to attend the dance practice on an empty stomach. Starving, he attempts to pluck bananas from a nearby field on his way home only to be caught by the field's caretaker and brutally thrashed, but, he somehow escapes. Left with no choice, he heads home where he is caught by his mother and runs away to avoid beatings for having lied, fainting near the pond.

When he wakes up, he finds the entire village in mourning, with around nineteen corpses, eventually discovering those of Vembu, Kani, Sekar, and Muthuraj, who died in a lorry accident while transporting bananas. The trader is blamed for the tragedy, as he refused to provide proper transportation and forced the labourers to climb onto the overloaded lorry. Sivanaindhan, weakened and hungry, sneaks into his kitchen to eat but is discovered by his mother. Afraid, the famished Sivanaindhan runs away and passes out in a banana field, while his mother laments herself for starving him and almost sending him to his death on that truck along with her daughter.

The screen cuts to an archived newspaper article from Dinathanthi, reporting the death of twenty plantain farm workers near Srivaikundam, who were buried alive under bananas loaded in the lorry when it overturned. A note follows, dedicating the movie to those victims, as told by a survivor.

== Cast ==
- Ponvel M. as Sivanaindhan
- Raghul R. as Sekar
- Kalaiyarasan as Kani
- Nikhila Vimal as Poongodi
- Karnan Janaki as Sivanaindhan and Vembu's mother
- Dhivya Duraisamy as Vembu
- Pathmen as Muthuraj
- J. Satish Kumar as a trader
- Nivedita Rajappan as a teacher
- Puliyankulam D Kannan as a villager
- Gomathi as Sekar's mother
- Aadukalam Stella as a teacher

== Production ==
The film, announced on 21 November 2022, was produced by director Mari Selvaraj and his wife Divya Mari Selvaraj under their home banner Navvi Studios. Ponvel. M and Raghul. R made their acting debut, while established actors like Nikhila Vimal, J. Satish Kumar, Kalaiyarasan, Dhivya Duraisamy, Karnan Janaki and Nivedita Rajappan were cast in pivotal supporting roles. Principal photography began on 21 November 2022 in Thoothukudi, and wrapped on 11 January 2023.

== Music ==
The soundtrack and film score is composed by Santhosh Narayanan, in his third collaboration with Mari Selvaraj after Pariyerum Perumal and Karnan.The first single titled, "Thenkizhakku" was released on 18 July 2024. The second single "Oru Oorula Raja" was released on 29 July 2024. The third single "Otha Satti Soru" was released on 5 August 2024. The fourth single "Paadhavathi" was released on 10 August 2024. The entire soundtrack album was released on 22 August 2024. The audio rights for the film were secured by Think Music.

Track listing
No.	Title	Lyrics	Singer(s)	Length
1.	"Thenkizhakku"	Yugabharathi	Dhee	4:22
2.	"Oru Oorula Raja"	Mari Selvaraj	Santhosh Narayanan	4:02
3.	"Otha Satti Soru"	Vivek	Kapil Kapilan; Aditya Ravindran	3:41
4.	"Paadhavathi"	Mari Selvaraj	Jayamoorthy; Meenakshi Ilayaraja	5:05
5.	"Vaazhai's Surprise"	Mari Selvaraj	Santhosh Narayanan	1:33
Total length:				18:43

== Release ==
=== Theatrical ===
Vaazhai was released worldwide on 23 August 2024 in theatres. The distribution rights for Tamil Nadu were acquired by Red Giant Movies.

=== Home media ===
The film began streaming on Disney+ Hotstar from 11 October 2024 in Tamil, alongside Hindi, Telugu, Malayalam, Kannada, Bengali, and Marathi languages.

== Reception ==
=== Critical reception ===
The film received positive reviews from critics.

Janani K of India Today gave 4/5 stars and wrote "Director Mari Selvaraj, on several occasions, called Vaazhai his best film. [...] Mari is absolutely right, as Vaazhai is his career-best film and a perfect answer to the trolls that targeted him." Haricharan Pudipeddi of The South First gave 4/5 stars and wrote, "Vaazhai, which is easily Mari Selvaraj's best work, is a piece of art and there are no second thoughts about it". Avinash Ramachandran of The Indian Express gave 4/5 stars and wrote, "It tells the reason why some people are more purposeful than others. And while telling and showing all of this, Vaazhai is also brilliant cinema... and that is probably who Mari Selvaraj is. Anusha Sundar of OTTplay gave 3.5/5 stars and wrote, "Vaazhai is a delightful deviation that Mari Selvaraj took after making his previous films. Vaazhai brims with innocence and has a childlike quality of coming in terms with pain. High on quality, and beautifully emoted characters, Vaazhai easily becomes one of the best Tamil films to have come out in 2024, and stands tall in Mari Selvaraj's filmography".

In his review for The Hindu, Bhuvanesh Chandar praised the film as a masterpiece writing, "Everything in Mari's world of Vaazhai is meticulously-crafted from life", and felt Ponvel gave a "performance worthy of national glory". Latha Srinivasan in her review for Hindustan Times praised the direction of Mari Selvaraj writing, "Writer and director Mari Selvaraj's repertoire of work is so haunting that every film of is a piece of art that transcends the silverscreen. [...] The themes of caste, capitalism, exploitation and oppression are woven into the story very powerfully and subtly and that's what is most striking in this film. Mari Selvaraj has given us a heart-wrenching film that is also heartwarming and that's a big achievement for any director."

Writing for the Deccan Herald, Guruprasad D N rated the film 4/5 praising Mari Selvaraj's direction and the performances of the lead actors, particularly Ponvel. Describing the film as Mari Selvaraj's most tender and deeply affecting tale yet, Narayani M of Cinema Express gave a positive review mentioning, "The banana plant is renowned for its all-round utility, from stem to leaf. Yet, when one plant dies after fruiting, its offshoots continue to grow—a symbol of prosperity. Vaazhai beautifully captures the inherent irony of how the underprivileged are doomed to be exploited and traumatised even at the hands of a symbol of prosperity."

=== Box office ===
Vaazhai, made on an estimated budget of ₹5 crore (US$520,000), grossed approximately ₹35 crore (US$3.7 million) and was considered a sleeper hit, given the low budget and lesser known cast.

== Plagiarism allegations ==
A week after the film's release, author Cho Dharman accused Mari Selvaraj of plagiarising "Vazhaiyadi", a short story he had written 10 years before. Mari, rather than fighting back, posted a tweet calling attention to the short story, and thanked Dharman.
