= Sathru (2019 film) =

2019 film by Naveen Nanjundan

- Poster
- Directed by: Naveen Nanjundan
- Written by: Naveen Nanjundan
- Screenplay by: Naveen Nanjundan
- Produced by: Raghukumar; Raja Ratnam; Sritharan
- Starring: Kathir; Srushti Dange
- Cinematography: Mahesh Muthuswami
- Edited by: Prasanna GK
- Music by: Amresh Ganesh; Surya Prasadh R
- Production company: RT Infinity Deal
- Release date: 8 March 2019
- Running time: 117 minutes
- Country: India
- Language: Tamil

Sathru (transl. Enemy) is a 2019 Indian Tamil language action thriller film written and directed by Naveen Nanjundan on his directorial debut. The film stars Kathir and Srushti Dange, with Laguparan, Ponvannan, Pawan, Neelima Rani, G. Marimuthu, Suja Varunee, and Rishi in supporting roles. The film released on 8 March 2019.

== Plot ==
Kathiresan is an honest and rightful cop. His passion for his work and honesty leads to him being brutal to the culprits. His way of inquiry is way too harsh. This causes his colleagues and higher officials to show faces to him. Kathir is from a middle-class family. His father is an ex-military official. His elder brother Viswa is an army man. He lives with his sister-in-law, father, and niece Shruthi. Kathir has a girlfriend named Darshini, who is his sister-in-law's cousin.

Here comes Prabhakaran, who is a spoiled youth. He hails from Madurai and lives with his friends. In order to earn money, they kidnap young kids and demand a ransom from their parents. Once, they kidnap the son of a rich man named Mahendran. Mahendran personally knows the commissioner, and the case goes to the police. Together, with the rich kid, they kidnap a poor man's child, as well. A ransom of five crores is demanded. The ACP delays it, which causes the poor kid to die. Fearing his own son's life, Mahendran gives five crores. Then, Prabha asks Kathir to give the money to some lady on the train. As that, Kathir sees a lady with her son and gives her the money. He gets onto the next compartment. The guy slaps the lady and escapes with the money. Kathir is led to a room in a flat and kills the guy, Kutty. He saves the money and the kid. The department suspends Kathir, as he was told not to shoot the culprit.

The kidnappers, angered by the death of their friend, vow revenge. They hit Sruthi while she comes back from school. The whole family goes to the hospital, and the guys come there. They were unable to kill the rest as Kathir is present. One of them later calls Kathir and threatens him. His father tells him to kill all of them in a day's time. The clock starts ticking at 9 PM. Kathir later finds the guy and kills him afterwards. Another man named Sekar enters and flees after seeing Kathir and his friends, Arun and Parthiban. He informs Prabha and is soon killed by them. When they go to Prabha's residence, they find nothing. Prabha still tries to kill everyone, including his sister-in-law's parents, but Kathir saves them. Later, when he brings them to the police station for safety, he sees the small boy from the train. He realizes that he is a pickpocket and that the lady is not his mother. He finds her name as Kasturi and brings the boy along to find her. Her flat is also empty.

Kathir's father is killed at his house by Prabha. Kathir hides this from his family and asks them to stay at the hospital. Meanwhile, two men enter the hospital but find the police and Viswa there. Arun is later killed on the road. Later, Parthiban's son is kidnapped. They track that this is Prabha's gang. When talking with Prabha, they realize that their car is stalled at a police checking. Despite the information, the police loses them. A chase ensues, but they discover that the boy is not in their car.

Kasturi has the boy and hides in a beach house. Prabha and his other friend Guna are there. Kathir tells the pickpocket boy to keep watch. Later, he and Guna get caught. Viswa is lured into the car park and gets stabbed but survives. Kathir later escapes with the pickpocket boy's help. His sister-in-law is later asked to go buy medicines by the disguised Kasturi. When Sister-in-law is outside, Prabha comes to stab her but is unsuccessful. Kathir chases them and kills them all, including Kasturi.

== Cast ==
- Kathir as Sub-inspector Kathiresan
- Srushti Dange as Darshini
- Laguparan as Prabhakaran
- Ponvannan as Kathiresan's father
- Pawan as Viswa, Kathiresan's brother
- Neelima Rani as Kathiresan's sister-in-law
- G. Marimuthu as S. Sankara Lingam IPS
- Suja Varunee as Kasthuri
- Rishi as Mahendran
- Mimer Karthi Keyan as Prabhakaran's friend
- Chavi Sharma as Shruti
- Aruvi Balaji as Kutty, Prabhakaran's friend
- S. Gurumoorthy as Prabhakaran's friend
- N. Sattu as Prabhakaran's friend
- Bava Lakshmanan as Tuck Shop Owner
- B. Rohan as Pickpocket
- Ajithesh as Rahul
- Alisa Chopra

== Production ==
Following the success of Pariyerum Perumal, actor Kathir decided to shift his acting career into a commercial flick for the first time by signing to act in an action thriller film directed by debutant Naveen Nanjundan in around 2018 with the actor agreed to have portrayed the role of a police cop for the first time in his career through this project. The film was extensively shot in Chennai, Puducherry and Hyderabad.

== Release ==
The film was earlier planned for a theatrical release in around February 2019 but was postponed to have its release on 1 March 2019 due to tight race at the box office. The film was later confirmed to hit the screens on 8 March 2019.

== Soundtrack ==
The songs were composed by Amresh Ganesh. The background score was composed by debutant Surya Prasadh R

Sathru

Soundtrack album by Amresh Ganesh
- Released: 2019
- Genre: Feature film soundtrack
- Language: Tamil
- Label: Triple V Records
- Producer: 14:11

Amresh Ganesh chronology
Pottu (2019)	Sathru (2019)	Okate Life (2019)

No.	Title	Singer(s)	Length
1.	"Acham Neeki"	Amresh Ganesh	3:37
2.	"Kadhalikka Ingu Neramillai"	Sharath Santhosh	3:51
3.	"Neram Indha Neram"	Tippu, Suchithra	3:43
Total length:			14:11
