= Maamannan =

2023 film directed by Mari Selvaraj

- Theatrical release poster
- Directed by: Mari Selvaraj
- Written by: Mari Selvaraj
- Produced by: Udhayanidhi Stalin
- Starring: Vadivelu: Fahadh Faasil; Keerthy Suresh; Udhayanidhi Stalin
- Cinematography: Theni Eswar
- Edited by: Selva R. K.
- Music by: A. R. Rahman
- Production company: Red Giant Movies
- Release date: 29 June 2023
- Running time: 155 minutes
- Country: India
- Language: Tamil
- Box office: ₹52 crore

Maamannan (transl. Emperor) (Note: Also the title character.) is a 2023 Indian Tamil-language political drama film written and directed by Mari Selvaraj, and produced by Udhayanidhi Stalin via Red Giant Movies. The film stars Vadivelu as the title character, along with Fahadh Faasil, Keerthy Suresh, and Udhayanidhi in his final acting credit.

The film was officially announced in March 2022. Filming commenced later that month and wrapped in September 2022, taking place mainly in Salem district. The music was composed by A. R. Rahman, while the cinematography and editing were handled by Theni Eswar and Selva R. K., respectively.

Maamannan was released in theatres on 29 June 2023. The film received mixed-to-positive reviews from critics and became a commercial success.

== Plot ==
Maamannan is an MLA belonging to the Dalit community, who rose up the ranks from being a cadre of the Samathuva Samooganeedhi Makkal Kazhagam (SSMK) in Salem district, Tamil Nadu. Maamannan's son Athiveeran alias "Veera", is an Adimurai practitioner who stopped talking to his father owing to emotional and physical trauma caused by a casteist attack from members of the local dominant community in his childhood. Rathnavelu is the SSMK district secretary for Salem and younger son of late ex-minister Sundaram, from a dominant community. Rathnavelu had fought a hard fight after his father's death, using all means available to reach the position of district secretary, despite not holding a public office. Rathnavelu's brash, aggressive behaviour often develops loggerheads with Maamannan.

Three months before elections, Rathnavelu's men destroy a free coaching centre run by Veera's friends and his love interest Leela because it was affecting the business of a private coaching centre run by Rathnavelu's elder brother Shanmugavel in his father's name. In retaliation, Veera and his friends destroy Rathnavelu's coaching centre. Rathnavelu realises that the issue might damage him inside the party and out, so he invites Maamannan and Veera to sort out this issue without further violence.

At the meeting, Veera notices that Maamannan is standing while everyone else including Rathnavelu are sitting in chairs. Veera asks his father to sit down, where Rathnavelu remarks that Maamannan will never sit down in his house and that has been the tradition since forever. Veera continuously demands that Maamannan sits down, Rathnavelu gets enraged where he slaps Veera and pushes Maamannan who intervened when his son is hit. An enraged Veera kicks down Rathnavelu in retaliation.

Rathnavelu directs his men to beat up Maamannan and Veera where he runs to fetch his gun, but his wife Jyothi locks him inside the room to prevent further chaos. Veera beats up all the men who attack him and his father, and they leave. Rathnavelu plans to counter-attack and kill Maamannan and Veeran but is ordered to stay put by the Chief Minister Ka. Sindhanai Rajan. Unable to attack Maamannan and Veera, Rathnavelu unleashes his dogs into the pigpen of Veera, resulting in the death of all except one pig. Veera, Maamannan, and their friends and family are deeply hurt by this symbolic cruelty.

Sindhanai Rajan orders Rathnavelu and Maamannan to come meet him at the Party HQ in Chennai. He asks Rathnavel to apologise to Maamannan or forgo the party membership. Rathnavel quits from the party and joins the main opposite party MSSMK (Marumalarchi Samathuva Samooganeedhi Makkal Kazhagam) with some of his followers. The sacking of a district secretary of the ruling party creates shock in the political scenario. Rathnavel nominates a candidate of his choice to compete against Maamannan, who is campaigning for a third term as an MLA. He even fields Jyothi in his place for another constituency to fully direct his efforts to defeat Maamannan.

Rathnavel challenges Maamannan that now that his support is not there, Maamannan will surely fail in the upcoming elections. A tight battle occurs during election campaign wherein Rathnavel tries to rally the support of all dominant castes against Maamannan. Rathnavel even kills a caste association head to create sympathy wave in favour of his candidate. All his plans succeed to some extent, but the youth of the constituency rebel against Rathnavel dictating whom each street should vote for. In the ensuing elections, Maamannan wins by a big margin and Rathnavel is left humbled and failed. The SSMK is re-elected to power, and Maamannan is made the Speaker of the Legislative Assembly. Veera and Leela continue to be engaged in their grassroot level social welfare activities.

== Cast ==
- Vadivelu as Sa. Maamannan
- Fahadh Faasil as Rathnavelu
- Keerthy Suresh as Leela
- Udhayanidhi Stalin as Maa. Athiveeran "Veera"
  - S. Surya as young Veera
- Lal as Chief Minister Ka. Sindhanai Rajan
- Azhagam Perumal as Salem Sundaram
- Vijayakumar as the Leader of the Opposition
- Sunil Reddy as Shanmugavel
- Geetha Kailasam as Veerayi
- Raveena Ravi as Jyothi Rathnavelu
- TNB Kathir as Sangam Thalaivar
- Pathmen as Rathnavelu's henchmen
- Ramakrishnan as Ramakrishnan, Veera's friend
- Madhankumar Dhakshinamoorthy as A. Madhankumar
- Aasaan P. Selvaraj as Adimurai Aasaan
- Meena Saravanan as Leela's mother
- Ganesh Rangan as Leela's father
- Praveen as Veera's friend
- A. R. Rahman as himself in the song "Jigu Jigu Rail"

== Production ==
In July 2021, Udhayanidhi Stalin was reported to do a film with Mari Selvaraj, and it would be his last before he quit acting. In September, reports claimed that Fahadh Faasil was going to be seen in a crucial role in the film. In November, Vadivelu was also reported to act in the film, making it a comeback for him to the film industry after 5 years. In January 2022, Keerthy Suresh was reported to join the film as the lead actress. On 4 March 2022, Udhayanidhi's Red Giant Movies announced the film titled Maamannan, which confirmed the aforementioned cast and director. In May 2022, Udhayanidhi confirmed Maamannan would be his final film as an actor, after which he intended to concentrate on his political career.

Principal photography began in March 2022 in Salem district; the first schedule ended the same month. The second schedule commenced in May, with Fahadh joining the team. In June, Udhayanidhi announced that the second schedule had ended. By August 2022, the final schedule was underway in Chennai. In September 2022, Keerthy completed shooting her portions. Later the same month, principal photography wrapped. While the film was primarily shot at Salem, some parts were filmed at Jarugumalai, a small hill station at the southern part of the district.

In March 2023, Vadivelu started dubbing for his portions. Post-release, Mari stated that, given Vadivelu's reputation as a comedian, he hoped Maamannan would not remind viewers of the actor's comedic performances: "He suffers, he cries, he gets beaten up, he gets neglected and trampled, he's isolated… His reactions, however, make us laugh [...] In Maamannan, he suffers like he always does, but I've changed how we react to it".

== Music ==
The music is composed by A. R. Rahman, in his first collaboration with Mari Selvaraj. The audio launch was held in Chennai on 1 June 2023.

== Release ==
=== Theatrical ===
Maamannan released theatrically on 29 June 2023. As Udhayanidhi announced Maamannan would be his final film as an actor, Rama Saravanan, producer of Angel directed by K. S. Adhiyaman, sought an interim injunction on the film's release through the Madras High Court unless Udhayanidhi co-operated with him to complete Angel, which was nearly complete but had been in stagnation for years due to the COVID-19 pandemic and Udhayanidhi later becoming a minister. However, the court refused to grant interim injunction to Maamannan because of "non-joinder of the proper parties".

=== Home media ===
The post theatrical streaming rights of the film were by acquired Netflix. The film has its television premiere on Star Vijay on 23 October 2023, during Vijayadashami, and on Kalaignar TV it premiered on 14 April 2024. The film began streaming on Netflix from 27 July 2023.

== Reception ==
=== Critical response ===
Maamannan received mixed-to-positive reviews from critics. On the review aggregator website Rotten Tomatoes, 60% of 5 critics' reviews are positive, with an average rating of 5.5/10.

Gopinath Rajendran of The Hindu said "Maamannan certainly has its heart in the right place and touches upon several important topics. But it's still an underwhelming political drama that's saved by its lead cast's brilliant performances." Bharathy Singaravel of The News Minute gave the film 4 out of 5 and said "After Pariyerum Perumal and Karnan, director Mari Selvaraj is back with yet another film that will redefine how Kollywood talks about caste." Manigandan KR of The South First gave 3.5 out of 5 stars and said "Vadivelu and Fahadh Faasil put up an exceptional show; barring some minor issues, the movie leaves a mark on audiences." M Suganth of The Times of India gave the film 3 out of 5 and said "An okayish, but hardly potent sociopolitical drama."

Kirubhakar Purushothaman of The Indian Express gave the film 2.5 out of 5 and said "Maamannan is, perhaps, the weakest film of Mari Selvaraj despite the director being unabashedly open about his political affiliations." Janaki K of India Today gave the film 2.5 out of 5 and said "Director Mari Selvaraj's Maamannan, starring Vadivelu, Udhayanidhi Stalin, Fahadh Faasil and Keerthy Suresh, is a film that exposes the social injustice in society. While the film has some solid performances, the story does not have enough meat." Ananda Vikatan rated the film 46 out of 100. Vinu A. of Samakalika Malayalam Vaarika stated that the film can be seen as proof of the growing strength of films that reflect the socio-political and cultural realities of Tamil Nadu.

=== Box office ===
Maamannan grossed ₹6 crore (equivalent to ₹6.4 crore or US$680,000 in 2026) worldwide on its opening day. It ended its theatrical run with ₹52 crore (equivalent to ₹55 crore or US$5.9 million in 2026).
