= Vada Chennai (soundtrack) =

2018 soundtrack album by Santhosh Narayanan

- Soundtrack cover

Soundtrack album by Santhosh Narayanan
- Released: 23 September 2018
- Recorded: 2017–2018
- Genre: Feature film soundtrack
- Length: 40:47
- Language: Tamil
- Labels: Wunderbar Studios; Divo
- Producer: Santhosh Narayanan

Santhosh Narayanan chronology
Pariyerum Perumal (2018)	Vada Chennai (2018)	A1 (2019)

Vada Chennai is the soundtrack album for the 2018 action crime film of the same name directed by Vetrimaaran, starring Dhanush in the lead role. The film featured music composed by Santhosh Narayanan in his maiden collaboration with Vetrimaaran. Vada Chennai also marks the 25th film of Narayanan as a composer in his career. The album in its entirety was released on 23 September 2018 to positive response from critics and audiences. At the 12th Ananda Vikatan Cinema Awards held in Chennai, Santhosh received an award for Best Music Director also for his work in Kaala and Pariyerum Perumal.

== Development ==
The film was initially announced with Vetrimaaran's regular collaborator G. V. Prakash Kumar being brought on board. However, he was ousted from the project due to Dhanush's fallout with Prakash Kumar in the past and also due to Prakash's acting commitments. In late 2017, when Santhosh Narayanan signed for Rajinikanth's Kaala directed by Pa. Ranjith, which is also produced by Dhanush, he suggested Santhosh's name to Vetrimaaran and eventually announced him as the film's composer. Soon, Santhosh started recording the tracks for Vada Chennai while also composing for Kaala, and work on the entire soundtrack album was completed within June 2018. Since the film is based on the life of people revolving in North Chennai, Santhosh recorded the tracks with the influence of gaana (a popular music in North Chennai) and roped in gaana singers for the album. However, one song titled "Kaarkuzhal Kadavaiye" and "Ennadi Maayavi Nee" were melodic numbers which were included in the album to unify listeners; the latter featured a flute interlude. In an interview with Baradwaj Rangan of Film Companion South, he mentioned the themes in the song as a tribute to late M. S. Viswanathan, whom Santhosh had admired.

== Release ==
The makers announced that the entire soundtrack of Vada Chennai will be released on 23 September 2018, without launching any singles from the album. The music rights were acquired by Wunderbar Studios, a subsidiary of Dhanush's production company Wunderbar Films, along with Divo. The tracklist was released on 21 September 2018, which features eleven songs composed by Santhosh Narayanan with three instrumentals. The lyrics were written by Gana Bala, Vivek, Rokesh, Arivu, Dholak Jagan and Sindhai Rev. Ravi. An album preview was released on 22 September, in which composer Santhosh Narayanan, described about the album in a live interaction with fans streamed on various social media handles. The songs were released directly through the internet and in streaming platforms such as Saavn, JioMusic and Gaana.

== Reception ==
The soundtrack received positive reviews from critics. Within 3 days of its release, the soundtrack topped the iTunes charts, and also streamed above 5,00,000 times on Saavn. Sharanya CR from The Times of India called it as a "brilliant stuff by Santhosh, who gives a peek into the film with his incredible music". A reviewer from The News Minute called the soundtrack as an "exciting mix of genres". Behindwoods reviewed the album stating that, "Santhosh Narayanan retains the flavor conveyed in the title of the film!" and rated with 3 out of 5. Surendhar MK of Firstpost rated the album 3.5 out of 5 stars, and called the soundtrack as "earthy" and "liberating" which "brims with rooted, heart-rending tunes and explores majestic themes". Archana Nathan of Scroll.in praised the soundtrack album as it "offers rich tributes to Madras gaana".

Ashameera Aiyyapan of Cinema Express described Vada Chennai's soundtrack in two parts with one being the gaana-infused folk numbers and the other being "the melodies which had a trademark touch of Santhosh [Narayanan]". She further added that the composer "captured the cultural exuberance of North Chennai in the former, while balancing the melodies that consist of an eclectic mosaic of sounds in the latter" and it was combined to get a "holistic picture of the film as well as the works of the composer". Karthik Srinivasan of Milliblog called that "Santhosh Narayanan hits a new high".

== Track listing ==
No.	Title	Lyrics	Singers	Length
1.	"Sandhanatha"	Gana Bala	Ka Ka Balachander, Gana Bala	4:50
2.	"Goindhammavala"	Rokesh	Dhanush	4:38
3.	"Kaarkuzhal Kadavaaiye"	Vivek	Santhosh Narayanan, Sriram Parthasarathy, Pradeep Kumar, Ananthu, Vijaynarain	5:12
4.	"Maadila Nikkura Maankutty"	Gana Bala	Gana Bala, Dhee	4:46
5.	"Ennadi Maayavi Nee"	Vivek	Sid Sriram	4:11
6.	"Epadiyamma"	Sindhai Rev. Ravi	Sindhai Rev. Ravi	4:13
7.	"Maathiya Seraiyile"	Arivu	Arivu	2:17
8.	"Alangaara Pandhal"	Dholak Jegan	Dholak Jegan	3:01
9.	"King of the Sea"	–	Instrumental	3:48
10.	"VadaChennai Theme"	–	Instrumental	2:45
Total length:				40:47

== Background score ==
Vada Chennai

Soundtrack album by Santhosh Narayanan
- Released: 16 November 2018
- Recorded: 2017–2018
- Genre: Feature film soundtrack
- Length: 26:08
- Language: Tamil
- Labels: Wunderbar Studios; Divo
- Producer: Santhosh Narayanan

The original film score composed by Santhosh Narayanan was released on 16 November 2018. It featured thirteen instrumentals, plus an additional track titled "Patta Patti" written and performed by Arivu.

No.	Title	Length
1.	"Patta Patti" (Written and performed by Arivu)	3:07
2.	"Central Jail Gangs"	2:55
3.	"Chandra's Love"	0:31
4.	"Rajan"	0:58
5.	"Rajan – The Legend"	1:23
6.	"Death of a Legend"	1:39
7.	"Chandra's Revenge"	1:22
8.	"Accidental Murder"	1:58
9.	"Double Cross"	1:30
10.	"It Begins"	1:00
11.	"Murder Instincts"	2:10
12.	"Out of the Equation"	0:34
13.	"Viswasam"	4:01
14.	"Rivalry"	2:55
Total length:		26:08

== Album credits ==
Credits adapted from Wunderbar Studios

=== Producer(s) ===
Santhosh Narayanan

=== Songwriter(s) ===
- Santhosh Narayanan (Composer, Arranger)
- Gana Bala, Vivek, Rokesh, Arivu, Sindhai Rev. Ravi, Dholak Jagan (Lyrics)

=== Performer(s) ===
Santhosh Narayanan, Gana Bala, Dhanush, Ka Ka Balachander, Sriram Parthasarathy, Pradeep Kumar, Sid Sriram, Dhee, Arivu, Sindhai Rev. Ravi, Dholak Jagan, Ananthu

=== Musicians ===
- Piano, Keys, Synths, Accordions – Santhosh Narayanan
- Acoustic Guitars – Pradeep Kumar, Telfie
- Trumpets, Trombones, Flugelhorn – Martin Vijay
- Bass – Naveen
- Ganjira, Tabla, Dholak, Percussions – Ganapathy
- Bongos, Potti, Vibraphone – Sundar RK
- Harmonium – Sean Roldan
- Flute – Vishnu Vijay
- Percussions, Drum Kits and Highs – David Joseph
- Rhythms arrangement and programming – Sundar RK
- Strings – Macedonian Symphonic Orchestra (Arranged by Collins Rajendran)
- Chorus – Vetri Maaran, Tony Britto, Chinna, Dinesh Antony
- Live Sounds – Ganapthy, Dinesh Antony, Santhosh Narayanan

=== Sound Engineers ===
- Future Tense Studios – Santhosh Narayanan, Sundar RK, Dinesh Anthony
- AM Studios – S. Sivakumar (Chief sound engineer), Kannan Ganpat, Pradeep Menon, Krishnan Subramaniyan, Manoj Raman
- Prism Studios – Dinesh Anthony

=== Production ===
- Mixed by – S. Sivakumar (AM Studios), Santhosh Narayanan, R. K. Sundar (Future Tense Studios)
- Mastered by – Alex Gordon (Abbey Road Studios, London)
- Mastering co-ordinator – Andrew T. Mackay
- Recording management – Meenakshi Santhosh
