= Jarugumalai =

Region situated in south India

Coordinates: 11.6130186°N 78.1878733°E

Jarugumalai is a region situated in the Eastern Ghats of the southern Indian state of Tamil Nadu, within the Salem District. The area is home to two tribal villages, Melur and Keelur, located about 3,000 feet above sea level. These villages are part of the Kuralnatham panchayat and have a combined population of over 1,200 people.

== Infrastructure and Facilities ==
=== Education ===
The district administration has established a Panchayat Union Middle School, providing education from 1st to 8th standard, for the benefit of the students in the village.

=== Public Distribution System ===
In 2023, a ration shop was opened to cater to the needs of the local population.

=== Utilities ===
Though electricity, drinking water, and primary education facilities are available, the villages of Melur and Keelur still lack medical facilities. Electricity only reached Jarugumalai after 60 years of Indian independence, marking a significant milestone for the region.

=== Road Connectivity ===
In 2021, a new road was constructed from the foothills to the top of the hill, greatly improving accessibility for the residents.

== In popular culture ==
Jarugumalai gained some attention when scenes from the Tamil movie Maamannan, starring Udhayanidhi Stalin, were filmed on the newly constructed hill road.

== Natural Features ==
The Kannimar Stream originates from the northern side of Jarugumalai, flowing through the Skandasramam Murugan Temple and eventually reaching Kumaragiri Lake
