= Ennodu Vilayadu =

2017 Indian Tamil thriller film

- Theatrical release poster
- Directed by: Arun Krishnaswami
- Written by: Arun Krishnaswami
- Produced by: Sridhar Krishnaswami; Narendran Kandasamy; Reji K. Sivamangalam
- Starring: Bharath; Kathir; Chandini Tamilarasan; Sanchita Shetty
- Cinematography: Yuva
- Edited by: Gopi Krishna
- Music by: A. Moses; Sudharshan M. Kumar
- Production companies: Toronto Reels & Reyan Studios
- Release date: 17 February 2017
- Running time: 110 minutes
- Country: India
- Language: Tamil

Ennodu Vilayadu (transl. Play with Me) is a 2017 Indian Tamil-language action thriller film written and directed by Arun Krishnaswami. The film stars Bharath, Kathir, Sanchita Shetty and Chandini Tamilarasan, with Radha Ravi and Yog Japee in supporting roles. Featuring music composed by newcomer Moses and Sudharshan M. Kumar, Ennodu Vilayadu was released on 17 February 2017 to negative reviews.

== Plot ==
The film opens, creating some expectations as we meet Vikram (Bharath), who works for a construction company and is in heavy debts as he is a horse punter who loses because of fixing by the big guns. He meets Minnie (Chandini Tamilarasan), and it is love at first sight. On the other hand, Sridhar (Kathir) lands in Chennai and goes to stay at a house recommended by a friend where, to his surprise, he finds that it’s a girl Inba (Sanchita Shetty). Forty five lakhs to retrieve her house from a bank loan. Vikram plans a getaway with fifty lakhs of bribe money that horse owner Nagulan (Radha Ravi) pays to another owner Sharma (Yog Japee), to fix a race. The money lands in Sridhar's car, and this leads to a collision of all the characters, and what happens next is the rest of the screenplay.

== Cast ==
- Bharath as Vikram
- Kathir as Sridhar
- Chandini Tamilarasan as Minnie
- Sanchita Shetty as Inba
- Radha Ravi as Nagulan
- Yog Japee as Sharma
- Arjai
- Gadam Kishan
- Jagan
- Aathma Patrick as Teja
- Pradeep K Vijayan as Special appearance

== Production ==
The project was launched in early 2015, with an ensemble cast of Bharath, Kathir, Chandini Tamilarasan and Sanchita Shetty announced to feature in Arun Krishnaswami's directorial debut Ennodu Vilayadu. Arun revealed that the idea for his first film had arisen during his visits to Guindy Race Course during horse races. He subsequently began to study the details of horse racing, including the practice and culture of the sport, to develop the story. The film began production in Pondicherry during April 2015, with Sanchita filming scenes with rats during the first schedule. Scenes were thereafter also shot in Chennai and Mysore, with only a few sequences shot featuring both Kathir and Bharath in the same scene. Scenes involving horse racing were predominantly shot in Mysore, owing to the city's popular horse racing scene. Bharath finished filming for his scenes in the film by September 2015, and revealed that he would portray a "happy-go-lucky" character. After further scenes were shot in Bangalore, post-production works began during November 2015 and an initial release date of September 2016 was announced by the makers. The film was delayed for over a year as it waited for an apt release date.

== Soundtrack ==
Ennodu Vilayadu

Soundtrack album by A. Moses Sudharshan M. Kumar
- Released: 9 November 2016
- Recorded: 2015–2016
- Genre: Feature film soundtrack
- Label: Muzik 247

A. Moses Sudharshan M. Kumar chronology
Burma (2014)	Ennodu Vilayadu (2016)

The film has two composers, Sudharshan M. Kumar and A. Moses, with the latter making his debut as a music composer in the Tamil film industry. The soundtrack was released on 9 November 2016.

Track List

No.	Title	Lyrics	Music	Singers	Length
1.	"Ennodu Nee Vilayaadu"	Sarathy	Sudharshan M. Kumar	Naresh Iyer	4:26
2.	"Kaalai Theneer"	Kadhirmozhi	A. Moses	Haricharan, Gowry Lekshmi	3:30
3.	"Yaarai Yaaridam"	Sarathy	Sudharshan M. Kumar	Shweta Mohan, Sudharshan M. Kumar	3:48
4.	"Vidiyaa Vidiyaa"	Viveka	A. Moses	Vijay Prakash, B. Mac	4:12
5.	"Liftum Kooda"	Sarathy	A. Moses	Deepak, B. Mac	1:16
6.	"Soodhu Nadakura Neram"	Arunraja Kamaraj	Sudharshan M. Kumar	Ramya NSK, Sudharshan M. Kumar	3:31
7.	"Enakaanavaa"	Kadhirmozhi	A. Moses	Haricharan	3:33
8.	"Ennodu Vilayadu (Theme)"	—	Sudharshan M. Kumar	Sudharshan M. Kumar	1:44

== Release ==
In late January 2017, the team finalised a release date of 24 February 2017 and began promotions, though the rescheduling of Raghava Lawrence's Motta Shiva Ketta Shiva (2017) from 17 to 24 February, meant that the makers of Ennodu Vilayadu chose to prepone the release by a week. The New Indian Express gave the film a mixed review citing that "it slacks momentum when required" and that "the film would have been a riveting thriller, if only it had more punch and fizz with the second part spruced up a bit". However, the reviewer added "in 106 minutes of viewing time, Ennodu Vilayadu is a promising work from a debutant maker". A critic from The Times of India also gave the film a mixed review and stated "the writing isn't forceful enough and the film spends too much time on inane romantic tracks" which "drain the film of mood and rob its energy". Deccan Chronicle stated the film "doesn't live up to expectations" and that the film "had all the potential to become an interesting thriller had the director Arun Krishnasway concentrated on the core theme and made it crisper". Another reviewer from Indiaglitz.com called the film "mundane" and stated "writer-director Arun Krishnaswamy, after choosing a fairly good idea for a plot, has hampered it with a wayward screenplay". The reviewer added, "a film in this genre can escape if it is fast paced or thrilling, but this one is neither".
