= Kaala (soundtrack) =

- Soundtrack album cover

Soundtrack album by Santhosh Narayanan
- Released: 9 May 2018
- Recorded: 2017–2018
- Studios: Resound India, Chennai; Future Tense studios, Chennai; Stadium Studios, London; Krimson Avenue Studios, Chennai; Purple Haze Studios, Mumbai; Rocsho Records, Malaysia
- Genre: Feature film soundtrack
- Length: 37:43
- Language: Tamil
- Label: Wunderbar Studios
- Producer: Santhosh Narayanan

Santhosh Narayanan chronology
Server Sundaram (2017)	Kaala (2018)	Mercury (2018)

Singles from Kaala
- 1. "Semma Weightu" Released: 1 May 2018

Kaala is the soundtrack album for the film of the same name, starring Rajinikanth in the title role, produced by Dhanush and directed by Pa. Ranjith. The album composed by Santhosh Narayanan, in his second collaboration with Rajinikanth and Ranjith after Kabali (2016), features nine songs written by Kabilan, Umadevi, Arunraja Kamaraj, Arivu, Dopeadelicz, Logan and Roshan Jamrock.

The album was initially slated to release in March 2018, but the launch was postponed due to the standoff between Nadigar Sangam and Digital Service Providers on the increase of Virtual Print Fee charges along with the 2018 Tamil Nadu protests for Kaveri water sharing issue. The audio launch event, took place on 9 May 2018, at YMCA College of Physical Education, Chennai where Rajinikanth, Dhanush, Santhosh Narayanan, Pa. Ranjith, the film's cast and crew and others attended the event.

The album received positive critical reception from music listeners, and audiences, praising Santhosh for a different kind of blend of mixtures and genres in the soundtrack album.

== Development ==
Santhosh Narayanan, signed in to compose the film's soundtrack in 2017, collaborating with Rajinikanth and Pa. Ranjith once again after Kabali (2016), and also its second collaboration with the former. Recording of the songs, which commenced in September 2017, was completed within the end of 2018. The soundtrack album, consists of nine songs in the Tamil version. The album consists of one a cappella song, only in the Tamil version of the soundtrack album. The lyrics for the songs were written by Kabilan, Umadevi, Arunraja Kamaraj, Arivu and rap portions were penned by Logan and Roshan Jamrock. Dharavi-based street rapper band, Dopeadelicz also contributed to the album, by writing and also performing three songs, apart from playing an important role in the film. Celebrity singers also sung the songs, which included Shankar Mahadevan, and Vijay Prakash. Ananthu, Pradeep Kumar, Dhee also sung the songs for the film, with three of the songs were sung by the former. Malaysian rapper Yogi B rendered one song, which is reported to be the theme music of the film. His rap portions were used in the teaser of the movie, only in Tamil version.

== Marketing ==
The audio rights of the film were secured by Wunderbar Studios, a subsidiary of the production house Wunderbar Films, along with Divo. The official theme music used in the film's teaser was released on 7 March 2018. Later in April 2018, Dhanush, the producer of the film posted on his official Twitter account, stating that the film's audio will release on 9 May 2018.

On 1 May 2018, the makers released the first single track from the film, titled as "Semma Weightu" in all streaming platforms and on YouTube. The song penned by Arunraja Kamaraj, with Hariharasudhan, Santhosh Narayanan and Arunraja Kamaraj, crooning the vocals, with Dope Daddy, Stony Psyko, MC Mawali, a part of the Dopeadelicz band, rendering the rap versions. The official lyric video of the song crossed 2 million views, within 24 hours of its release.

An album preview was released on 7 May 2018 on YouTube where director Pa. Ranjith, and Santhosh Narayanan, shared their views by expressing their opinion about working for the film's soundtrack. The tracklist was released on 8 May 2018.

== Release ==
The grand audio launch event of the film took place, on 9 May 2018, at YMCA College of Physical Education, Nandanam, Chennai, where Rajinikanth, director Pa. Ranjith, composer Santhosh Narayanan, Dhanush, Aishwaryaa R. Dhanush and the entire film cast and crew and other celebrities attended the event. The film's album songs were released at 9:00 a.m. in all streaming platforms. Santhosh Narayanan, and his musicians gave a live performance of the songs in the film. The audio launch event was aired on live on Facebook, Twitter and YouTube, and was telecasted live on Airtel TV, a live television streaming portal of Airtel, the film's telecommunication partner. However, it was not aired live on television. The audio launch event was telecasted on Star Vijay on 20 May 2018.

== Reception ==
The soundtrack received positive reviews. Behindwoods rate the album 3 out of 5 stars, stating that "A dynamic album by Santhosh - dominated by tracks with social messages - who weaves his magic with his not-to-miss mass and melody tracks!" Indiaglitz rated it 3 out of 5, and summarised that "Santhosh as a mindful composer understanding the politically charged nature of the tracks, balances composition to match the lyrics and not vice versa. 'Kaala' album has most songs that might fit as easy on a political protest as it does on a dance floor." The Times of India summarised it as "The album of Kaala, in many ways, sounds like an extension of Kabali – be it in terms of soundscape, instrumentation or the heavily-worded lyrics. Listen to the songs with the story and background in mind, and you'll be able to appreciate its nuances better." Scroll.in reviewed it as "Lots of revolutionary spirit and some good tunes". India Today summarised the soundtrack as "blend of genres, and political messages". Firstpost rated it as "Kaala is not an album for those of you who are looking for the usual commercial tracks that uplift Rajinikanth's image. What Santhosh does here is bring together a pool of local talent and an ensemble artist line-up at to give us a very different jukebox. Infused with Thalaivar's style yet crafted for the people, Kaala is slow kill for many. Not your everyday album, that makes you groove or stay hooked, Kaala is the one with thoughtful lyrics and for Tamil rap lovers. Except for the few breezy melodies completely contrasting to Kabali — Santhosh's last outing with the same team." Hindustan Times reviewed it as "Santhosh Narayanan's album evokes a sense of revolution in Rajinikanth's film". The Indian Express reviewed the album as "Experimental and definitely not the material of a full-blown mass film, Kaala's music is a mishmash of genres and instruments that is interesting but leaves us with a mild feeling of being lost."

== Track listing ==
No.	Title	Writer(s)	Singer(s)	Length
1.	"Semma Weightu"	Dopeadelicz, Arunraja Kamaraj, Logan	Hariharasudhan, Santhosh Narayanan, Arunraja Kamaraj	4:57
2.	"Thanga Sela"	Arunraja Kamaraj	Shankar Mahadevan, Pradeep Kumar, Ananthu	4:37
3.	"Katravai Patravai"	Kabilan, Arunraja Kamaraj, Roshan Jamrock	Yogi B, Arunraja Kamaraj, Roshan Jamrock	3:45
4.	"Kannamma"	Uma Devi	Pradeep Kumar, Dhee, Ananthu	4:49
5.	"Kannamma (Acapella)"	Uma Devi	Ananthu	2:54
6.	"Urimayai Meetpom"	Arivu	Vijay Prakash, Ananthu	6:43
7.	"Poraaduvom"	Dopeadelicz, Logan	Dopeadelicz	3:29
8.	"Theruvilakku"	Dopeadelicz, Logan	Dopeadelicz, Muthamil	2:35
9.	"Nikkal Nikkal"	Dopeadelicz, Logan	Dopeadelicz, Vivek, Arunraja Kamaraj	2:44
Total length:				37:43

== Background score ==
The original soundtrack of Kaala features fifteen tracks by Santhosh Narayanan. The theme music "Rain Fight" was released as single on 13 June 2018, and the "Hari Dada Theme" was released as the second single on 29 June 2018. The full background score was released on 13 July 2018.

No.	Title	Length
1.	"Rain Fight"	4:30
2.	"Hari Dada Theme"	6:22
3.	"Patriot"	1:06
4.	"Fond Memories"	0:32
5.	"Selvi"	1:00
6.	"Vengai Mavan"	2:16
7.	"Zarina"	0:57
8.	"Evil Men"	1:22
9.	"Sorrow"	2:18
10.	"Hari Dada"	2:00
11.	"Revolt"	1:17
12.	"Face Off"	0:55
13.	"Kula Deivam"	1:53
14.	"Nilam"	2:33
15.	"Riots"	0:34
Total length:		21:55

== Album credits ==
Credits adapted from CD liner notes

All songs composed, arranged and programmed by Santhosh Narayanan

=== Musician credits ===
- Acoustic Guitars: Keba Jeremiah, Joseph Vijay, Telfie
- Electric Guitars: Jhanu Chanthar, Keba Jeremiah
- Nylon Guitar: Joseph Vijay
- Bass: Naveen, Mani
- Electronic Drums: David Joseph
- Harmonium: Satish Raghunathan
- Flute: Vishnu Vijay
- Trumpets: Louis Dowdeswell
- Shakers: Pradeep Kumar
- Tapes: "4 Idiots" group
- Ethnic Tones: RK Sundar
- Indian Percussions: RK Sundar, Ganapathy, Venkat, David Joseph
- Pianos & Additional Synths: Karthick Devaraj

=== Personnel ===
- Beatbox: Beat Slayer (Dopeadelicz)
- Whistle: Ananthu
- Chorus: Rohith Fernandes, Yogi Sekar, Chinna, Tony Britto, RK Sundar, Santhosh Narayanan
- Additional Vocals: RK Sundar, Rohith Fernandes, Tony Britto, Chinna, Yogi
- Backing Vocals: Ananthu

=== Production ===
- Recorded at
  - Resound India - Chennai
  - Future Tense studios – Chennai
  - Stadium Studios - London, UK
  - Krimson Avenue Studios – Chennai
  - Purple Haze Studios - Mumbai
  - Rocsho Records - Malaysia
- Sound Engineers: Sai Shravanam, RK Sundar, Abin Pushpakaran, Kishore Dharan, Dinesh Antony
- Mixed by Santhosh Narayanan
- Additional Mixes - Sat Richard, Dinesh Antony
- Mixed at
  - AM Studios, Chennai
  - Future Tense Studios, Chennai
- Mastered by Alex Gordon, Simon Young (Abbey Road Studios, London)
- Mastering Co-ordinated by: Andrew T. Mackay
- Musician Coordinator: Meenakshi Santhosh
