= All Lights India International Film Festival =

- Location: Hyderabad, Telangana, India
- Awards: The Golden Frame Award
- Festival date: December 2019; 6 years ago
- Language: International
- Website: aliiff.com

All Lights India International Film festival (ALIIFF) is an annual film festival of India conducted in Hyderabad. It is usually conducted in December every year. The 4th edition was held from Dec 1–4, 2018 at PVR Inorbit Mall, Hyderabad. Popular Malayalam film actor and national award-winning director Balachandra Menon was the festival director of the 2018 edition.

== History ==
The first edition of ALIIFF was held in 2015 in Kochi, Kerala. The second and third editions were held at Ramoji Film City in Hyderabad. The film festival was founded by Sohan Roy, Hollywood director of Indian origin and a media entrepreneur.

ALIIFF is part of the Indywood Film Carnival and has introduced some notable films such as Theeb which later went on to win the Oscar in Foreign Films category in 2015. Popular regional superstars such as Mohanlal, Kamal Hassan and Venkatesh have been patrons of the event in the past. The event is managed by the All Lights Film Society. Nisha Joseph aka Nisha Jose is the artistic director of ALIIFF.

The 2017 edition saw films as part of 6 competitive and 9 non-competitive categories. Every year, the festival awards the Golden Frame Award to the best film.

Veteran Film director and winner of Dadasaheb Phalke Lifetime Achievement Award, Shyam Benegal was the festival director of the 2017 edition.

=== Competition categories ===
- International Competition for Student Short Films
- International Competition for Short Films
- International Competition for Documentary Films
- International Competition for Indian Movies
- International Competition for Debut Director's Films (Features)
- International Competition for Feature Films
- Short Film Corner

=== Out of competition categories ===
- Children Films
- Environmental and Sustainability Films

=== Award categories ===
- Film Critics Circle of India Award for the Best Indian Movie
- NETPAC Award for The Best Asian Cinema
- Best Student Short Film
- Best Short Film
- Best Documentary Film
- Best Indywood Panorama Movie
- Best Debut Director's Film
- Best Feature Film

=== ALIIFF 2015—Golden Frame Award Winners ===
ALIIFF 2015—Golden Frame Award Winners
Category	Name	Director	Country
Golden Frame Award for Best Short Film	I Exist	Radhika Prasadhi & Vivek Raju	India
Honorable Mention Award (Short Film)	Till Jail Do Us Apart	Mariana & Joserro Emmanuelli	Puerto
Honorable Mention Award (Short Film)	Symmetry	Ruben Van Leer	Netherlands
1968	You're Human Like the Rest of Them	B. S. Johnson	UK
Best Documentary and Documentary Feature Film	100 Mules Walking the Los	Bruce Dickson	USA
1970	Calcutta	Louis Malle	France
Honorable Mention Award (Documentary and Documentary Feature Film)	The Garden of Hope	Laurence Guenoun	Brazil
Golden Frame Award for Best Indywood Panorama	Scarabus	Gérald Frydman	Belgium
1973	Nirbashito	Churni Ganguly	India
Golden Frame Award for Best Debut Feature Film	My Life with A King	Carlo Enciso Catu	Philippines
Honorable Mention Award (Debut Feature Film)	Nekro	Pinar Sinan	Turkey
Golden Frame Award for Best Feature Film	Masaan	Neeraj Ghaywan	India
Honorable Mention Award (Feature Film)	Ben & Ara	Nnegest Likke	United States
Golden Frame People Choice Award	Seven Ravens	Alice Nellis	Czech Republic
NETPAC Award for The Best Asian Cinema at ALIIFF	Mina Walking	Yosef Baraki	Afghanistan

=== ALIIFF 2016—Golden Frame Award Winners ===
ALIIFF 2016—Golden Frame Award Winners
Category	Film	Director	Country
Film Critics Circle of India Award For The Best Indian Movie	Violin Player	Bauddhayan Mukherji	India
NETPAC Award for the Best Asian Cinema	Houra	Gholamreza Sagharchiyan	Iran
Best Student Short Film	Chaver	Abhilash Vijayan	India
Best Student Short Film—Honorable Mention	Valentina	Max Kidd	Germany
Best Documentary Film—Winner	The Great Transmission	Pema Gellek	United States
Best Documentary Film—Honorable Mention	Vanishing Island	D.Dhanasumod	India
Best Documentary Film—Winner	SMAJL	Philipp Majer	Germany
Special Mention—Best Educational Film	Take Over	Jennifer Alphonsse	India
Best Short Film	The School	Shiva Kumar	India
Best Short Film - Honorable Mention	Senior Teacher	Sha Mo	China
Best Short Film—Honorable Mention	Cancer 71	Abhishek Talukder	India
Best Indywood Panorama Movie	Pathemari	Salim Ahmed	India
Best Debut Director's Film	1st Sem	Dexter Paglinawan Hemedez & Allan Michael Ibanez	Philippines
Best Feature Film	Nise—The Heart of Madness	Roberto Berliner	Brazil
Best Feature Film—Honorable Mention	Laut	Luisito Lagdameo Ignacio	Philippines
Best Feature Film—Honorable Mention	Metamorphosis (Roopatharam)	M.B. Padmakumar	India
People Choice Award	Shankachil	Goutam Gose	India

=== ALIIFF 2017—Golden Frame Award Winners ===
ALIIFF 2017—Golden Frame Award Winners
Category	Film	Director	Country
Best Student Short Film	The Loudest Silence	Marccela Moreno	Brazil
Best Short Film	Take the Reins	Emma Barrett	USA
Short Film (Honorable Mention)	Chudala	Maaria Sayed	India
Best Documentary	In Return: Just A Book	Shiny Jacob Benjamin	India
Best Indywood Panorama Film	Railway Children	Prithvi Konanur	India
NETPAC Award	Hidden Corner	Jaicheng Jai Dohutia	India
Best Debut Director	Apricot Groves	Pouria Heidary Oureh	Armenia
Debut Director Film (Honorable Mention)	2001: While Kubrick Was in Space	Gabriel Nicoli- Daniel Ortega (cinematography mention)	Argentina
Best Feature Film	Saawan	Farhan Alam	USA
Feature Film (Honorable Mention)	Minnaminungu (Surabhi Lakshmi)	Anil Thomas	India
I.V. Sasi Memorial Golden Frame Award for the Best Indian Debut Director	The Forsaken	Jiju Antony	India

=== ALIIFF 2018—Golden Frame Award Winners ===
ALIIFF 2018—Golden Frame Award Winners
Category	Film	Director	Country
Best Indywood Panorama Film	To Let	Chezhiyan Ra	India
NETPAC Award for the Best Asian Film	Runaway	Abhishek Saha	India
Best Debut Director	Amir	Nima Eghlime	Iran
Debut Director—Honorable Mention (Best Actress)	Runaway	Actrees: Sudipta Chakraborty	India
Debut Director—Honorable Mention (Best Actor)	Kupal	Actor: Levon Haftvan	Iran
Best Feature Film	Octav	Serge Loan Celebidachi	Romania
Best Feature Film	Pupa	Indrasis Acharya	India
