= Kathir (actor) =

Indian actor

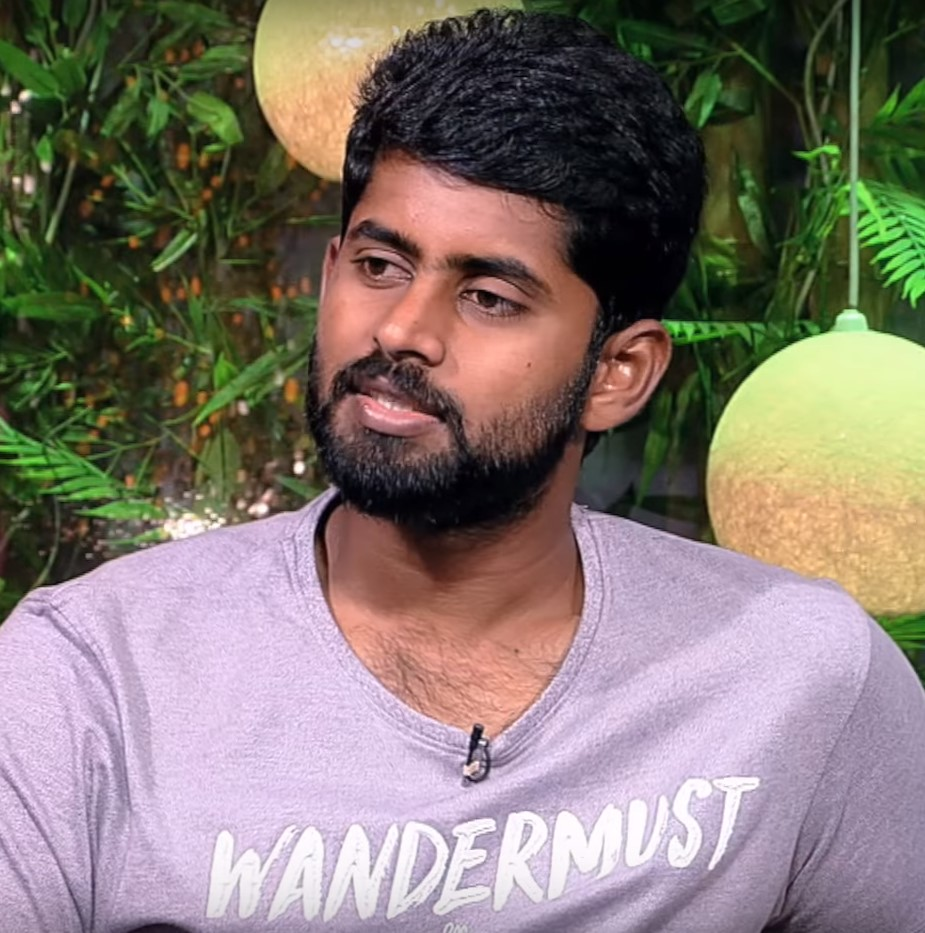
- Occupation: Actor
- Years active: 2013–present

Kathir is an Indian actor who appears in Tamil language films. He made his breakthrough by playing the lead role in Madha Yaanai Koottam (2013) and gained critical acclaim for his performance in Kirumi (2015), Vikram Vedha (2017), Pariyerum Perumal (2018) and Sigai (2019). In 2022, he starred in the Prime Video thriller series Suzhal: The Vortex.

== Career ==
Kathir made his debut as an actor through Vikram Sukumaran's Madha Yaanai Koottam (2013), which was produced by noted music composer G. V. Prakash Kumar Kathir acted in this movie during his college studies. In the evenings, after finishing college studies, he went to shootings. The film opened to positive reviews, with Kathir earning critical acclaim for his portrayal of a village youngster. A critic from The Hindu stated Kathir "tries to do his best", while Sify.com stated he had done "a good job in his first role". Kathir then won critical acclaim for his performance in the thriller film, Kirumi (2015) directed by Anucharan and written by Manikandan. The film was also sent to international film festivals, with a critic from The Hollywood Reporter noting that "playing his namesake character, Kathir makes for a particularly avid small-time crook, effortlessly cataloging useful information for the police officers he smoothly ingratiates himself with by dint of feigned respect and subtle manipulation".

In 2017, he was seen in the action thriller Ennodu Vilayadu alongside Bharath. He was also cast in Vikram Vedha with R. Madhavan and Vijay Sethupathi, Pa. Ranjith's production Pariyerum Perumal (2018), for which he attained national acclaim and was noted for his "outstanding performance". In 2019, Sigai, where he portrayed a gentle and dedicated performance of an effeminate man. He then released Sathru (2019), a crime thriller. He then performed in Bigil (2019), a sports movie directed by Atlee Kumar as a football coach. His next film was also a sports film, Jada (2019), that released to mixed reviews. His film Sarbath was a direct television premiere, which received mixed reviews.

As well as starring in follow-up movies, he had starred in an Amazon Prime Video series created by Pushkar-Gayathri hence Suzhal: The Vortex. The series garnered a widespread pan-India response as well as favorable and positive reviews from the audience and critics alike.

== Filmography ==
Key
†	Denotes films that have not yet been released

List of Kathir film credits
Year	Film	Role	Notes
2013	Madha Yaanai Koottam	Parthiban	
2015	Kirumi	Kathir	
2017	Ennodu Vilayadu	Sridhar	
2017	Vikram Vedha	Vignesh (Pulli)	
2018	Pariyerum Perumal	Pariyerum Perumal (Pariyan)	
2019	Sigai	Mathivanan	
2019	Sathru	SI Kathiresan	
2019	Bigil	Kathir	
2019	Jada	Jada	
2021	Sarbath	Arivu	
2022	Akka Kuruvi	Older Deva	Cameo
2022	Yugi	Rajkumar	
2023	Thalaikoothal	Muthu	
2025	Meesha	Midhun	Malayalam debut
2026	I'm Game	Jason Anthony	Malayalam film
2026	Aasai †	TBA	Post-production
2026	Maanavan †	TBA	Filming

Web Series

List of Kathir television credits
Year	Title	Role	Notes
2022–present	Suzhal: The Vortex	SI Chakravarthy (Sakkarai)	Lead
2026	Lingam	Lingam	Lead

== Awards and nominations ==
List of awards and nominations received by Kathir
Year	Film	Language	Award	Category	Result	Ref.
2018	Pariyerum Perumal	Tamil	Behindwoods Gold Medal	Best Actor	Won	
2019	Pariyerum Perumal	Tamil	8th South Indian International Movie Awards	Special Jury for Outstanding Performance	Won	
