= Mari Selvaraj =

Indian film director and screenwriter (born 1984)

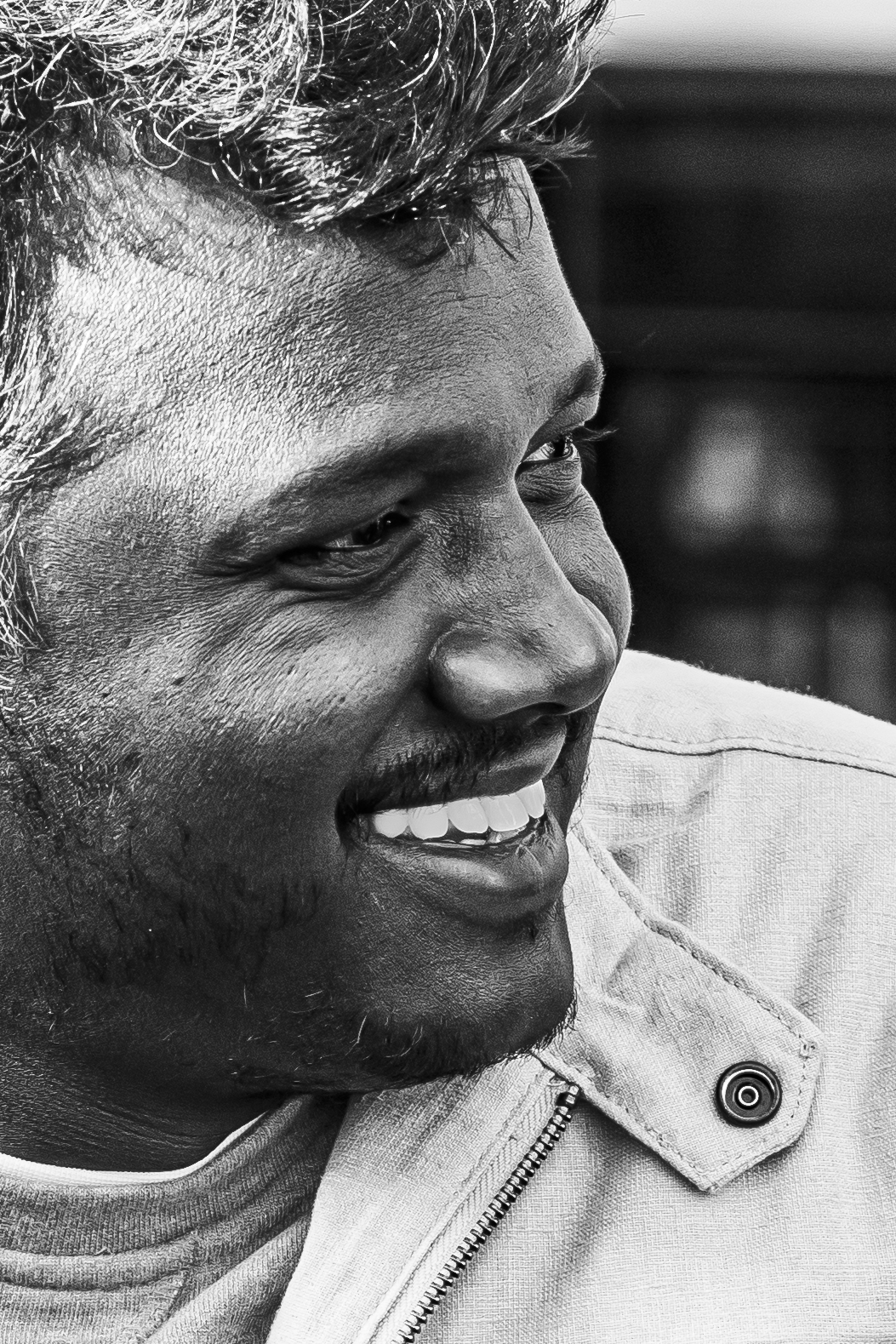
- Born: Mariselvam Selvaraj; Puliyankulam; Srivaikuntam; Thoothukudi district Tamil Nadu
- Occupations: Film director Screenwriter; Producer; Lyricist
- Years active: 2007–present
- Spouse: Divya
- Children: 2

Mariselvam Selvaraj is an Indian film director, screenwriter, producer, and lyricist who primarily works in Tamil cinema. He made his directorial debut with Pariyerum Perumal (2018), which received highly positive reviews and won many awards and accolades.

== Film career ==
Mari Selvaraj joined Ram as an assistant director in three films: Kattradhu Thamizh (2007), Thanga Meenkal (2013), and Taramani (2017).

In 2018, he made his directorial debut with Pariyerum Perumal, which garnered critical acclaim and was one of the most successful films of the year. Afterward, he directed Karnan (2021), Maamannan (2023), Vaazhai (2024), and Bison Kaalamaadan (2025).

== Personal life ==
Mari Selvaraj is married to Divya, and they have two children. Mari had an elder sister who died in 1999 when a banana truck overturned and crushed her.

== Filmography ==
=== As a film director ===
Year	Film	Notes
2018	Pariyerum Perumal	
2021	Karnan	
2023	Maamannan	
2024	Vaazhai	Also producer
2025	Bison Kaalamaadan	
2027	Manjanathi	Also producer

=== As a lyricist ===
Year	Film	Song(s)
2018	Pariyerum Perumal	"Naan Yaar", "Karuppi"
2021	Karnan	"Kanda Vara", "Utradheenga Yeppov"
2024	Vaazhai	"Oru Oorula Raja", "Paadhavathi", "Vaazhai's Surprise"
2025	Bison Kaalamaadan	"Theekkoluthi", "Kaalamaadan Gaanam", "Rekka Rekka", "Cheenikkallu", "Thennaadu"

== Awards and nominations ==
Year	Film	Award	Category	Result	Ref.
2018	Pariyerum Perumal	16th Chennai International Film Festival	Best Tamil Feature	Won	
2019	Pariyerum Perumal	Ananda Vikatan Cinema Awards	Best Story	Won	
2019	Pariyerum Perumal	Ananda Vikatan Cinema Awards	Best Director	Won	
2019	Pariyerum Perumal	Norway Tamil Film Festival Awards	Best Director	Nominated	
2019	Pariyerum Perumal	Film Critics Circle of India	Award for Best Debut Film	Won	
2019	Pariyerum Perumal	Toulouse Indian Film Festival	Audience Award	Won	
2019	Pariyerum Perumal	Toulouse Indian Film Festival	Independent Critic Award	Won	
2019	Pariyerum Perumal	Toulouse Indian Film Festival	Jury Award	Won	
2023	Karnan	Ananda Vikatan Cinema Awards	Best Dialogue	Won	
2024	Maamannan	Ananda Vikatan Cinema Awards	Best Dialogue	Won	
2024	Maamannan	Filmfare Awards South	Best Director	Nominated	
2025	Vaazhai	Ananda Vikatan Cinema Awards	Best Director	Won	

== Other works ==
- Marakkave Ninaikkiren (Tamil: மறக்கவே நினைக்கிறேன்), a series in Tamil Magazine Ananda Vikatan.
- Thamirabaraniyil Kollapadathavargal (Tamil: தாமிரபரணியில் கொல்லப்படாதவர்கள்), short stories collection published in 2013 by Vamsi Pathipagam. This is Mari Selvaraj's Debut fiction
