= Pariyerum Perumal =

2018 Indian film by Mari Selvaraj

- Theatrical release poster
- Directed by: Mari Selvaraj
- Written by: Mari Selvaraj
- Produced by: Pa. Ranjith
- Starring: Kathir; Anandhi
- Cinematography: Sridhar
- Edited by: Selva R. K.
- Music by: Santhosh Narayanan
- Production company: Neelam Productions
- Distributed by: Lyca Productions
- Release date: 28 September 2018
- Running time: 154 minutes
- Country: India
- Language: Tamil

Pariyerum Perumal (transl. The Emperor who mounts a Horse) (Note: Also the title character.) is a 2018 Indian Tamil-language romantic drama film written and directed by Mari Selvaraj, and produced by Pa. Ranjith. The film stars Kathir and Anandhi, while Yogi Babu, Lijeesh, Hari Krishnan and G. Marimuthu appear in supporting roles. It follows Pariyan (Kathir), who befriends Jothi (Anandhi), who falls in love with him. Soon after, her family members begin harassing Pariyan due to his caste.

Pariyerum Perumal is the directorial debut of Selvaraj, and drew inspiration from his 2012 short story collection Thamirabaraniyil Kollapadathavaragal (transl. Those not killed in the Thamirabarani) and 2013 serial Marakave Ninaikiraen (transl. I think only to forget). It is the first feature film produced by Ranjith's Neelam Productions. The film, announced in October 2016, was shot between January 2017 and March 2018, with Tirunelveli and Thoothukudi as the primary filming locations. The music was composed by Santhosh Narayanan, with cinematography handled by Sridhar and editing done by Selva R. K.

Pariyerum Perumal was released on 28 September 2018, and became a critical and commercial success. The film received four Ananda Vikatan Cinema Awards, including Best Story and Best Director, six nominations at the 8th SIIMA Awards, receiving two wins, four nominations at the 66th Filmfare Awards South, winning Best Film, and two Tamil Nadu State Film Awards: Best Film and Best Director. The film was honoured at the 16th Chennai International Film Festival, receiving an award for the best feature, and was also screened at the 49th International Film Festival of India. It was remade in Kannada as Karki (2024) and in Hindi as Dhadak 2 (2025).

== Plot ==
Pariyerum Perumal alias Pariyan, a young man from an oppressed caste in Puliyankulam village near Tirunelveli, loses his dog, Karuppi, to caste hegemony. Later, Pariyan secures admission to Government Law College in Tirunelveli, aspiring to become a lawyer like B. R. Ambedkar. He meets Jothi Mahalakshmi alias Jo, a naive student from an upper-caste family of Ambasamudram, who offers to teach him English. Jo eventually falls in love with Pariyan. Their friendship draws the ire of Sankaralingam, Jo's cousin and fellow student, who asserts his caste superiority over Pariyan.

Unaware of Sankaralingam's hostility, Jo invites Pariyan to her sister's wedding. At the venue, Sankaralingam and his friends severely assault Pariyan and humiliate him. Jo's father intervenes but strictly orders Pariyan to stay away from Jo. Unaware of the incident, Jo berates Pariyan for missing the wedding. Distressed, Pariyan attends class intoxicated, resulting in disciplinary summons from the principal. However, he hires an actor to impersonate his father.

Sankaralingam continues to harass Pariyan, eventually pushing him into the women's restroom and locking him inside. The consequent commotion causes another summon from the principal. This time, Pariyan brings his real father, who works as a folk dancer working in drag. The principal acknowledges Pariyan's innocence and motivates him to persevere against discrimination. However, as they leave the office, Sankaralingam's gang hazes Pariyan's father and strips his clothing. Pariyan's father flees in humiliation, and Pariyan takes him to a hospital for treatment.

Meanwhile, Jo's father observes his daughter's growing affection for Pariyan. Fearing social ostracization if she marries outside their caste, he hires "Thatha Maistry", an elderly contract killer who commits honor killings disguised as accidental deaths. Maistry considers his work a divine duty, vowing to end his life if he ever fails a contract. At the hospital, Pariyan contemplates revenge but his mother dissuades him, warning that violence will only add to their problems. Jo visits Pariyan at the hospital, urging him to restore their friendship, and he agrees.

Maistry tricks Pariyan into giving him a ride on his bicycle and attempts to murder him by tying him to a railway track, mimicking Karuppi's death. Pariyan manages to break free and subdues Maistry, along with Sankaralingam and his associates who arrive at the scene. Pariyan privately confronts Jo's father, warning him that he is sparing his life only to protect Jo from discovering her father's true nature, and demands an end to the harassment. Having failed his contract for the first time, Maistry commits suicide on the railway track.

Later, Jo brings her father to meet Pariyan at a tea stall. When Jo steps away, her father apologises for his past behaviour and speaks politely to Pariyan. Pariyan replies that as long as upper-caste people expect oppressed-caste people to remain submissive, social reality will never change.

== Cast ==
- Kathir as S. Pariyerum Perumal (Pariyan)
- Anandhi as Jothi Mahalakshmi (Jo)
- Yogi Babu as Anand
- Lijeesh as Sankaralingam
- Hari Krishnan as Pariyan's senior
- Shanmugarajan as Pariyan's false father
- G. Marimuthu as Jo's father
- Poo Ramu as the college principal
- Karate Venkatesan as Thatha Maistry
- Lizzie Antony as a college professor
- Suganthi Nachchiyal as a college professor
- Raghu as Jo's brother
- Janaki (Note: Credited as Vennila Kabadi Kuzhu Janaki.) as Pariyan's mother
- Vannarpettai Thangaraj as Pariyan's father
- Supergood Subramani as R. K. Raja
- Anthony Daasan in a special appearance ("Engum Pugazh Thuvanga")

== Production ==
=== Development ===
Pa. Ranjith registered his maiden film production company, Neelam Productions in late October 2016. Although the company had produced two documentary films, Ranjith announced his debut as a feature film producer, with his association with Mari Selvaraj, a former assistant of Ram, in his directorial debut, titled Pariyerum Perumal, in December 2016. The film was inspired by Selvaraj's Thamirabaraniyil Kollapadathavaragal, a short story collection and Marakave Ninaikiraen, a serial in Ananda Vikatan. Sridhar, Selva R. K. and Ramu joined the team as cinematographer, editor and art director respectively.

=== Casting ===
Mari Selvaraj stated, "I wanted faces that reflected a kind of simplicity and innocence, and Kathir and Anandhi fit that description perfectly". Kathir stated that after he heard about the project, he personally approached the director and was cast. Mari Selvaraj later revealed that Atharvaa was his first choice for the role as he was impressed with the actor's performance in Paradesi (2013), but Atharvaa could not spare dates. Anandhi's role was inspired from the characterisation of Shweta Tripathi in Masaan (2015). Anupama Parameswaran later revealed that she was the first choice for the lead actress but declined due to scheduling conflicts. The film notably features a cross-breed dog named "Karuppi", which has traits of the Chippiparai breed. According to the director, "The film incidentally starts and ends with her travel".

=== Filming ===
Principal photography commenced in late January 2017, with Tirunelveli and Thoothukudi regions serving as the principal shooting locations. The film's shooting was completed in March 2018. That November, the makers released a video titled "Pariyerum Perumal Making Video", showing how some of the film's perceived disturbing scenes were shot.

== Music ==
Pa. Ranjith's regular composer Santhosh Narayanan, was assigned to compose the music and background score of Pariyerum Perumal. The album was launched by Dhanush on 9 September 2018.

== Marketing and release ==
The film's first promotional poster which released on 14 February 2018, featured a dog with a collar and leash around its neck in the foreground while the silhouettes of a number of people can be seen in the background. The film was originally slated to release in March 2018, but its release was postponed due to the standoff between Nadigar Sangam and Digital Service Providers on the increase of Virtual Print Fee charges. The first trailer of the film was unveiled in June 2018, and received rave response from all corners. The film was released theatrically on 28 September 2018, after receiving a U certificate from the Central Board of Film Certification with no cuts but two mutes. Despite being released in 121 theatres, the film got limited screens, due to the higher profile Chekka Chivantha Vaanam. However, after the positive response received by the audience, theatre owners increased the number of shows and screens. Many filmmakers and actors heaped praise on the film, as did the politician M. K. Stalin. The film opened to theatres across Karnataka on 12 October 2018, and in Kerala on 26 October 2018, following its positive critical acclaim. After its successful theatrical run, the film was made available to stream on Amazon Prime Video from 11 November 2018. The film was screened at the inaugural New York Dalit Film and Cultural Festival in 2019 along with Masaan (2015), Kaala (2018) and Fandry (2013). Along with few other Tamil films, it was showcased at the 49th International Film Festival of India.

== Reception ==
=== Critical reception ===
Pariyerum Perumal received critical acclaim. Srinivasa Ramanujam of The Hindu wrote "With such strong statements to make against caste, the film could have easily adopted a dark theme but it prefers to stay hopeful. The climax is easily among its most touching moments. If there's one film you're watching this year, it has to be Pariyerum Perumal." M Suganth of The Times of India gave the film 4 out of 5 stars "Pariyerum Perumal is a hard-hitting anti-caste drama." Anupama Subramanian of Deccan Chronicle rated 4.5 out of 5 and then stated it as "Pariyerum Perumal is a film that goes beyond your expectations and should not be missed at any cost!" Kirubhakar Purushothaman of India Today gave the film 4 out of 5 stars and stated "Pariyerum Perumal is more depressing when you realise everything that pans out in this disturbing film has actually happened or is happening or will continue to happen in our country." Anjana Shekar of The News Minute reviewed as It can be quite easy to bind a film under seals of approvals like 'masterpiece' and 'milestone'. But there are few films that venture beyond the confines of such labels and Pariyerum Perumal is one such example. At a time when Tamil cinema is turning to look back at its portrayal of caste, more importantly, to rewrite its portrayals, Pariyerum Perumal can effortlessly be called its luminary."

Baradwaj Rangan, writing for Film Companion, gave 3.5 out of 5 stars and stated "This film is a powerful, yet level-headed, drama about an oppressed youth carving out a place of his own." Sify gave the rating 3.5 out of 5 and stated "Pariyerum Perumal is an artistic masterpiece from debutant filmmaker Mari Selvaraj and set the standards high for directors who have noble intentions but end up making preachy propaganda films." Ashameera Aiyappan of Cinema Express gave the film 4 out of 5 and stated "The subtexts are painfully brilliant in a film that doesn't paint the world black and white." Ravichandran Bathran, writing for Firstpost, said, "Pariyerum Perumal is a great movie to watch. However, the movie is neither anti-caste nor casteist. Rather, it merely discusses popular forms of discrimination and evokes memories of some earlier instances of caste violence. The movie eventually tries to find solutions within the caste system itself." Manoj Kumar R of The Indian Express said, "Pariyerum Perumal shows it's not easy to overcome the challenges of all-pervasive caste. But it may not be impossible either."

=== Box office ===
Pariyerum Perumal collected ₹5.5 crore (US$570,000) in its lifetime box office collection, also receiving a share of ₹3.5 crore (US$360,000), and became a sleeper hit.

== Accolades ==
Date of ceremony	Award	Category	Recipient(s) and nominee(s)	Result	Ref.
20 December 2018	16th Chennai International Film Festival	Best Tamil Feature	Mari Selvaraj	Won	
5 January 2019	Ananda Vikatan Cinema Awards	Best Director	Mari Selvaraj	Won	
5 January 2019	Ananda Vikatan Cinema Awards	Best Comedian — Male	Yogi Babu	Won	
5 January 2019	Ananda Vikatan Cinema Awards	Best Music Director	Santhosh Narayanan	Won	
5 January 2019	Ananda Vikatan Cinema Awards	Best Story	Mari Selvaraj	Won	
25–28 April 2019	Norway Tamil Film Festival Awards	Best Film	Pa. Ranjith	Won	
25–28 April 2019	Norway Tamil Film Festival Awards	Best Director	Mari Selvaraj	Nominated	
25–28 April 2019	Norway Tamil Film Festival Awards	Best Production	Pa. Ranjith	Nominated	
25–28 April 2019	Norway Tamil Film Festival Awards	Best Music Director	Santhosh Narayanan	Won	
17 February 2019	Edison Awards	Best Film	Pa. Ranjith	Won	
15 April 2019	Toulouse Indian Film Festival	Film Critics Circle of India Award for Best Debut Film	Mari Selvaraj	Won	
16 August 2019	8th South Indian International Movie Awards	Best Film	Pa. Ranjith	Won	
16 August 2019	8th South Indian International Movie Awards	Special Jury for Outstanding Performance	Kathir	Won	
16 August 2019	8th South Indian International Movie Awards	Best Lyricist	Viveka	Nominated	
16 August 2019	8th South Indian International Movie Awards	Best Music Director	Santhosh Narayanan	Nominated	
16 August 2019	8th South Indian International Movie Awards	Best Debut Director	Mari Selvaraj	Nominated	
21 December 2019	66th Filmfare Awards South	Best Film	Pariyerum Perumal	Won	
21 December 2019	66th Filmfare Awards South	Best Director	Mari Selvaraj	Nominated	
21 December 2019	66th Filmfare Awards South	Best Lyricist	Viveka	Nominated	
21 December 2019	66th Filmfare Awards South	Best Music Director	Santhosh Narayanan	Nominated	
29 January 2026	Tamil Nadu State Film Awards	Best Film	Pariyerum Perumal	Won	
29 January 2026	Tamil Nadu State Film Awards	Best Director	Mari Selvaraj	Won	

== Legacy ==
The portrayal of the film's central dog character Karuppi, became popular among audiences. Inspired from the famous 'Dogelore' (which refers to the meme universe featuring dogs), the character was featured as the new addition. The dog playing Karuppi died in November 2024 after an accident. Some of the film's plot inspired the 2020 Telugu film Colour Photo.

== Remakes ==
Pariyerum Perumal was remade in Kannada as Karki (2024) and in Hindi as Dhadak 2 (2025).
