= S. T. Satyamurthi =

Indian zoologist

S. T. Satyamurthi MA, DSc, FZS

Superintendent, Government Museum, Chennai and Connemara Public Library
- In office 1961 – 1978
- Preceded by: A. Aiyappan
- Succeeded by: N. Harinarayana

Assistant Superintendent, Government Museum, Chennai
- In office 1958 – 1960

Personal details
- Born: 8 June 1922 Madras, Madras Presidency
- Scientific career
- Fields: Zoology
- Workplaces: Government Museum, Chennai

S. Thomas Satyamurti (8 June 1922 – ?) was an Indian zoologist and museum director who contributed to museology and zoological research in India. He served as the Superintendent of the Government Museum, Chennai, and the Connemara Public Library from 1960 to 1978.

== Early life and education ==
Satyamurti was born on 8 June 1922 to D. P. R. Somasundaram and Mercy at Madras. He earned an MA in 1946 and in 1955 a DSc at the National University of Colorado.

== Career ==
Satyamurti began his career as a Curator for Zoology at the Madras Government Museum (1942–1951). He then served in various roles:

- Curator, Natural History Museum, Darjeeling (1952–1953)
- Curator, Natural History Section, Prince of Wales Museum, Bombay (1954)
- Returned to Madras Government Museum as Curator (1956–1957)
- Promoted to Assistant Superintendent, Madras Government Museum (1958-1960)
- Served as Superintendent of the Madras Government Museum, and the Connemara Public Library (1961–1978)

== Contributions ==
During his tenure at Madras Government Museum, he made significant contributions to museum by organising, documenting collections, and writing guidebooks to provide detailed explanations of the exhibits. He oversaw the construction of a separate building for bronze collections in 1963, expanded the Chemical Conservation Section, and opened a new Birds Gallery in the same year. Satyamurti’s academic work focused on zoology and museology. His notable contributions include:

- Bulletins and monographs on marine, land, and freshwater molluscs of South India.
- Illustrated guidebooks on invertebrates, fishes, reptiles, birds, and mammals of South India.
- Handbooks on museum techniques and museology.

== Professional affiliations ==
Satyamurti also was an active member of several prestigious organizations:

- Fellow, Zoological Society of London.
- Vice-President, Museums Association of India, Archaeological Society of South India, and Association of Zoologists, Madras.
- Member, International Council of Museums and Central Museums Review Committee.
- Official Member, Central Advisory Board of Museums.
