= Thanjavur Shiva =

Bronze statue of the Shiva Vishapaharana

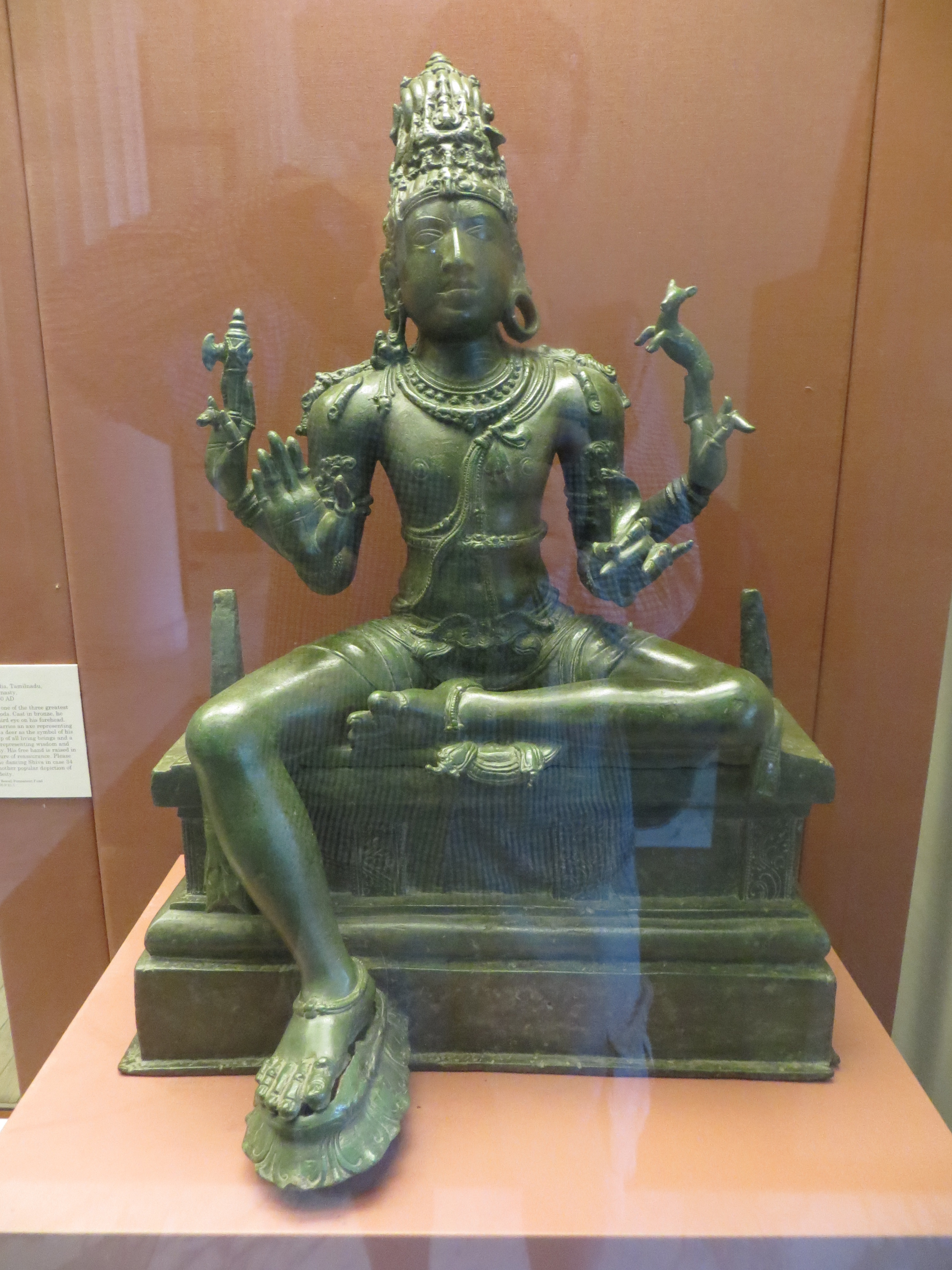
- Statue of Shiva Vishapaharana from Thanjavur on display at the British Museum
- Material: Bronze
- Size: 58 cm High
- Created: 10th Century AD
- Present location: British Museum, London
- Registration: 1970,0921.1

The Thanjavur Shiva is a bronze statue of the Shiva Vishapaharana that was originally made in the district of Thanjavur in southern India. Since its purchase in 1970, this well preserved bronze figure has been considered one of the British Museum's greatest ancient Hindu sculptures from the subcontinent.

== Description ==
The bronze sculpture is a half life size representation of the Hindu god Shiva Vishapaharana wearing an elaborate crown. Intact except for a missing arch above the statue, the god is shown with three arms holding an axe, deer and cobra, with his other arm in the Abhayamudra position. The quality and detail of the casting is very high, demonstrating the remarkable level of craftsmanship achieved during the Chola period. The statue would have once been paraded through the temple precinct to mark religious festivities.

== Provenance ==
The Thanjavur Shiva was purchased by the British Museum from a private collector from New York in 1970. The statue's history prior to its acquisition is less certain but based on iconography and similarity to other statues of the deity, it was almost certainly made in the Thanjavur district in the state of Tamil Nadu between 940 and 950 AD. A similar statue can be seen in the Government Museum, Chennai.
