= Madras Public Libraries Act, 1948 =

The Madras Public Libraries Act, 1948, subsequently renamed as the Tamil Nadu Public Libraries Act, 1948, was enacted in Madras State, India, in 1948. The act was the first of its kind to be enacted in India after independence. The Connemara Public Library became the first library to come under the purview of this act, as a "State central library". Subsequently, nine district libraries were added during the Five year plan from 1951. The act was enacted based on research and activity by S. R. Ranganathan and the Madras Library Association. Other states have enacted public library acts modelled on the Madras Public Libraries Act.

== Background ==
R. K. Bhatt has highlighted how free-to-access public library systems are a necessary adjunct to a developing society, with growing industrialisation and improving rates of literacy, and argues that legislation "is an essential need in any country because it puts the structure, management and finance of library systems on proper legal footing".

Ranganathan recognised this. He had spent time training as a librarian in London around 1923 and was impressed by the system of public library legislation which existed there. Upon returning to India he began to campaign for something similar to exist in his own country. The situation was complicated by the existence of various types of government, including provinces which were administered by the British Raj and various States under the control of princes. The fruits of his research and consultations were presented at the First All India Educational Conference in 1930. This report included a proposed Model Library Act.

Although some areas, such as Baroda, had established public library systems prior to 1945, it was then that the first Act was passed, being the Kolhapur Public Libraries Act. This was followed in 1948 by the Madras Public Libraries Act, which became the first such Act to be passed in the newly independent republic of India. Acts for other areas, such as Kerala and Haryana, followed and generally improved on the earlier legislation.

Prior to the Act, the principal library of Madras was the Connemara Public Library, which had opened in 1860 and became a public library in 1896. A small refundable deposit was required to use it but it was essentially free. It became the State Central Library in 1948 and, in 1981, a depository library.

== Provisions ==
The Madras Public Libraries Act provides for overall governance by a State Library Committee, presided over by the incumbent Education Minister for the State. The committee comprises members from various walks of life, including representatives from universities and from the State Library Association, as well as a Secretary whose primary function is as assistant to the Director of Public Libraries (DPL). The latter role is assumed by the incumbent Director of Public Instruction.

Revenue is obtained via a cess, a tax which is collected by local administrative bodies such as the Nagar Palikas and Panchayats. Those bodies remit the tax to their Local Library Association (LLA), which operates as an umbrella organisation at the mid-tier District administrative level. The rate of taxation is fixed in law but the LLA can request a higher rate if the State government agrees to it. The State government matches the funds generated by the cess. The LLA determines the conditions of entry to the libraries under its control.

Cities with a population in excess of 50,000 must have a central library of their own and provisions exist for expansion to include branch libraries and other means of devolved access if demand should require such. In addition to libraries that are administered by the LLA, the Act provides for a register of other libraries. This is maintained by the DPL, who has the power to issue grants from State resources to those institutions listed. With the exception of the city of Madras, these grants cannot be less than the cess collected elsewhere.

Further resources are obtained by a modification caused by the Act. The Press and Registration of Books Act of 1857 is amended such that a situation somewhat akin to copyright libraries exists. All publishers within the State are required to provide five copies of their output to the State government, which in turn passes on four of those copies to the State Central Library.

Until various reorganisations of States, the Act applied to parts of what are now Andhra Pradesh and Kerala.

== Evolution ==
Several perceived failings in the Madras Public Libraries Act have been addressed in subsequent Acts elsewhere. For example, the Hyderabad legislation, which later became the Andhra Pradesh Public Libraries Act, states that there should be a completely separate department of government to administer the libraries; that the head of the State Library Committee (in this case called the State Library Council) should be elected rather than defaulting to the portfolio of the current Education Minister; and that all local administrative areas should have their own library authority. Furthermore, the amount and extent of the cess collected was improved by extending the range of taxes upon which the surcharge was levied; and the government, through the State Library Council, has a duty to train the librarians. A key strategy which was embodied in the Act was the formulation of a hierarchical system whereby the local libraries were connected to the District libraries and they, in turn, were connected to the State Central Library and the National Library. Centralised acquisition and resource sharing was envisaged. This strategy had formed a part of the Second Five Year Plan but it appears not to have been enforced with any haste; Brahmanda Barua wrote in 1992 that throughout India "The network principle has nowhere been applied in organising the libraries."

Bhatt believes that the Karnataka Public Libraries Act is the most adequate and best functioning in the evolution of such Acts, and notes that the lack of provision for a cess in the later Acts for Maharashtra and West Bengal are a significant failing. In the case of Karnataka, there is a State Library Authority which is presided over by the Minister for Education, and also a fully-fledged Department of Public Libraries and local administrative bodies. The cess applies to a wide range of taxes, including those on property and vehicles, and there is further funding in non-city areas as a consequence of the stipulation that the State government must give to the local bodies 3% of all revenues received from land taxes in their area. The financing of the State Library Authority is determined by the lower authorities and private libraries can request grants but are not automatically entitled to them.

== Recent situation nationally ==
By 2002 there had been a total of 12 public library acts in place, although two of those - for Hyderabad and Kolhapur - had been superseded due to changes in the administrative structure of those areas, and two others had not been enforced. Narasimha Raju considered that these Acts had proved to be "by and large ineffective", due to a combination of poor financing, poor administrative structure and, in some States, the "lethargy and negative attitude" of their governments. Raju also identified problems with the rapidly changing face of technology and noted that most of the libraries were unable to adapt to developments in television, radio and video recording. The Indian Library Association had taken on the campaign to improve matters, principally by promoting new legislation to replace that which already existed and Raju noted that many believed legislation should exist for the entire country rather than being a piecemeal system.

Despite only eight Acts being in force, all twenty-five States and seven Union Territories had a central library and 75% of the Districts, which are the next tier of administration, had a similar facility. While legislated areas such as Maharashtra (1967) relied on volunteers and development of free libraries from the core of an existing subscription library system, Tamil Nadu, Karnataka (1965) and Andhra Pradesh (1960) were thought by T. Malleshappa to be the most developed when quantified by density of libraries and percentage of the population who had free access. D. B. Eswara Reddy, writing in the same publication, bemoaned the poor provision below District level, with 90% of the rural population not having access even to a reading room or circulating library, let alone modern multimedia and computing technology. Despite legislation and theoretical targets, library facilities remained the preserve of the urban elite and, for example, in Andhra Pradesh most children in rural areas were first-generation literates.

== See also ==
- States Reorganisation Act
- Tamil Nadu Government Laws & Rules
- List of libraries in India
