= National Art Gallery, Chennai =

Coordinates: 13°4′10″N 80°15′21″E

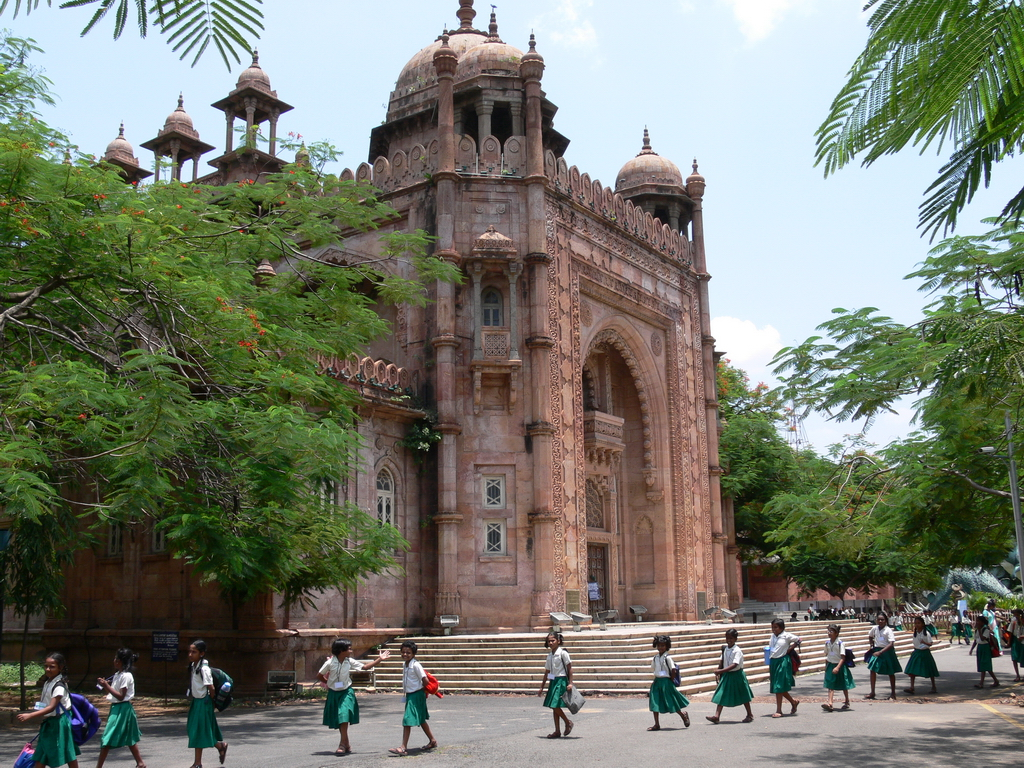
National Art Gallery (Chennai)

The National Art Gallery situated in Egmore, Chennai, is one of the oldest art galleries in India. It is located in the Government Museum Complex on Pantheon Road, Egmore, which also houses the Government Museum and the Connemara Public Library. Constructed with red stones sourced from Satyavedu in Andhra Pradesh, the Gallery was built in 1906 in Indo-Saracenic architecture and houses paintings from Thanjavur, Rajasthan, Kangra and Deccan areas, as well as sandalwood sculptures. The Gallery has remained closed since 2002, as part of the structure suffered damage.

== History ==
The National Art Gallery was built during the celebration of Queen Victoria's Golden Jubilee in Indo-Saracenic style, designed by architect Henry Irwin. The Gallery has been identified as a Heritage site by the CMDA.

As of 2002 the gallery has been closed for tourists, due to several building flaws and structural instability, which triggered severe criticism from art critics.

== Features ==
The gallery contains several Mugul paintings and rare works of Raja Ravi Varma. It also has various Tanjore Paintings. Portraits of various British officers such as Lord Connemara and Lord William Bentinck are also present. The art gallery also included numerous miniature paintings depicting court and battle scenes.

== Restoration ==
In 2013, the Gallery was set for a major face lift with Chief Minister J. Jayalalithaa allocating ₹ 110 million for repairs and forming an expert committee for its restoration.

In 2019, renovation of the Gallery began at a cost of ₹ 110 million. After renovation, it will have 200 unique exhibits on display, including paintings of Ravi Varma, sandalwood artefacts, ivory objects, miniature artefacts, Tanjore paintings, Rajput paintings and traditional paintings from across India.

== See also ==
- Government Museum, Chennai
- Heritage structures in Chennai
