= George Bidie =

British physician

Surgeon General George Bidie CIE
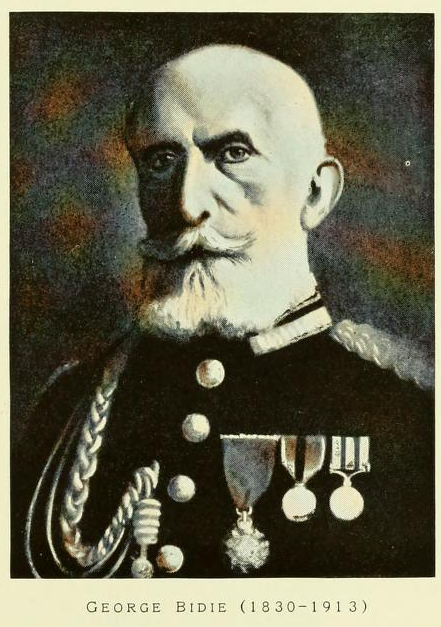

Superintendent of the Government Museum, Chennai
- In office 1872–1885
- Preceded by: Jesse Mitchell
- Succeeded by: Edgar Thurston

Personal details
- Born: 1830
- Died: 1913 (aged 82–83)
- Spouse: Isabella Wiseman
- Profession: physician

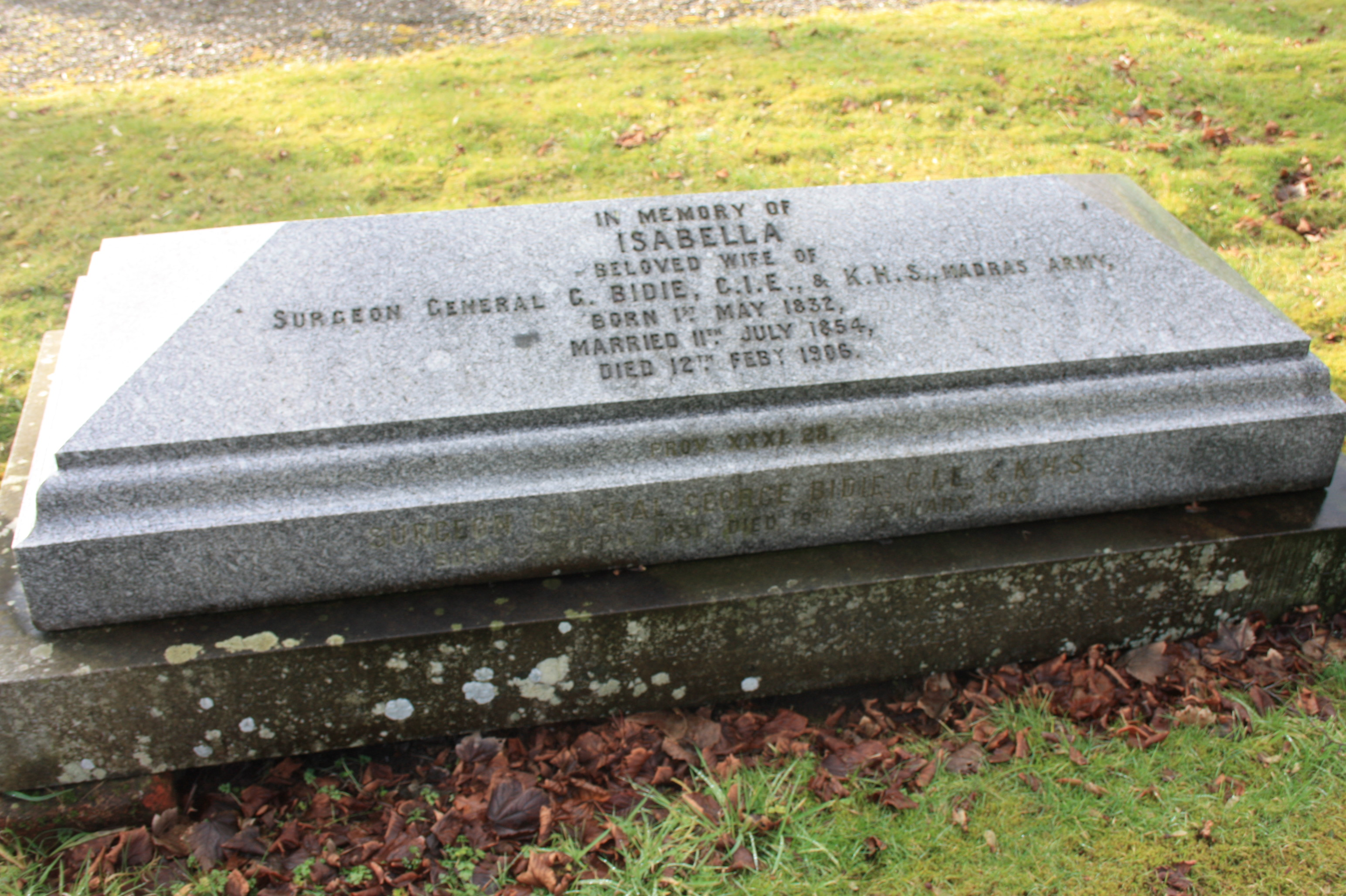
The grave of Surgeon General George Bidie, Logie Kirkyard

Surgeon General George Bidie CIE (3 April 1830 – 19 February 1913) was a British physician who worked in India in the Madras Medical Service. He was also Superintendent of the Government Museum, Chennai from 1872 to 1885.

== Early life and education ==
Bidie was born in Buckies, Banffshire, United Kingdom on 3 April 1830. He studied at Edinburgh and the University of Aberdeen and received an MD degree from Marischal College. In 1853 he was created a Fellow of the Royal College of Surgeons of Edinburgh and joined the Indian Medical Service as an Assistant Surgeon on 20 February 1856.

== Career ==
Bidie joined the Madras Medical Service in 1856 and served with the Hyderabad contingent during the 1857 rebellion and received a medal. He was a Civil Surgeon at Guntur during 1859 and between 1867 and 1868, served on special duty in Mysore and Coorg to investigate the stem borer (Xylotrechus quadripes) and its damage to coffee. He was a Professor of Botany at the Madras Medical College and a Superintendent of the Lunatic Asylum between 1866 and 1870. He helped introduce humane practises for the treatment of the insane as well as medical inspections in schools. During this period he also took an interest in the deforestation-desiccation debate and wrote about the effects of deforestation in Coorg. He rose through the ranks becoming Surgeon (20 February 1868), Surgeon-Major (1 July 1873), Brigade Surgeon (28 February 1883), Deputy Surgeon-General (11 October 1884) and Surgeon-General (9 October 1886). During his service he was decorated Order of the Crown of Italy (1882) and made a CIE (1 January 1883) and appointed Honorary Surgeon to the Queen (16 February 1898), a position he held under Queen Victoria, King Edward VII and King George V.

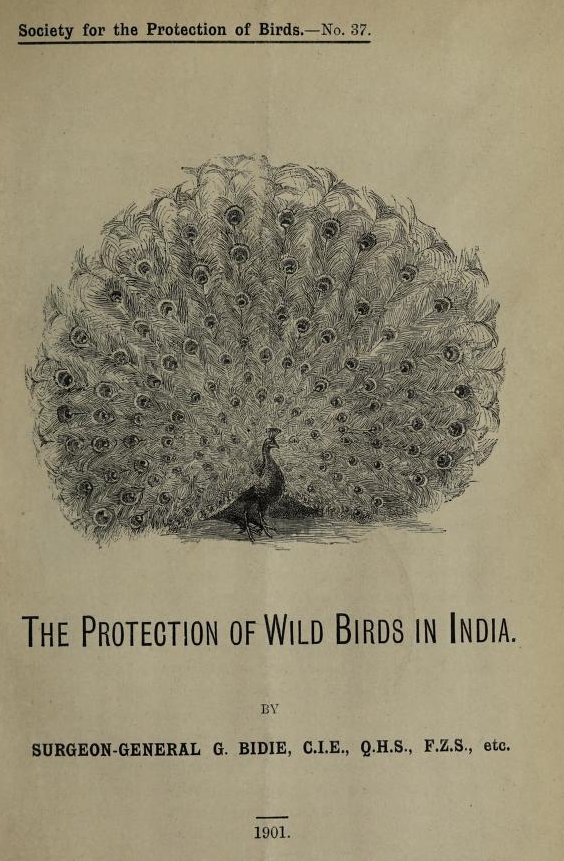
Cover of Bidie's 1901 pamphlet

Bidie also worked as Superintendent of the Madras Museum from 1872 to 1884 as well as serving on the Cinchona Commission in 1873. He became a Fellow of Madras University in 1879. He also worked on sanitation, becoming Sanitary Commissioner of the Madras Presidency (1886) and was a delegate in the International Congress on Hygiene and Demography in 1891. While at the Madras Museum, he wrote on a wide range of subjects including natural history, numismatics and archaeology. Bidie attempted to introduce cocoa cultivation in southern India, growing them experimental at the museum. Dewan Rama Iyer of Travancore consulted Bidie on the manufacture of paper. Bidie considered Casuarina equisetifolia as a plant suitable for "reclamation" of sandy soils. He was a friend of Richard Henry Beddome and had the museum acquire his herbarium collections for Rs. 1,500 in 1873-74. The collection included 2,435 specimens of plants. In 1876 Bidie was appointed to the newly established executive committee of management of the Madras School of Arts. He was elected a Fellow of the Zoological Society of London in 1890. Bidie was instrumental in setting up laws for the protection of wild birds in India. He was a life member of the Royal Society for the Protection of Birds and published a leaflet on The Protection of Wild Birds in India (1901). Francis Day named a species of fish after him as Caranx bidii, but this is now considered a junior synonym of Selaroides leptolepis.

He died of old age on 19 February 1913. He is buried in the cemetery of Logie Kirk. The grave lies towards the south-east.

== Family ==
Bidie married Isabella, daughter of Alexander Wiseman of Banchory, Aberdeenshire on 11 July 1854. They had five daughters and four sons among whom one who was also named George Bidie, became a Lieutenant-Colonel and followed in his father's footsteps to serve in the Indian Medical Service. His estate was valued at £2943 at the time of his death.
