= John Robertson Henderson =

Scottish zoologist

John Robertson Henderson CIE FRSE FZS FLS
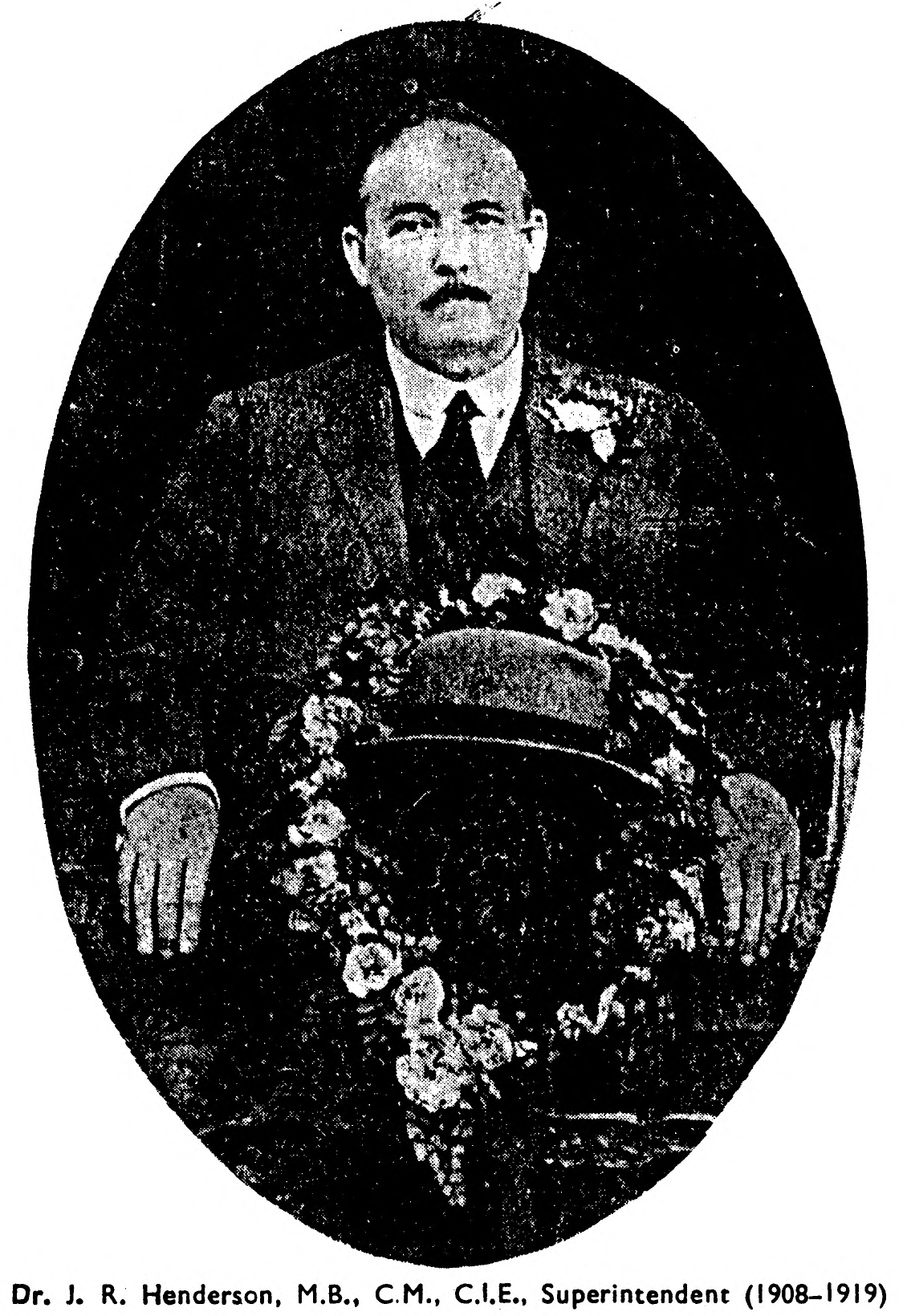

Superintendent of the Government Museum, Chennai and Connemara Public Library
- In office 1908–1920
- Preceded by: Edgar Thurston
- Succeeded by: F. H. Gravely

Personal details
- Born: 21 May 1863 Melrose, Scotland
- Died: 26 October 1925 (aged 62) Edinburgh, Scotland
- Spouses: Alice Roberta Sinclair (1868–1915); Elizabeth (Lizzie) Adie
- Education: University of Edinburgh
- Profession: zoologist

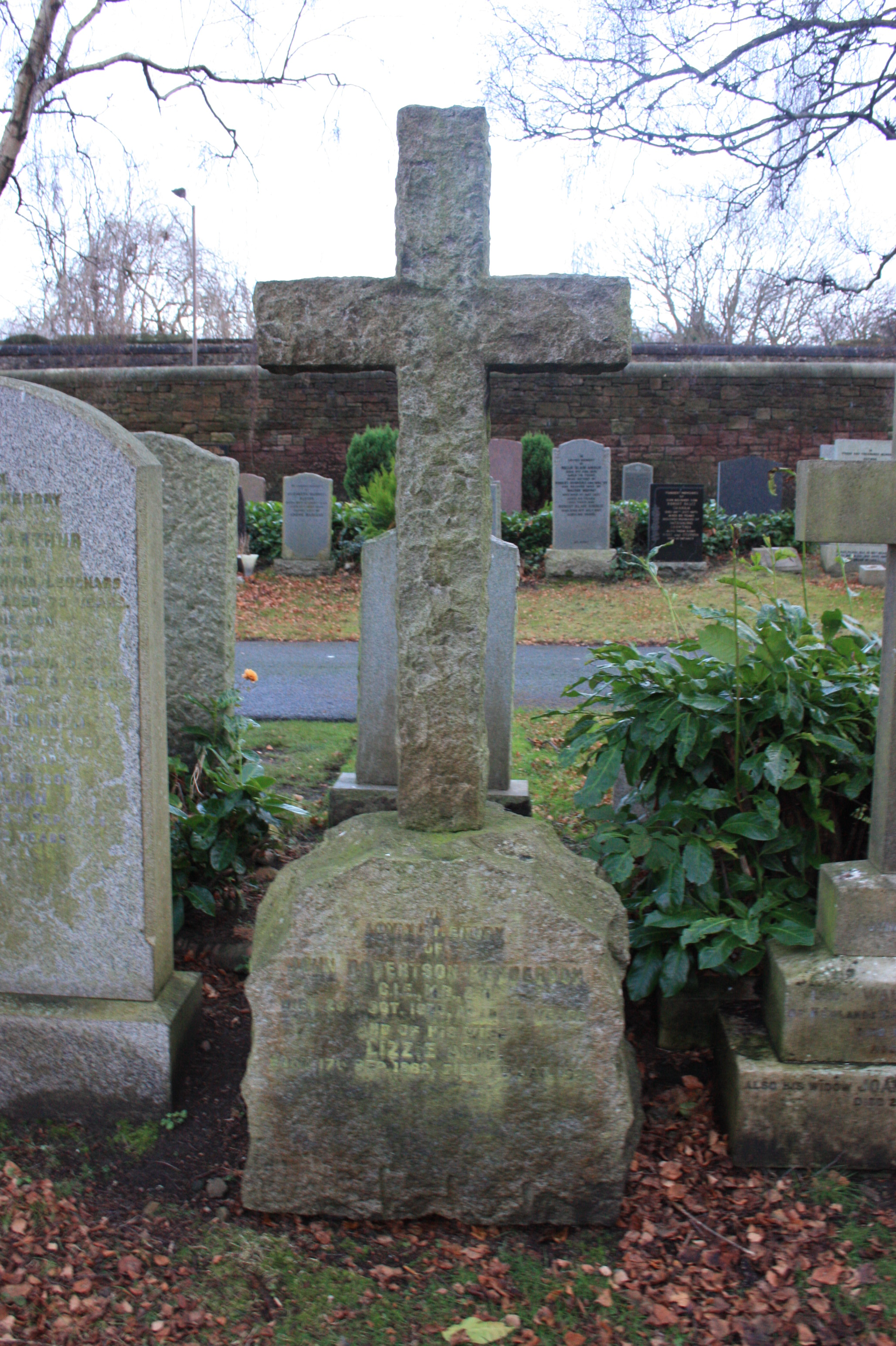
The grave of John Robertson Henderson, Dean Cemetery, Edinburgh

John Robertson Henderson CIE FRSE FZS FLS (21 May 1863 – 26 October 1925) was a Scottish zoologist who specialized in the taxonomy of marine crustaceans, particularly the decapods, and worked on specimens collected by the oceanic research vessels Investigator and Challenger. From 1892 until 1911 he was Professor of Zoology at Madras Christian College in India. From 1908 to 1920 he was Superintendent of the Government Museum in Madras. He also took an interest in numismatics and Indian history.

== Life ==
Henderson was born on 21 May 1863 in Melrose the son of Inland Revenue official Edward Henderson (1825–1894) and Jessie Louttit Henderson (née Robertson) (1834–1894). He was educated at both Dulwich College and Dollar Academy. He then studied medicine at the University of Edinburgh. Henderson was awarded the Dobbie-Smith Gold Medal in Botany in 1883 and graduated MB ChB in 1884. He was influenced by Sir Wyville Thomson and took an interest in marine zoology. He worked at the Firths of Forth and Clyde and examined the collections obtained from the Challenger expedition while working at the Scottish Marine Station, Granton.

He moved to India in 1885-6 to become a professor of zoology at the Madras Christian College where he worked until 1911. Additional duties included being in charge of the Government Museum, the principal librarian at the Connemara Public Library and as Keeper of the Madras Aquarium. In 1896 he worked on the Paguridae (hermit crabs) obtained by the Royal Indian Marine Survey ship Investigator. He retired in 1911 and returned to Scotland in 1919. In 1918 he was created a Companion of the Order of the Indian Empire (CIE). In 1923 he was elected a Fellow of the Royal Society of Edinburgh. His proposers were Arthur Crichton Mitchell, James Hartley Ashworth, D'Arcy Wentworth Thompson and James Ritchie.

Henderson married Alice Roberta Sinclair (1868–1915) in Madras in 1888. They had a son and a daughter. After her death, he married Elizabeth (“Lizzie”) Beatrice Adie (1882–1936) at Delting in 1921. They had no children. He died in Edinburgh on 26 October 1925 at a nursing home from a malignant liver tumour. He is buried with his wife in Dean Cemetery in western Edinburgh.

The genus Hendersonida Cabezas & Macpherson, 2014 and several species are named after him including:

- Anapagurus hendersoni Barnard, 1947
- Gastroptychus hendersoni (Alcock & Anderson, 1899)
- Macrobrachium hendersoni (de Man, 1906) = Bithynsi hendersoni Rathbun, 1910, Palaemon hendersoni Kemp, 1913
- Raninioides hendersoni Chopra, 1933
- Bakousa hendersoniana (de Man, 1899)
- Hyastenus hendersoni (Laurie, 1906)
- Halimede hendersoni Nobili, 1905
- Palapedia hendersoni (Rathbun, 1902)
- Parapinnixa hendersoni Rathbun, 1918

== Publications ==
- (1885) Recent additions to the invertebrate fauna of the Firth of Forth. Proceedings of the Royal Physical Society of Edinburgh 8: 307–313.
- (1885) The Echinodermata of the Firth of Clyde. Proceedings of the Royal Physical Society of Edinburgh 9:328–337.
- (1885) Diagnoses of the new species of Galatheidae collected during the “Challenger”expedition. Annals and Magazine of Natural History (series 5) 16:407–421.
- (1886) A dredging trip to Arran. The Scottish Naturalist (new series) 2:5–9.
- (1886) A synopsis of the British Paguridae.Proceedings of the Royal Physical Society ofEdinburgh9:65–75.
- (1886) Higher Crustacea of the Firth of Clyde. XXXIV. The decapod and schizopod Crustacea of the Firth of Clyde.Proceedings and Transactions of the Natural History Society of Glasgow(new series)1: 315–353.
- (1887) Notes on the Madras species of Matuta. Madras Journal of Literature and Science.29:63–68.
- (1888) Report on the Anomura collected by H. M. S. “Challenger” during the years 1873–76. In: J. Murray (editor), Report on the Scientific Results of the Voyage of H. M. S.“Challenger”during the Years 1873–1876, under the Command of Captain George S. Nares, R. N., F. R. S. and the late Captain Frank Tourle Thomson, RN. Zoology, Volume 27 (1), pp. i–xi, 1–221. London, Edinburgh and Dublin.
- (1893) A contribution to Indian carcinology. Transactions of the Linnean Society of London:Zoology 5: 325–458.
- (1896) Natural history notes from H. M. Royal Indian Marine Survey Steamer “Investigator”, Commander C. F. Oldham RN, commanding. Series 2, No. 24. Report on the Paguridae collected during the season 1893–1894. Journal of the Asiatic Society of Bengal 65(2): 516–536.
- (1906) On a new species of coral-infesting crab taken by the R. I. M. S. “Investigator” at the Andaman Islands.Annals and Magazine of Natural History (series 7) 18:211–219.
- (1912) Description of a new species of freshwater crab from southern India. Records of the Indian Museum 7: 111–112.
- (1913) A new variety of freshwater crab from Travancore. Records of the Indian Museum 9:47–49.
- (1914) Note on the dates of the Mauludi era of Tipu Sultan of Mysore. Numismatic Supplement, No. 23. Journal of the Asiatic Society of Bengal (new series)10: 251.
- (1915) Crustacea decapod fauna of the Chilka lake. Records of the Indian Museum 5: 190–325.
- (1915) Hermit-crabs from the Chilka lake.Records of the Indian Museum 11:25–29.
- (1921) The Coins of Haidir Ali and Tipu Sultan. Madras.
- (1923) [Obituary] Charles Michie Smith, C. I. E., B. Sc., F. R. A. S. Proceedings of the Royal Society of Edinburgh (session 1922–1923)43: 253–254.
- (1924) [Obituary] Nelson Annandale, C. I. E., D. Sc., F. R. S. Proceedings of the Royal Physical Society of Edinburgh 21:101–103.
- With George Matthai (1910) On certain species of Palaemon from south India. Records of the Indian Museum 5:277–305.
