= Government Museum, Chennai =

Museum in Tamil Nadu, India

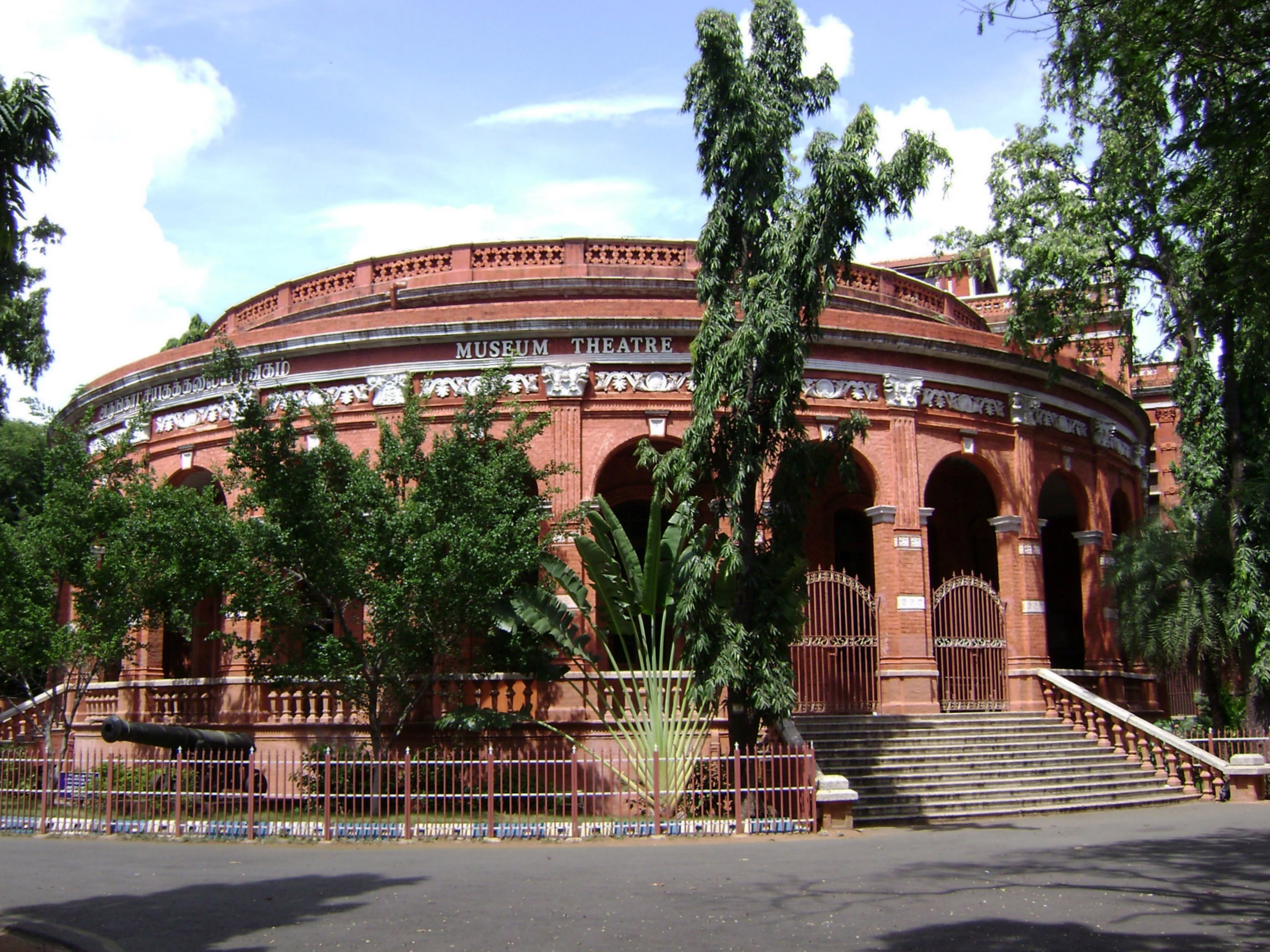
- Museum Theatre, the front façade of the Government Museum, Chennai

- Government Museum, Egmore, Chennai, Tamil Nadu Government Museum, Chennai (Tamil Nadu)
- Established: 1851; 175 years ago
- Location: Egmore, Chennai, Tamil Nadu, India
- Coordinates: 13.0711°N 80.2569°E
- Type: Art museum, History museum
- Collection size: 1.7 million
- Visitors: 602,345 (2018)
- Owners: Ministry of Culture, Government of Tamil Nadu
- Public transit access: Chennai Egmore (Suburban); Egmore
- Website: www.govtmuseumchennai.org

The Government Museum, Chennai, or the Madras Museum, is a museum of human history and culture located in the Government Museum Complex in the neighbourhood of Egmore in Chennai, India. Started in 1851, it is the second oldest museum in India after the Indian Museum in Kolkata. It has among the largest collections of Roman currency outside Europe. The Museum Theatre is a central landmark of the museum. The National Art Gallery is also present in the museum premises. Built in Indo-Saracenic style, it houses rare European and Asian paintings by renowned artists, including Raja Ravi Varma. It had 600,000 visitors in 2018. It has a large collection of bronze idols, 500 of them dating to 1000 BCE, in Asia.

== Location ==
The museum is located in what is known as the Pantheon complex, or "public assembly rooms." It is located in the Government Museum Complex on Pantheon Road in Egmore. The road on which the museum is located also takes its name from the complex. The Government Museum Complex also houses the Connemara Public Library and the National Art Gallery.

== History ==
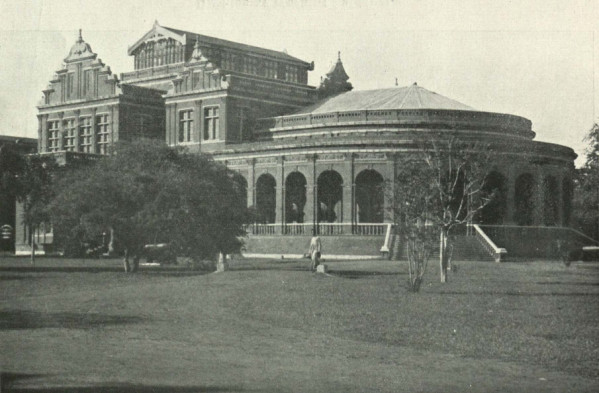
The museum complex by Willie Burke, c. 1905

In August 1778, the governor of Madras granted 43 acres for an estate to a civil servant, who, subsequently in 1793, assigned the grounds to a committee of 24 which then regulated the public amusements in the city. In 1821, the committee sold the main house and central garden space to E. S. Moorat, an Armenian merchant who, in turn, sold it back to the government in 1830. The government first used the buildings and the grounds as the collector's "Cutcherry" and later for the "Central Museum." The museum was originally established in a building on College Road in Nungambakkam in the year 1851 and was shifted to the present site in 1854.

Many additions to the original building were constructed between 1864 and 1890. The core of the old museum building includes the only surviving remnants of the Pantheon, identified from the broad steps leading into it when viewed from the north. Amongst the additions is the Connemara Public Library, built with stained glass windows, ornate woodwork and elaborate stucco decorations, formally opened in 1896 and named after its progenitor. The building was built by Namberumal Chetty and was designed by Henry Irwin, with the interiors resembling those of Bank of Madras (SBI). The design included a huge reading room with a wooden ceiling between two curved rows of stained glass, supported by ornate pillars and arches embellished with sculpted acanthus leaves. It was supplemented with teakwood furniture, marbled floor, and decorative windows. All of these were restored in 2004–2007. The building now houses the Old Collection (pre-1930), which is used for reference purposes only.

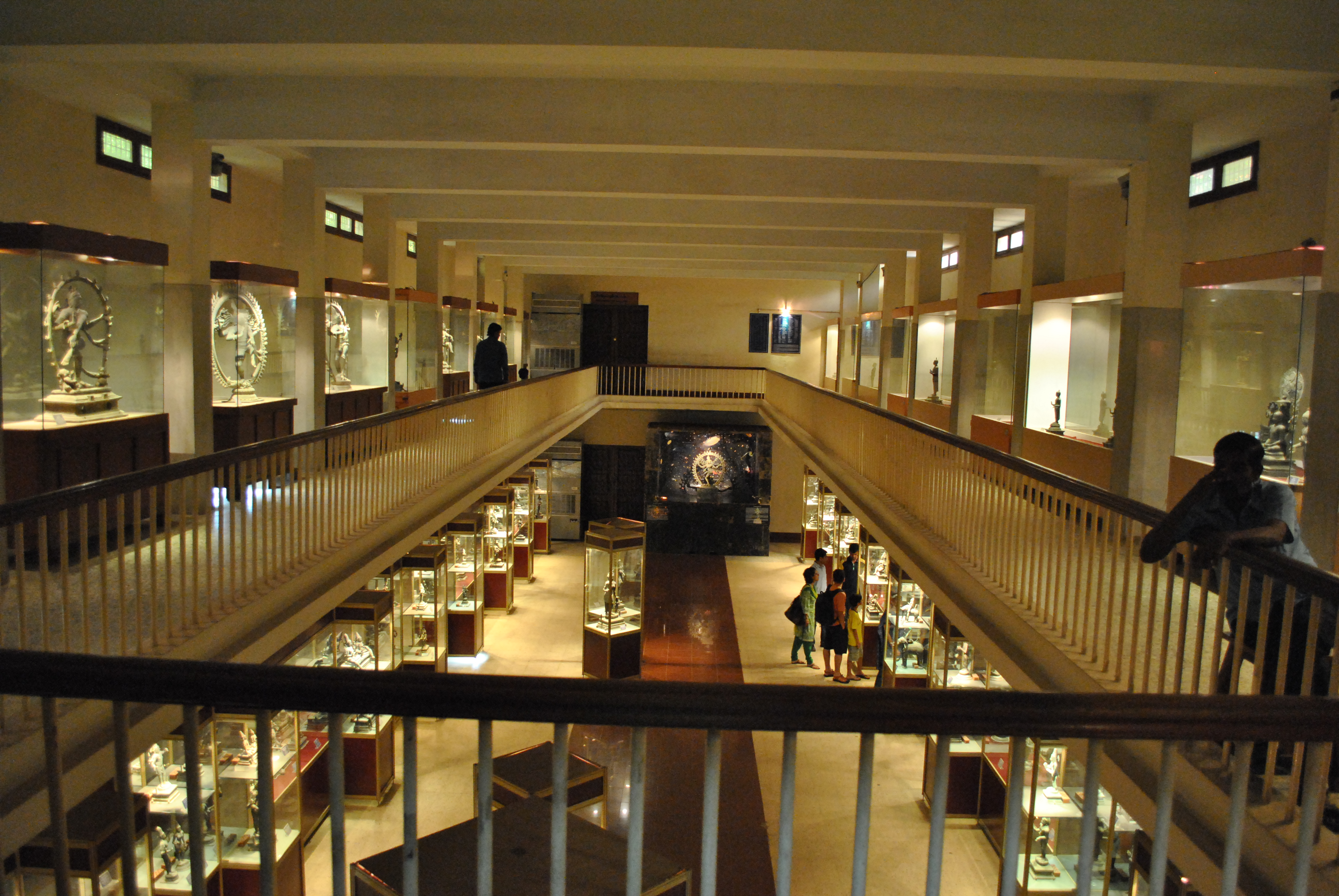
Gallery inside the museum

Both the museum and the library benefited greatly from the efforts of the Madras Literary Society, the Oriental Manuscripts Library and the Records Office. The museum houses a 19th-century theatre, with the "pit" meant for those who can afford more and seating for the rest of the audience in tiered-seats arranged in a semi-circle around the pit. Restoration to mark the 150th anniversary of the museum replaced 25 fans with air-conditioning.

The museum's collections had its origin from a gift of a collection of 1,100 geological specimens by the Madras Literary Society to the Government in 1851. The museum, the first government-sponsored one in the country, opened the same year on the first floor of the college of Fort St. George, adjacent to the Literary Society in Nungambakkam, with an exhibit of nearly 20,000 freely gifted specimens ranging from rocks to books. These gifts were in response to a public invitation that did not have a cut-off date. When the mounting collection of geological specimens threatened the stability of this first floor, the museum's first officer-in-charge, Surgeon Edward Balfour, who was then president of the Literary Society and serving the museum in an honorary capacity, suggested moving to a new building, which was materialised in 1854 with the move to the Pantheon. A library and a reading room were provided for the public in 1859. In 1864, an upper storey was added to the Pantheon in sympathetic style, giving the museum more elbow room. The library got a new block, now known as the centenary exhibition hall of the museum after restoration, in the northwest corner of the Pantheon in 1876, with a lecture hall. By 1896, there had been built new buildings for the museum (where the anthropological and arms galleries are presently located), the Connemara Library and the museum theatre.

The museum grounds also housed the first zoo of Madras in 1855, which was also established by Balfour. A year later, it had over 300 animals, including mammals, birds and reptiles. The zoo was later made a separate institution and was shifted to the People's Park in 1863 where it remained, not growing very much, until it was moved to its present location at Vandalur in 1985.

An official website for the museum was launched on 25 October 2001 after the government sanctioned ₹0.5 million in 2000–2001.

=== List of superintendents/directors/commissioners ===
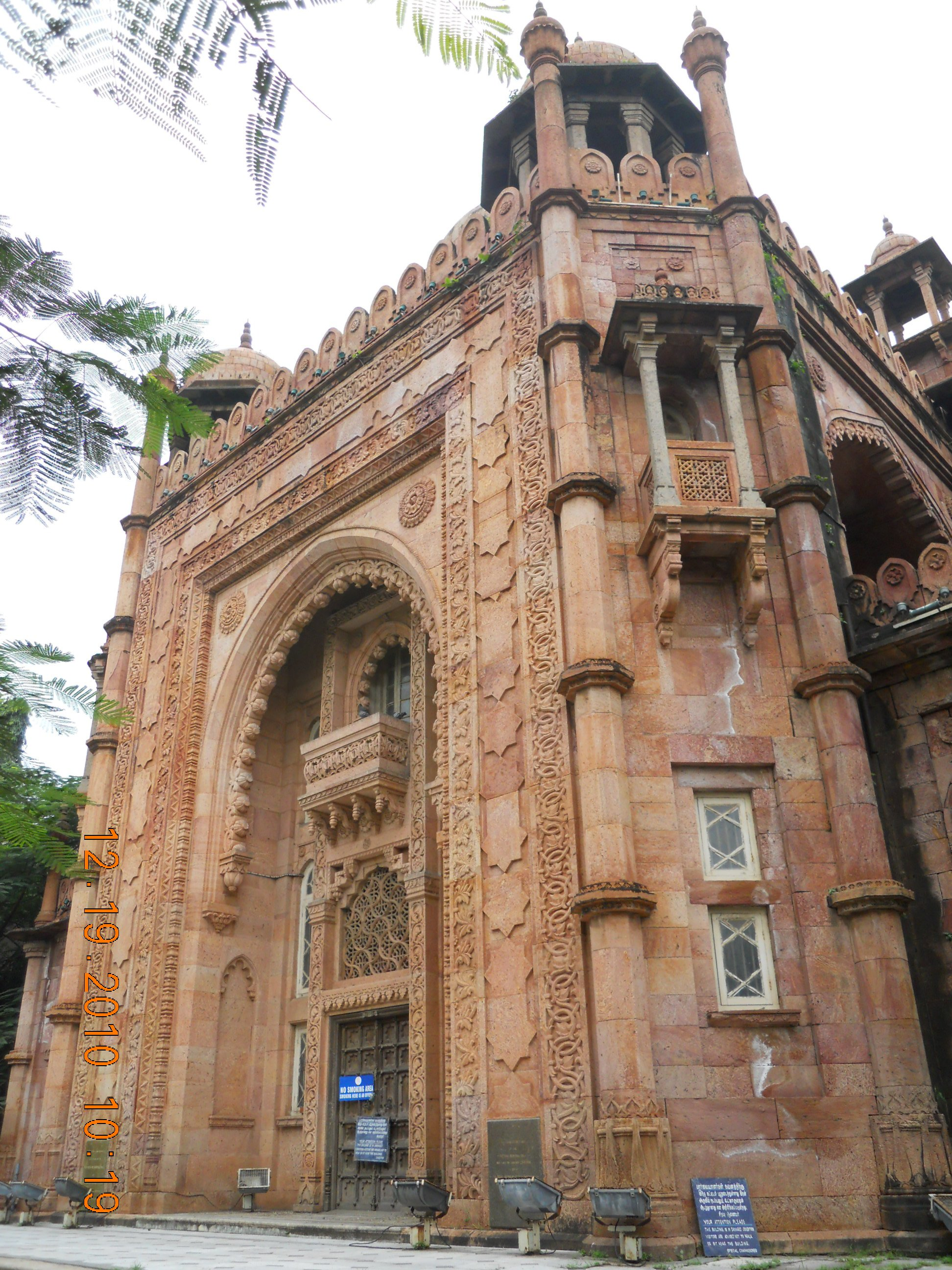
The National Art Gallery, one of the museum buildings

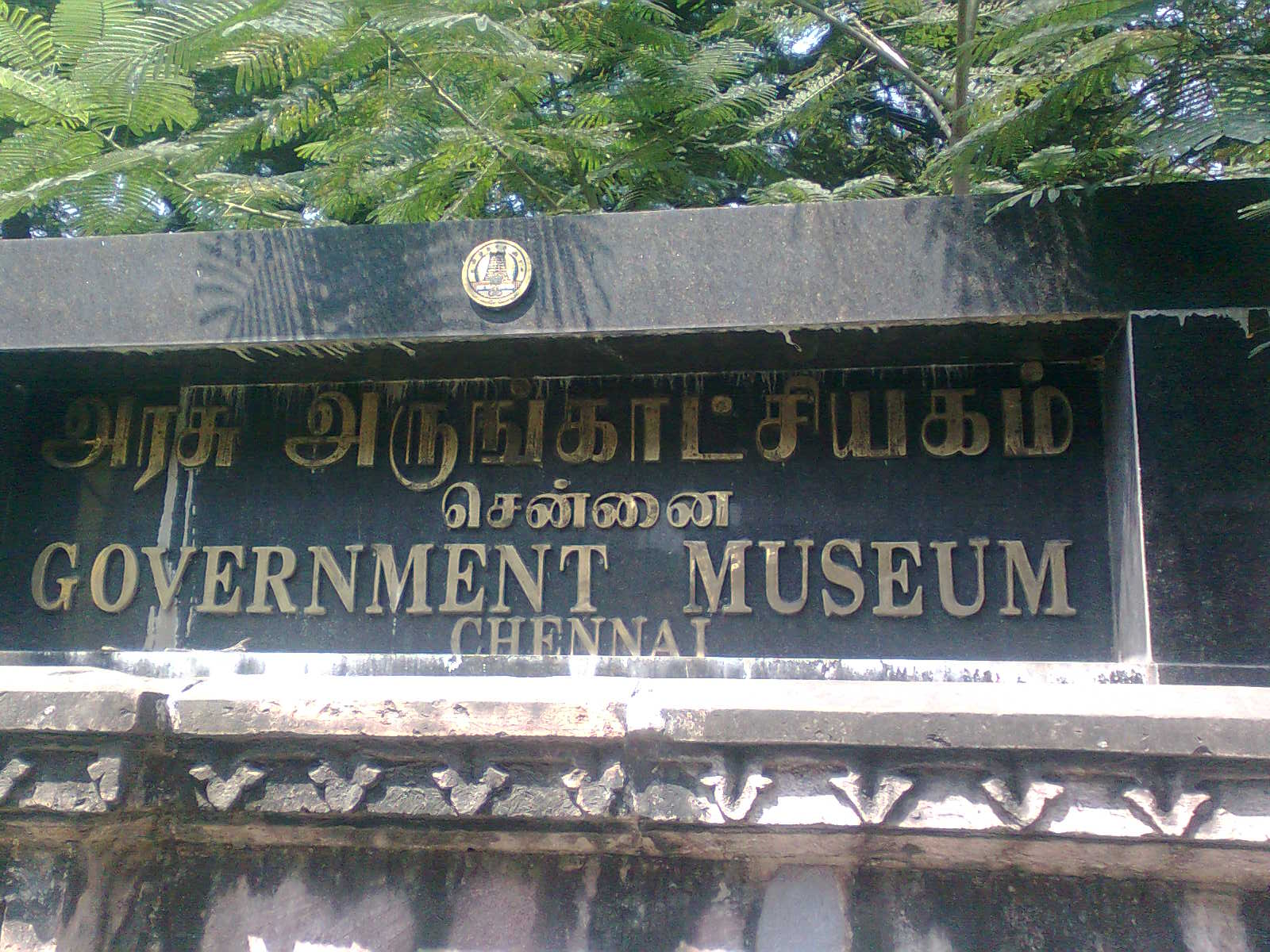
The entrance sign at the museum

S.No.	Name	Designation	Tenure
1	Edward Balfour	First officer in charge	1851–1859
2	Jesse Mitchell	Superintendent	1859–1872
3	George Bidie	Superintendent	1872–1884
4	Edgar Thurston	Superintendent	1885–1908
5	J. R. Henderson	Superintendent	1908–1919
6	F. H. Gravely	Superintendent	1920–1940
7	A. Aiyappan	Superintendent	1940–1975
8	S. T. Satyamurthi	Superintendent	1961–1978
9	N. Harinarayana	Director of museums	1978–1989
10	G. Kesavaram	Director of museums	1989–1991
11	M. Raman, I.A.S.	Commissioner of museums	1991–1993
12	T. R. Ramasamy, I.A.S.	Director of museums	1993
13	M. Ramu, I.A.S.	Commissioner of museums	1993–1995
14	Naresh Gupta, I.A.S.	Commissioner of museums	1995–1996
15	K. Dheenadayalan, I.A.S.	Commissioner of museums	1996–1997
16	S. Rangamani, I.A.S.	Principal commissioner	1997–1999
17	R. Kannan, I.A.S.	Commissioner of museums	1999–2004
18	M. A. Siddique, I.A.S.	Director of museums	2004–2006
19	R. Kannan, I.A.S.	Special commissioner and commissioner of museums	2006–2007
20	Sitharam Gurumurthi, I.A.S.	Principal commissioner (additional charge)	2007
21	Shanthini Kapoor, I.A.S.	Principal secretary/Commissioner of museums	2007–2008
22	T. S. Sridhar, I.A.S.	Principal secretary/Commissioner of museums	2008–2011
23	S. S. Jawahar, I.A.S.	Commissioner of museums	2011-2013
24	R. Kannan, I.A.S.	Principal Secretary/Commissioner of museums (Additional Charge)	2013
25	P. R. Shampath, I.A.S.	Principal Secretary/Commissioner of museums	2013
26	R. Kannan, I.A.S.	Principal Secretary/Commissioner of museums (Additional Charge)	2013-2014
27	R. Kannan, I.A.S.	Additional Chief Secretary/ Commissioner of museums (Additional Charge)	2014-2015
28	D. Karthikeyan, I.A.S.	Commissioner (Additional Charge)	2015
29	D. Jagannathan, I.A.S.	Director of museums	2015-2017
30	Kavitha Ramu, I.A.S.	Director of museums	2017 -2018
31	Pinky Jowel, I.A.S.	Director of museums	2018
32	Kavitha Ramu, I.A.S.	Director of museums	2018-2019
33	T. Udhayachandran, I.A.S.	Director of museums	2019-2021
34	M. S. Shanmugam, I.A.S.	Commissioner of museums	2020-2021
35	T. P. Rajesh, I.A.S.	Director of museums	2021
36	S. A. Raman, I.A.S.	Director of museums	2021-2022
37	Sandeep Nanduri, I.A.S.	Director of museums	2022-2023
38	A. Suganthi, I.A.S.	Commissioner of Museums	2023
39	M. Arvind, I.A.S.	Commissioner of museums	2023-2024
40	Tmt Kavitha Ramu, I.A.S.	Director of museums	2024

== The museum complex ==
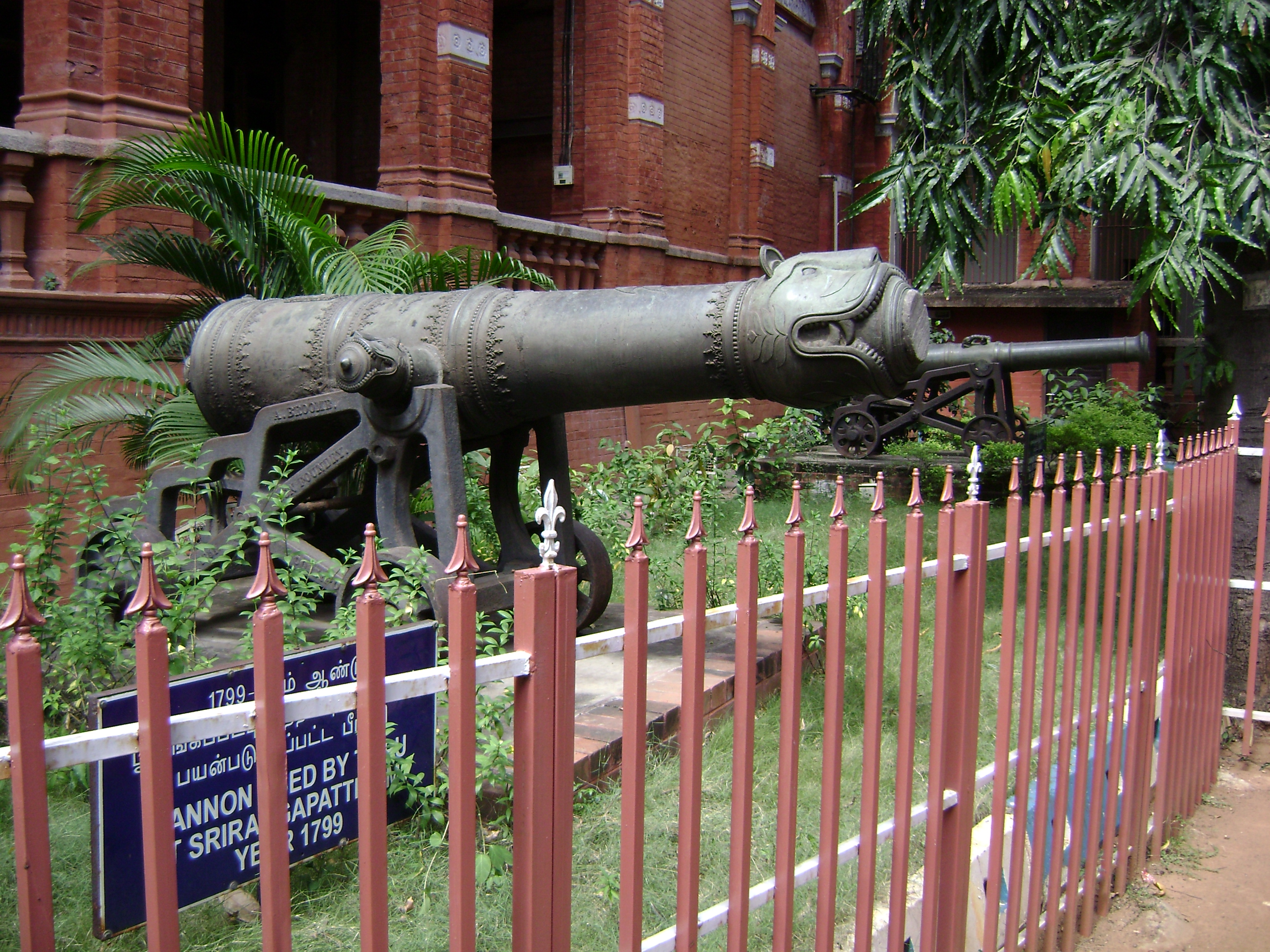
Canons at the museum complex

The museum complex consisting of six buildings and 46 galleries covers an area of around 16.25 acres (66,000 m^{2}) of land. The objects displayed in the museum cover a variety of artifacts and objects covering diverse fields including archeology, numismatics, zoology, natural history, sculptures, palm-leaf manuscripts, and Amravati paintings.

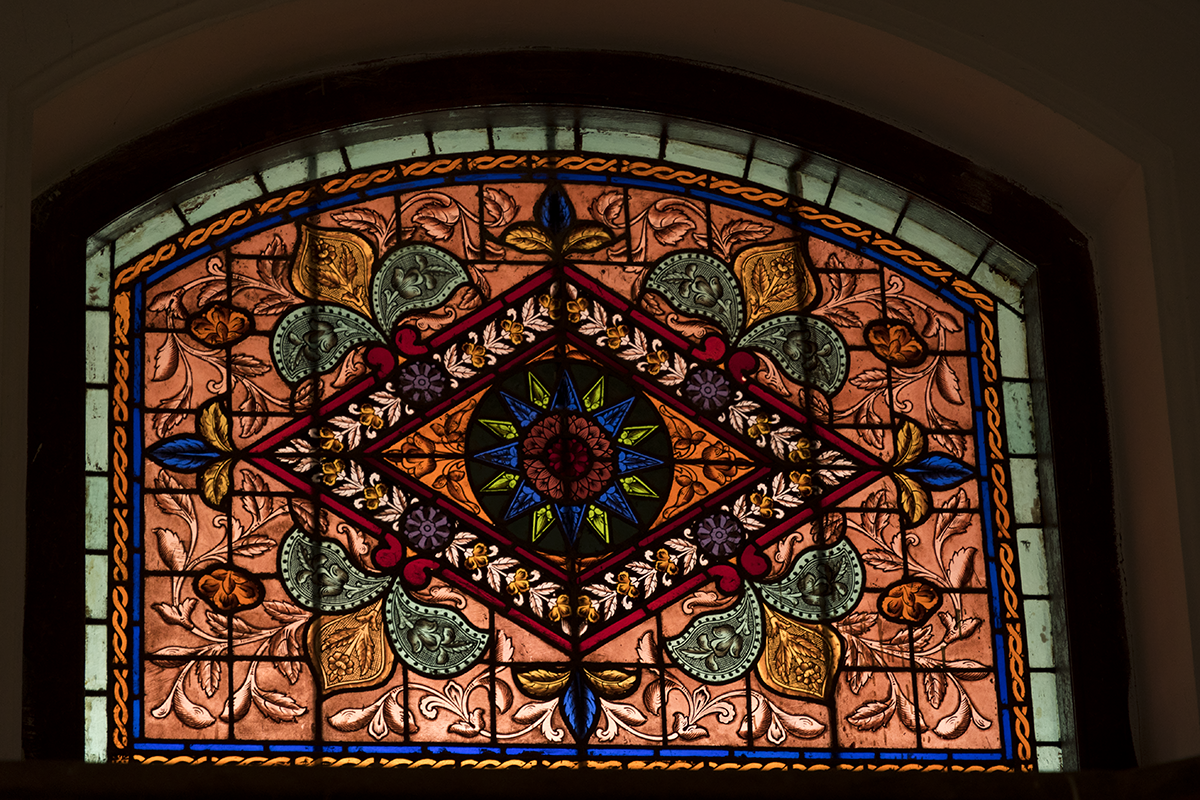
Window inside Government Museum, Chennai.

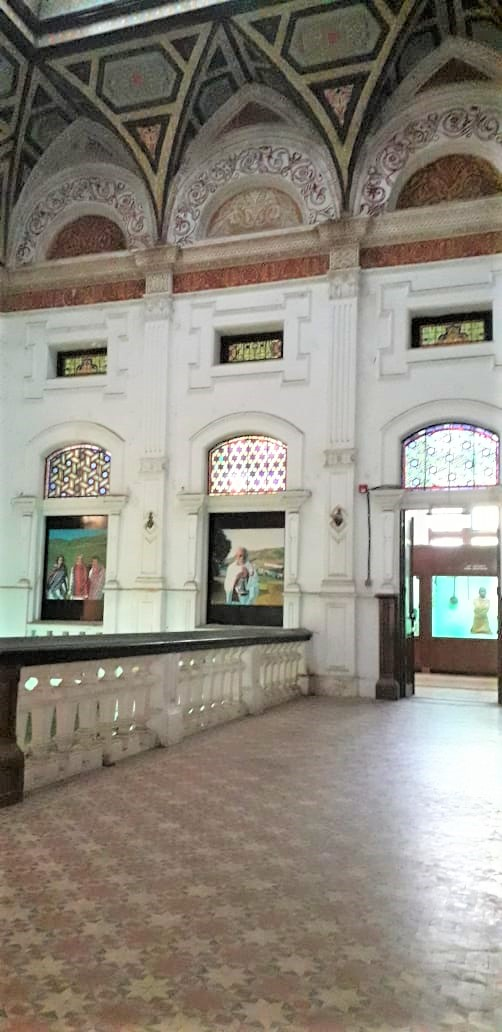
Inside of Chennai Museum.

Located close to the main museum entrance gates on Pantheon Road, the museum theatre is a rare specimen of the Italianate style of architecture, inspired by Classical architecture and developed in 1802 at Britain by John Nash. However, the theatre was built by the British in the late 19th century when this style was no longer popular in England. The structure has a high plinth and is accessed through a tall flight of stairs. It is primarily a semicircular structure with a rectangular wing at the rear. The latter wing now houses some of the galleries of the museum. The main hall is accessed through a verandah with a row of columns linked by semicircular arches. The walls and columns are embellished with floral and geometric designs.

The huge main hall was initially designed for staging theatrical performances. It has around 600 seats and a commodious stage and the actors' dressing rooms adjoin this stage.

During the British era, the theatre was mainly used for staging English plays preferred by the British elite of the city. Now, the museum has been using the theatre for its own cultural and academic programs such as art workshops, lectures and conferences. It also rents the hall for various cultural performances, mainly dramas. The hall has witnessed several plays including those of Shakespeare.

Since August 2004, the museum is also a designated "Manuscript Conservation Centre" (MCC) under the National Mission for Manuscripts established in 2003. The museum has taken preventive care of about 19,007 manuscripts and given curative conservation treatment to about 7,402 manuscripts.

The museum for children in the complex houses several static exhibits such as galleries of dolls adorned with costumes of various nations and civilisations and also exhibits pertaining to science, transportation, and technology.

== Visitors ==
As of 2013, the children's museum is visited by 1,000 people a day, and the number of visitors increases during weekends.

== The future ==
An air-conditioned 3D theatre, the first of its kind facility in a state museum, is under construction at the children's museum in the museum complex at a cost of ₹4 million. Equipments are to be provided by the National Council of Science Museums, Kolkata. The theatre will screen science-oriented films. It screen a 20-minute-long film and will play five shows a day. The project is expected to be completed by April 2013. There are also plans to upgrade the 3D theatre to a 5D one.

In 2018, the Department of Museums started evaluating bids for renovating the museum as part of an Asian Development Bank–funded scheme.

== Gallery ==
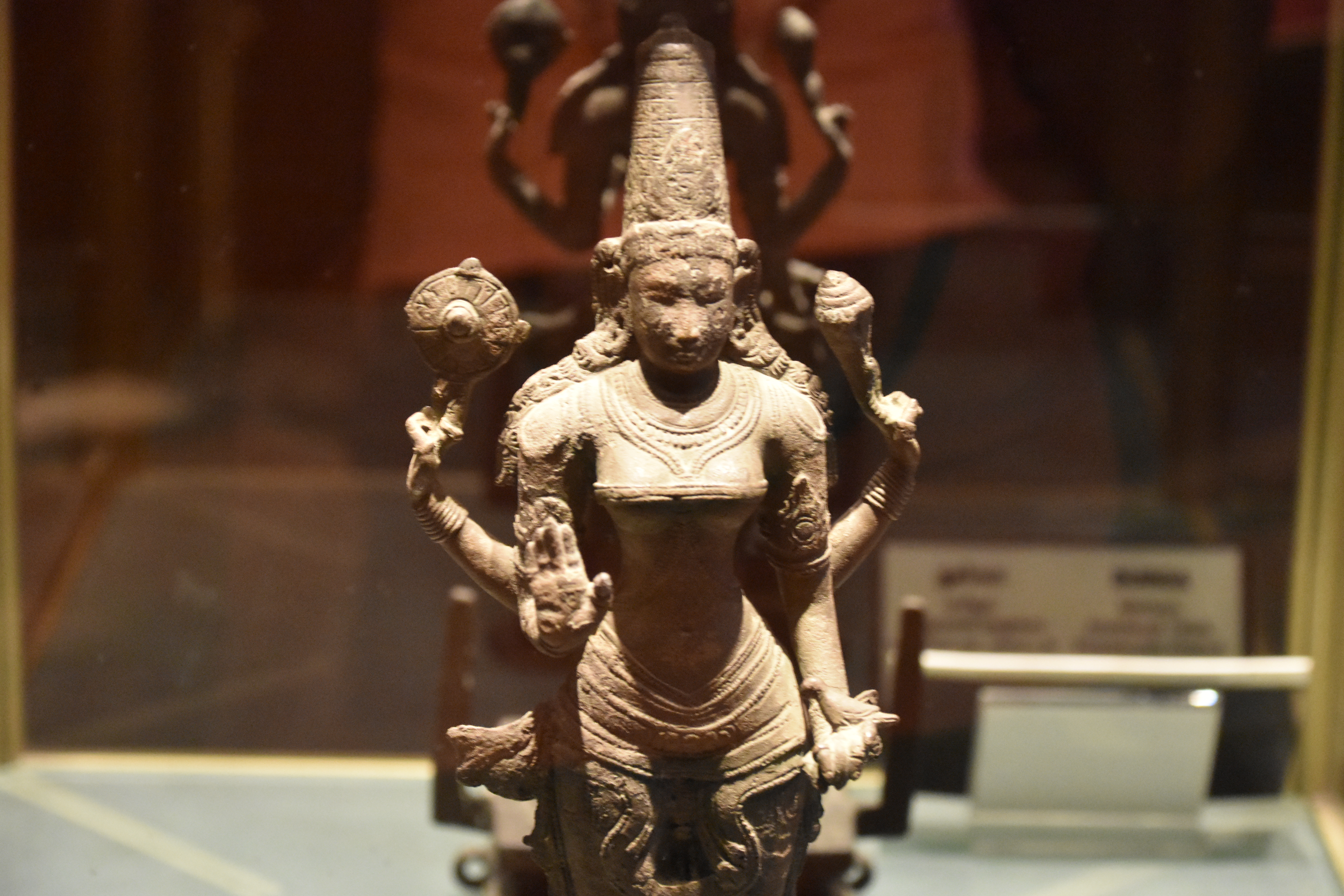
Sculpture of Vishnu in bronze from the Chola period

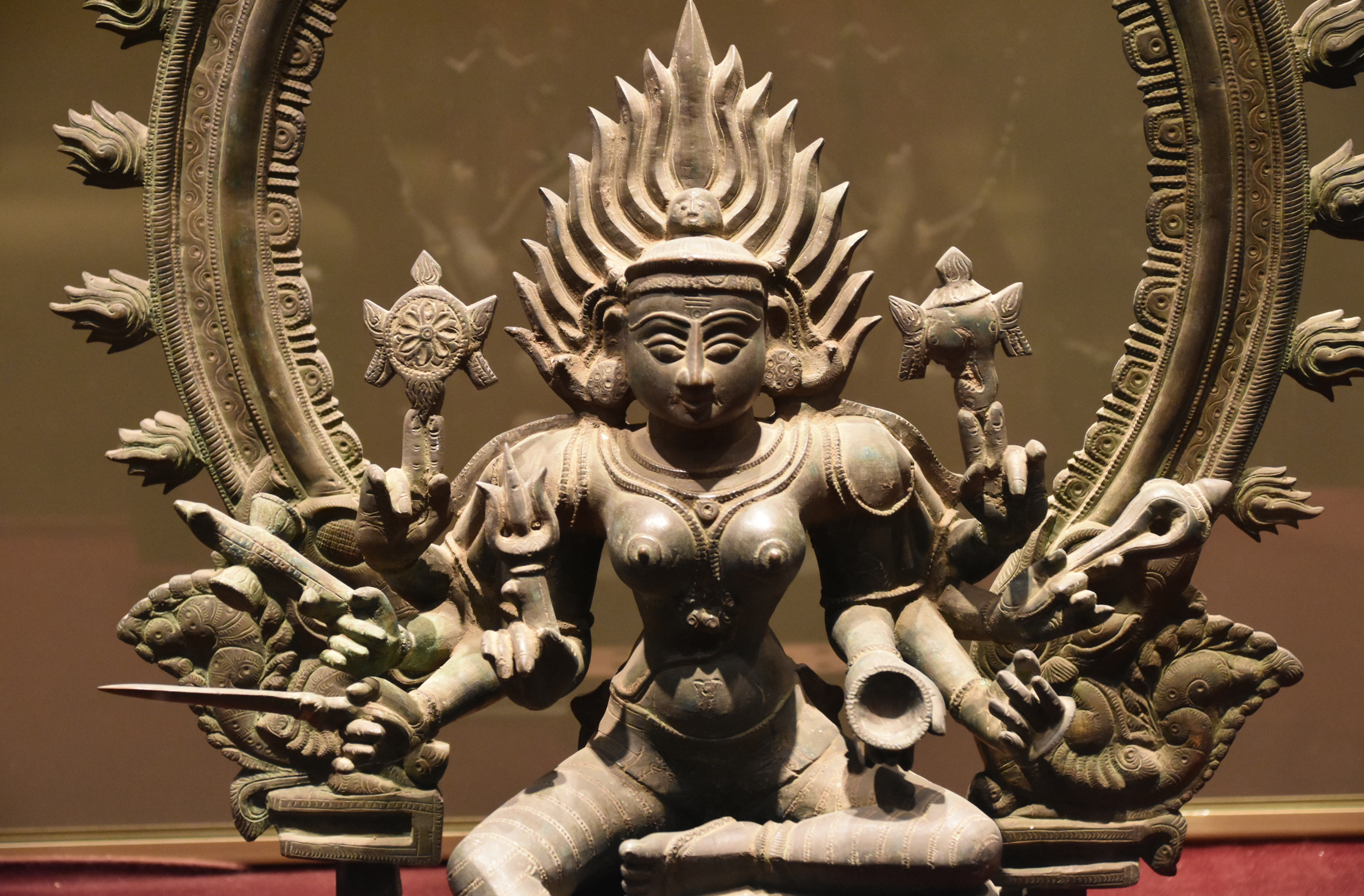
Sculpture of Bhadrakali in bronze from the 14th century CE

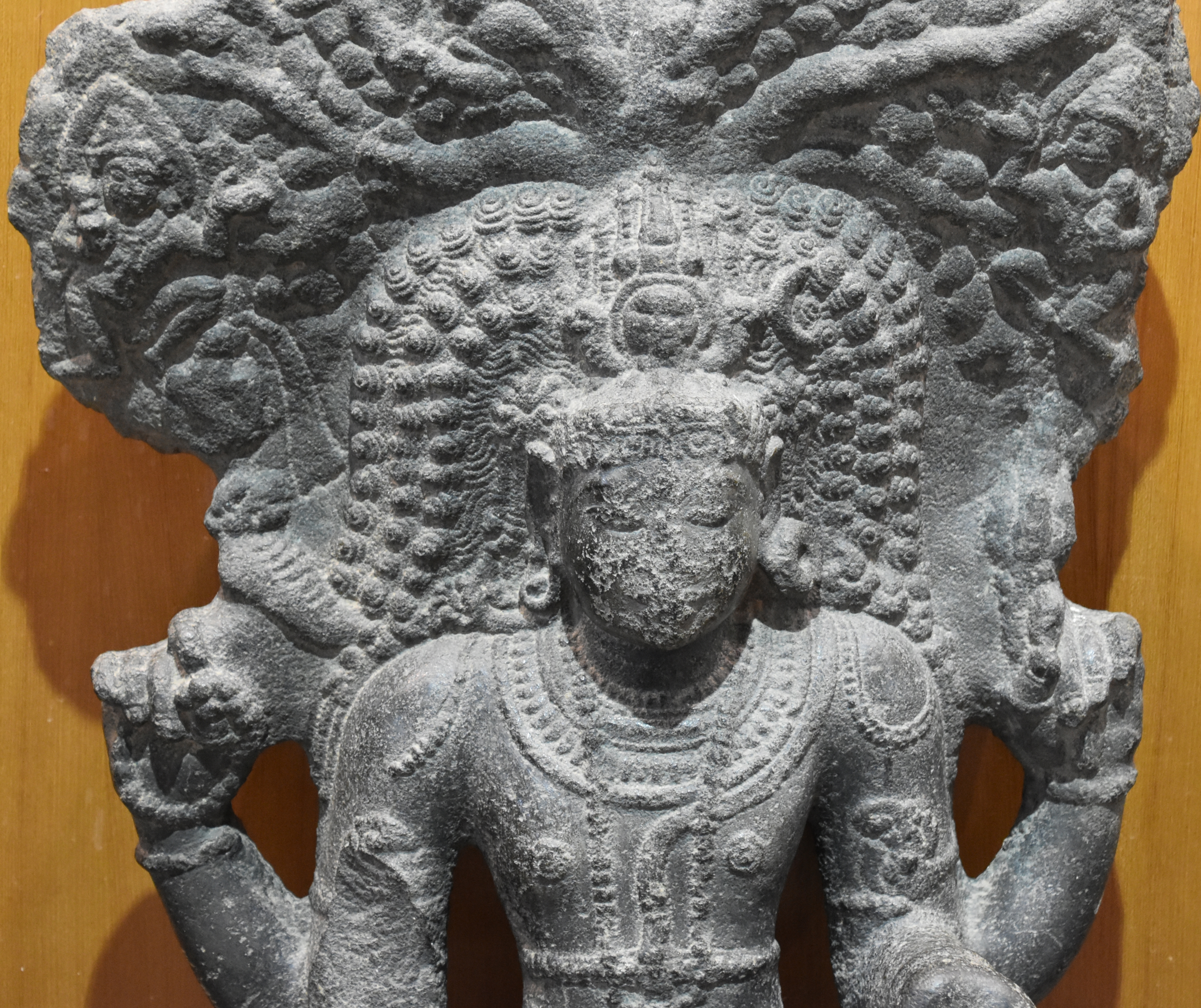
Sculpture of Dakshinamurthi from the Chola period, 12th century CE

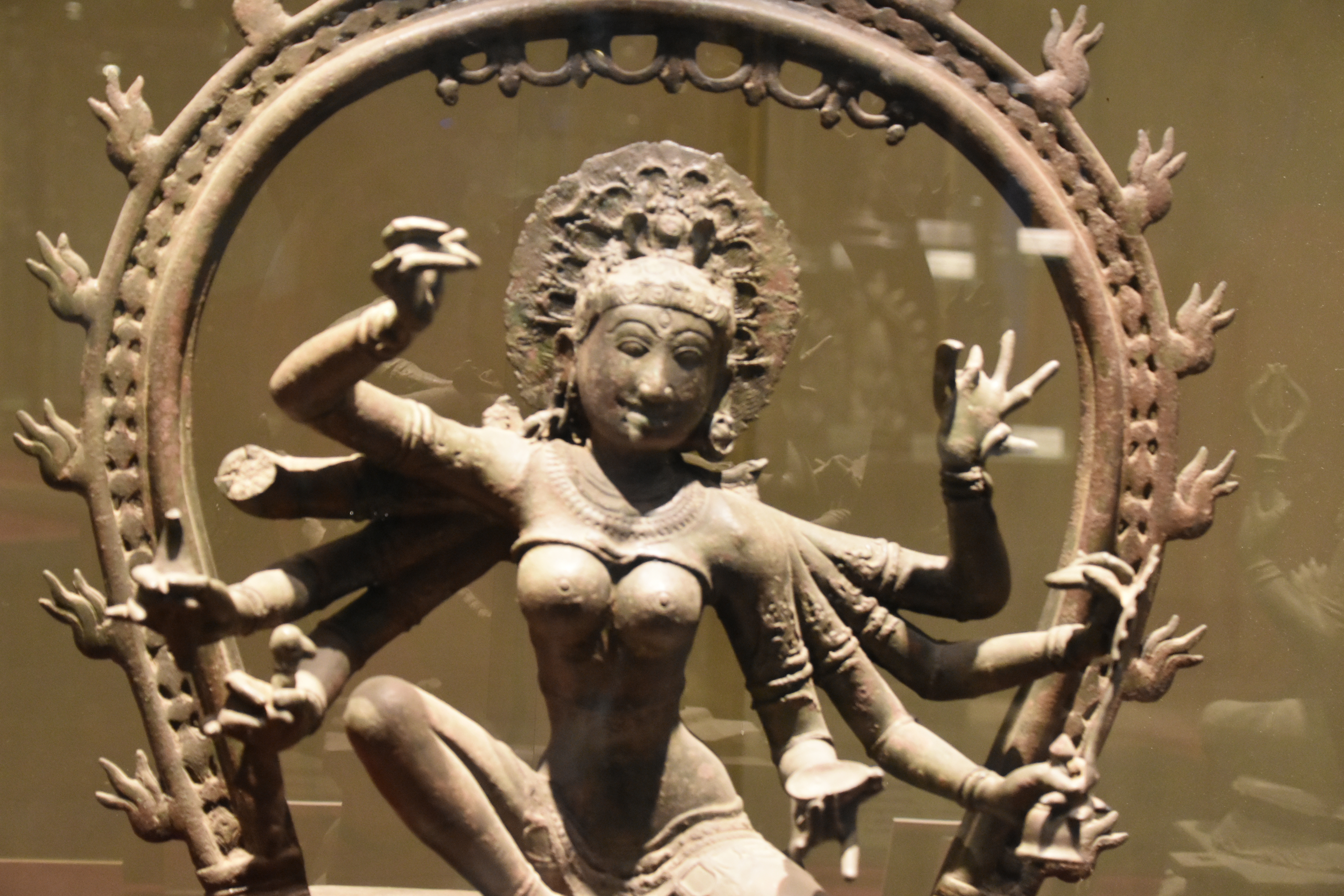
Sculpture of Mahishasuramardini in bronze from the Chola period, 11th century CE

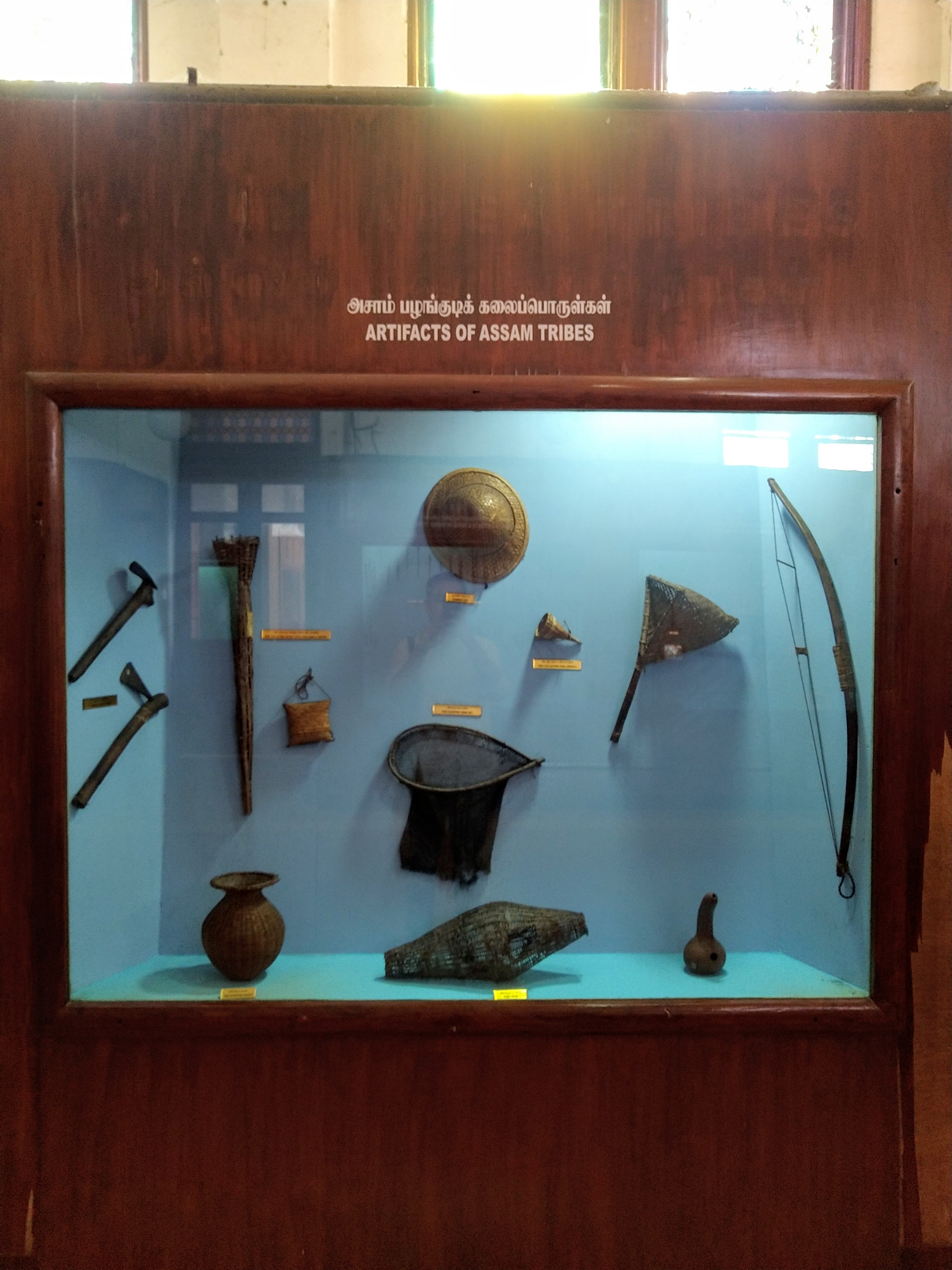
Tribal artifacts from Assam

== See also ==
- Cuddalore Government Museum
- Government Museum, Karur
- Government Museum, Pudukkottai
- Government Museum, Tiruchirappalli
- Government Museum, Salem
- Connemara Public Library
- Museum of Possibilities
- Tamil Nadu Police Museum
- List of Tamil Nadu Government Estates, Complexes, Buildings and Structures
- Heritage structures in Chennai
- Kottayam Coin Hoard
