= Jesse Mitchell =

British army officer

Captain Jesse Mitchell
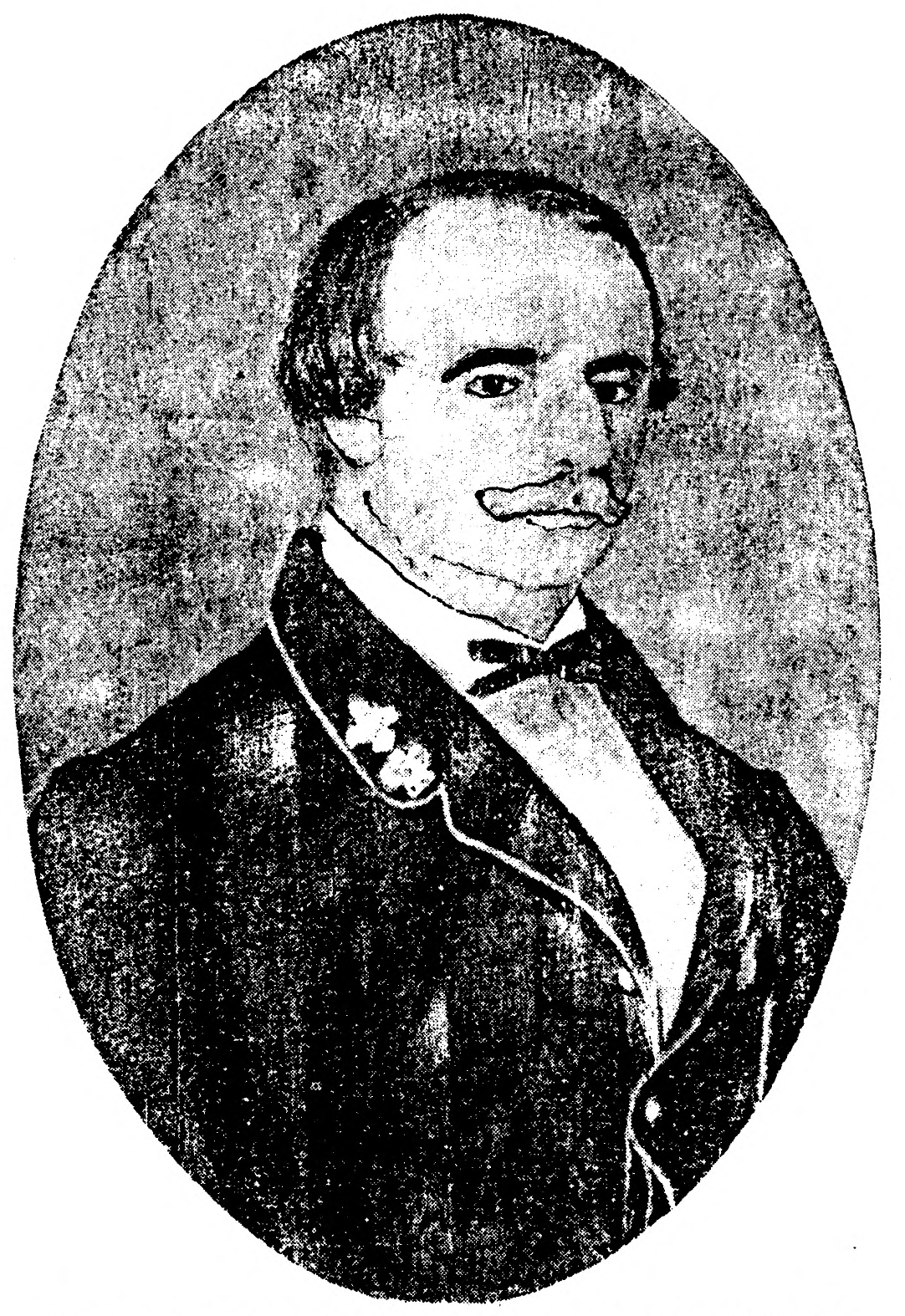

Superintendent of the Government Museum, Chennai
- In office 1859–1872
- Preceded by: Edward Balfour
- Succeeded by: George Bidie

Personal details
- Born: 1812 St. Mary's Whitechapel, Middlesex
- Died: 18 July 1872 (aged 59–60) Madras
- Profession: Soldier, museum curator

Captain Jesse Mitchell (1812 – July 18, 1872) was a British army officer who served as Superintendent of the Government Museum, Madras, succeeding Edward Balfour, from 15 May 1859 to 7 August 1872. He was one of the pioneers of photomicrography in India. Some of his early photographs include those of Phthiraptera from a goose and the proboscis of a blow-fly. He was a captain and an adjutant in the 1st Native veteran Battalion of the Indian Army. He exhibited his first photographs of old temples in 1857 at a meeting of the Photographic Society of Bengal, which also earned praise in the Madras Journal of Literature and Science. In 1858 he showed some negatives at a meeting of the Photographic Society of Madras. He wrote on the photographic techniques that he experimented with and suggested modifications to those followed by Captain Linnaeus Tripe and Dr. A.C. Brisbane Neill. He also published notes from the museum such as one on the Indian climbing perch and its habit.

Mitchell helped establish the Museum Library which later became the Connemara Public Library, acquiring books, often second-hand to stock it. It was opened in June 1862. Mitchell died while in service and is buried at St. George's Cathedral, Madras.
