= Connemara Public Library =

Public library in Chennai, India

Coordinates: 13°04′14″N 80°15′24″E

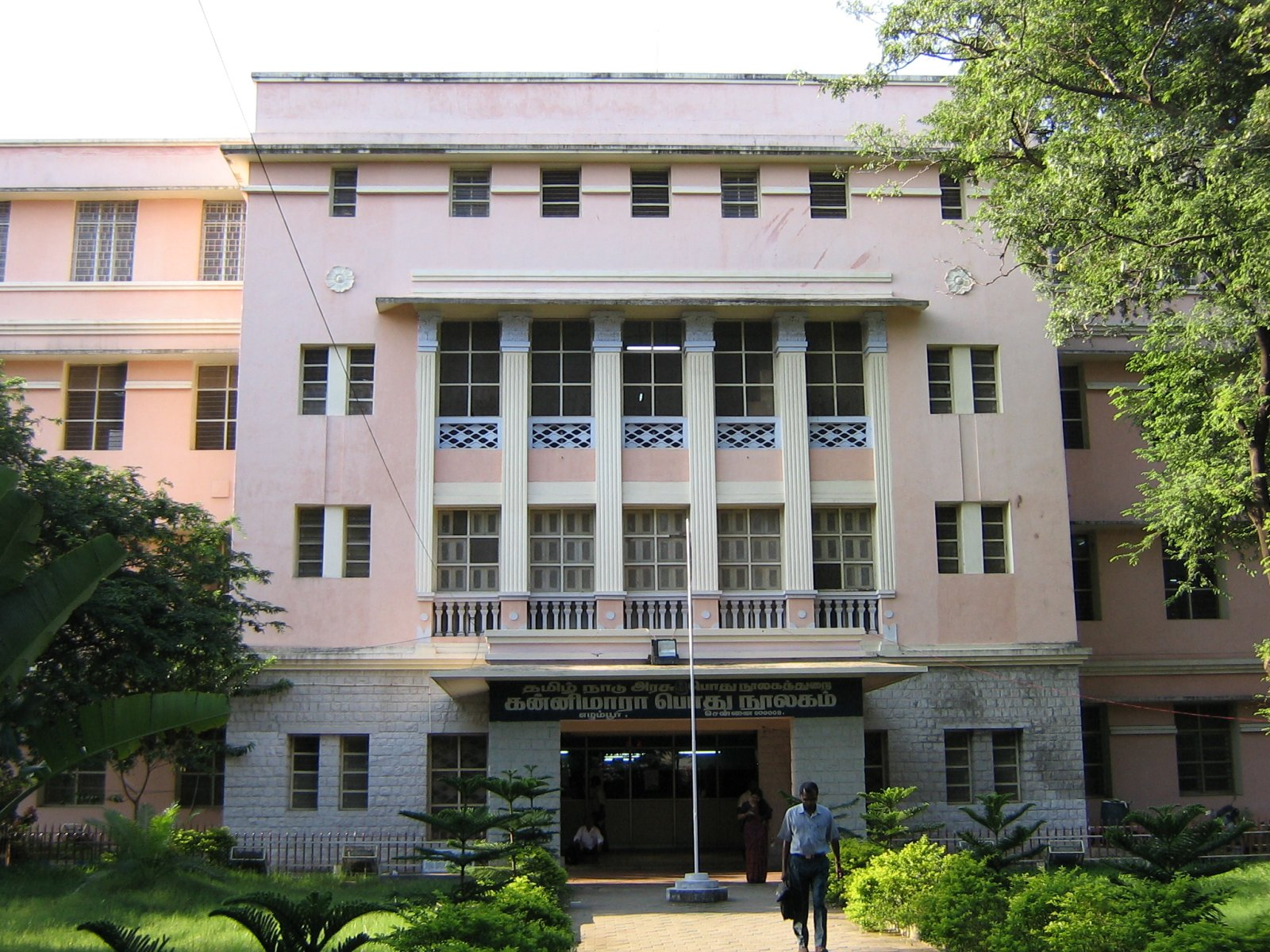
- Entrance of Connemara Public Library
- Location: Egmore, Chennai, Tamil Nadu, India
- Type: Public library
- Established: 5 December 1890 (135 years ago)

Collection
- Items collected: Books, academic journals, magazines, Braille books, manuscripts

The Connemara Public Library at Egmore in Chennai, Tamil Nadu, India, is one of the four National Depository Libraries which receive a copy of all books, newspapers and periodicals published in India. Established in 1890, and opened for public in 1896, the library is a repository of century-old publications, wherein lie some of the most respected works and collections in the history of the country. It also serves as a depository library for the United Nations. It is located in the Government Museum Complex on Pantheon Road, Egmore, which also houses the Government Museum and the National Art Gallery.

== History ==
The library's beginnings go back to 1860, when Captain Jesse Mitchell set up a small library as part of the Madras Museum in Madras, capital of the Madras Presidency in the British Indian Empire. Hundreds of books had been found to be surplus in the libraries of Haileybury College (where civil servants of the Indian Civil Service were trained in Hertford Heath, Hertfordshire) and these were sent to the Madras Government, which in turn handed them over to the Madras Museum. Conceived on the lines of the British Museum Library, it was part of the Madras Museum until 1890, when the need for a free public library prompted the then Governor of Madras, Lord Connemara, to lay the foundation on 22 March 1890. It opened in 1896 and was named after Lord Connemara (by then the former Governor), an Anglo-Irish nobleman. The library was indeed essentially free: A small deposit had to be paid but this was refundable. It became the state central library in 1948, with the enactment of Madras Public Libraries Act 1948, which was the first concerted effort in India to institutionalise, structure, otherwise co-ordinate and organise public library services. This is one of Asia's largest libraries.

The library was part of a cultural complex that grew in the grounds of what was once called The Pantheon. The entire complex now boasts buildings that reflect architectural unity, even while demonstrating the various stages of Indo-Saracenic development, from Gothic-neo-Byzantine to Rajput Mughal and Southern Hindu Deccani.

The new building, which was added to the library in 1973, has a vast collection of books, a much sought-after textbook section, a periodicals hall, a reference room, a video room, an entire floor for books from the Indian languages, a Braille Library and an IAS study centre. Efforts are on to fully computerise the library database, which could ensure easy access to books. The library has a collection of over 600,000 books.

In 1981 the central government ordered that the library became one of the four national depository libraries. The library, however, is not a registered member of the International Federation of Library Associations and Institutions (IFLA).

== Collections ==
The library, along with the Madras museum, benefited greatly from the effects of the Madras Literary Society, the Oriental Manuscripts Library and the Records Office. Under the provision of Delivery of Books and Newspapers (Public Libraries) Act 1954, every publisher in India has to compulsorily send a copy of each publication to the library. Apart from this a good number of publications and periodicals of UN and its specialized organs and Asian Development Bank were also received. Furthermore, several books were added every year by purchasing from the funds made available by the state government budget. The collection includes rare books including a 1608 Bible.

== Librarians ==
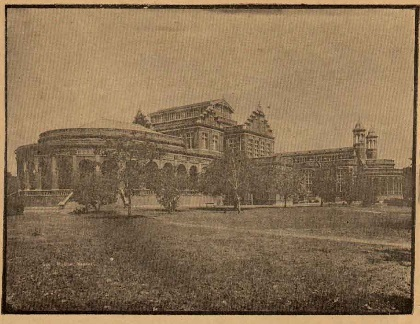
Connemara Public Library, c. 1914

S.No.	Name	Portrait	From	To	Remarks
01	Edgar Thurston	alt	1896	1908	
02	J. R. Henderson		4 December 1908	1920	
03	F. H. Gravely		1920 February	1939 April	
04	R. Janardhanam		1939 April	1950	First Indian and Trained Librarian
05	K. Govinda Menon		1950	1958	
06	K. Rajagopalan		1958	1963	
07	V. Thillainayagam		1963	31 July 1972	First Professional Librarian
08	A. M. Sundararajan		31 July 1972		
09	C. K. Sundarajan				
10	A. M. Sundararajan				
11	N. Avudaiappan				
12	P.A. Naresh				
13	Dr Dharma Rajendiran		19 August 2013	2 February 2014	
14	T Munirathinam		3 February 2014	30 June 2015	
15	Sa Suganya		1 July 2015	1 November 2015	
16	P. Narayana Bhat		2 November 2015	30 April 2016	
17	P. Meenakshisundaram		1 May 2016	30 June 2018	
18	S. Rajani		2 July 2018	30 June 2019	
19	M. Ganesha		1 July 2019	1 February 2021	
20	K. Selvakumar		2 February 2021		

== Gallery ==
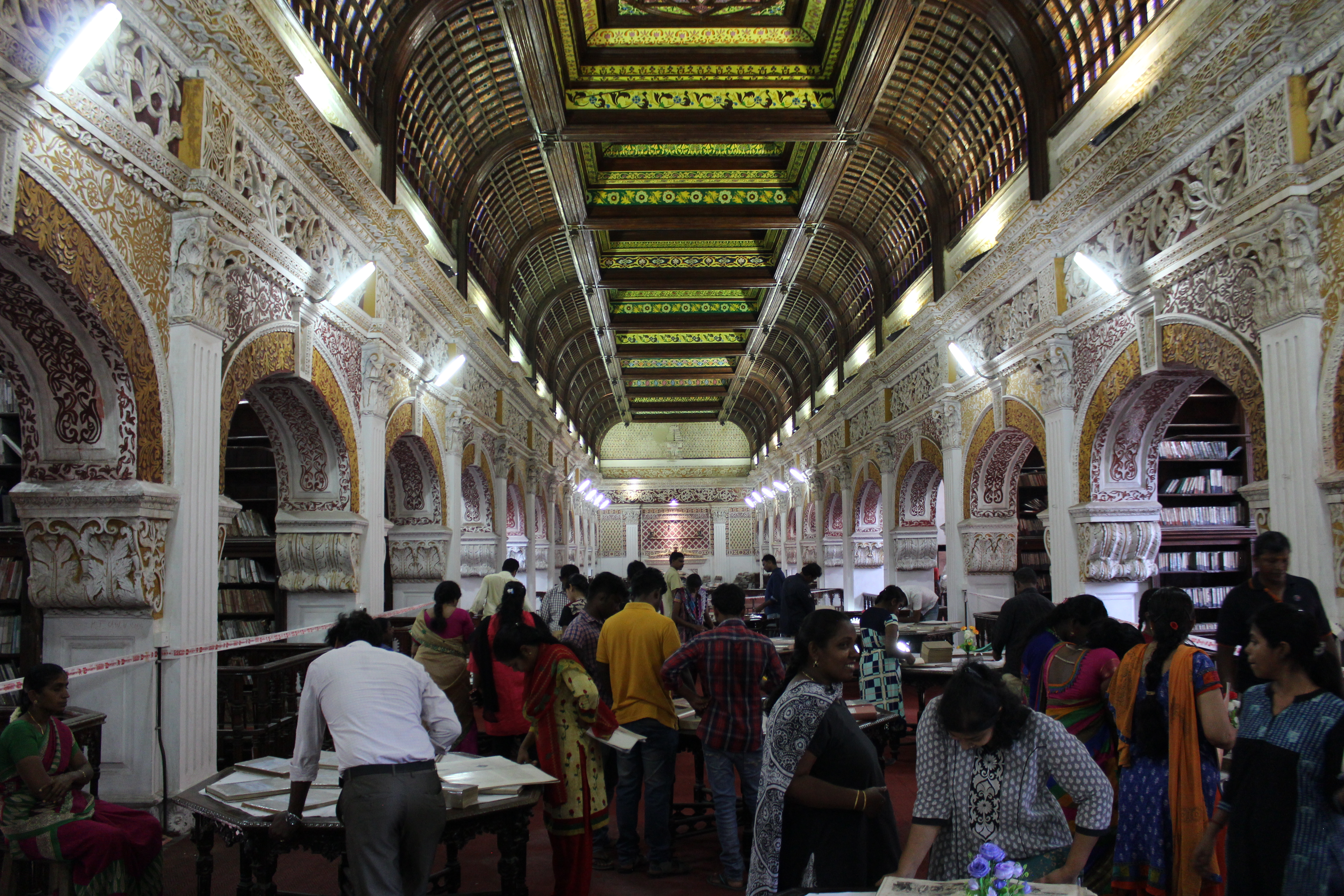

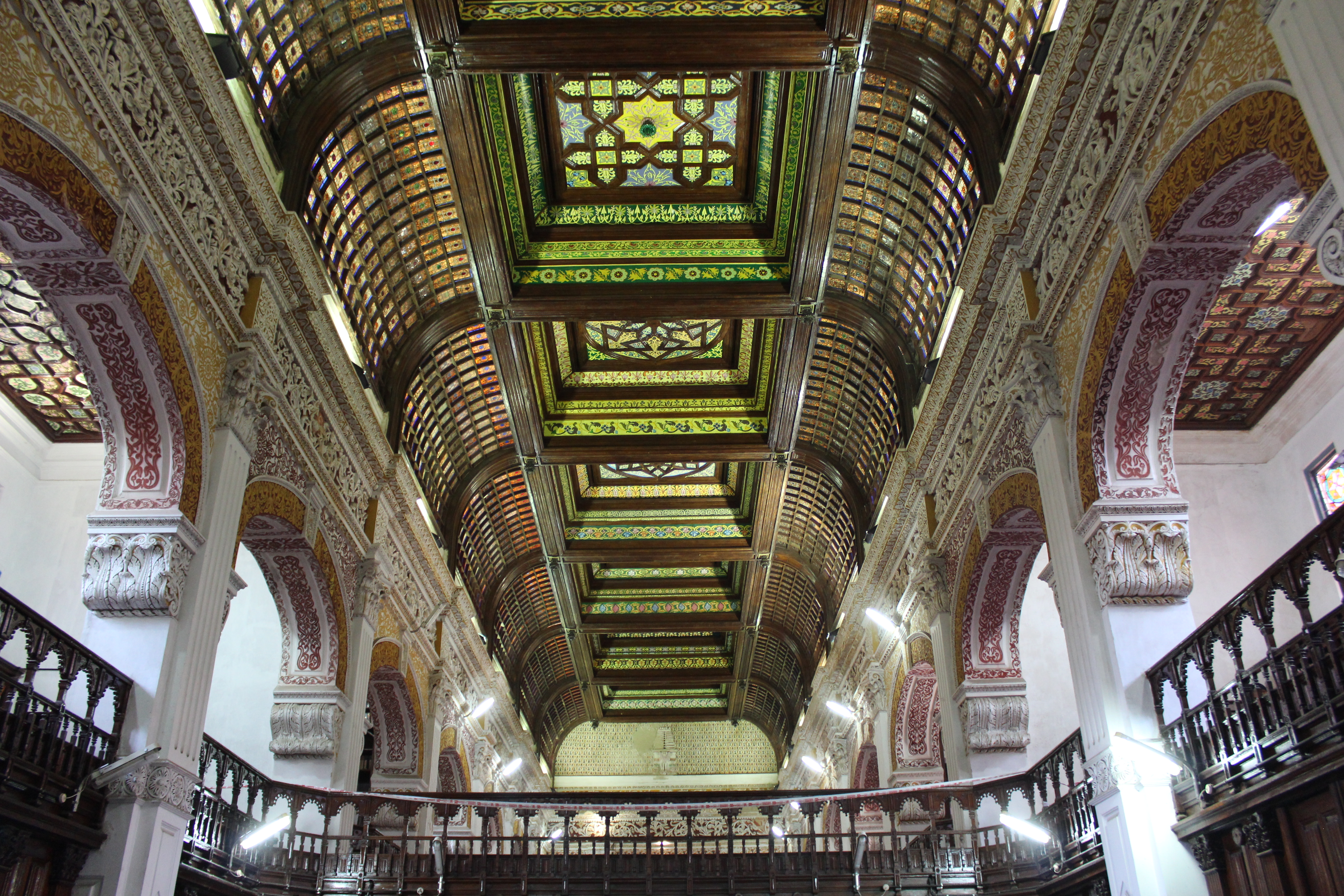

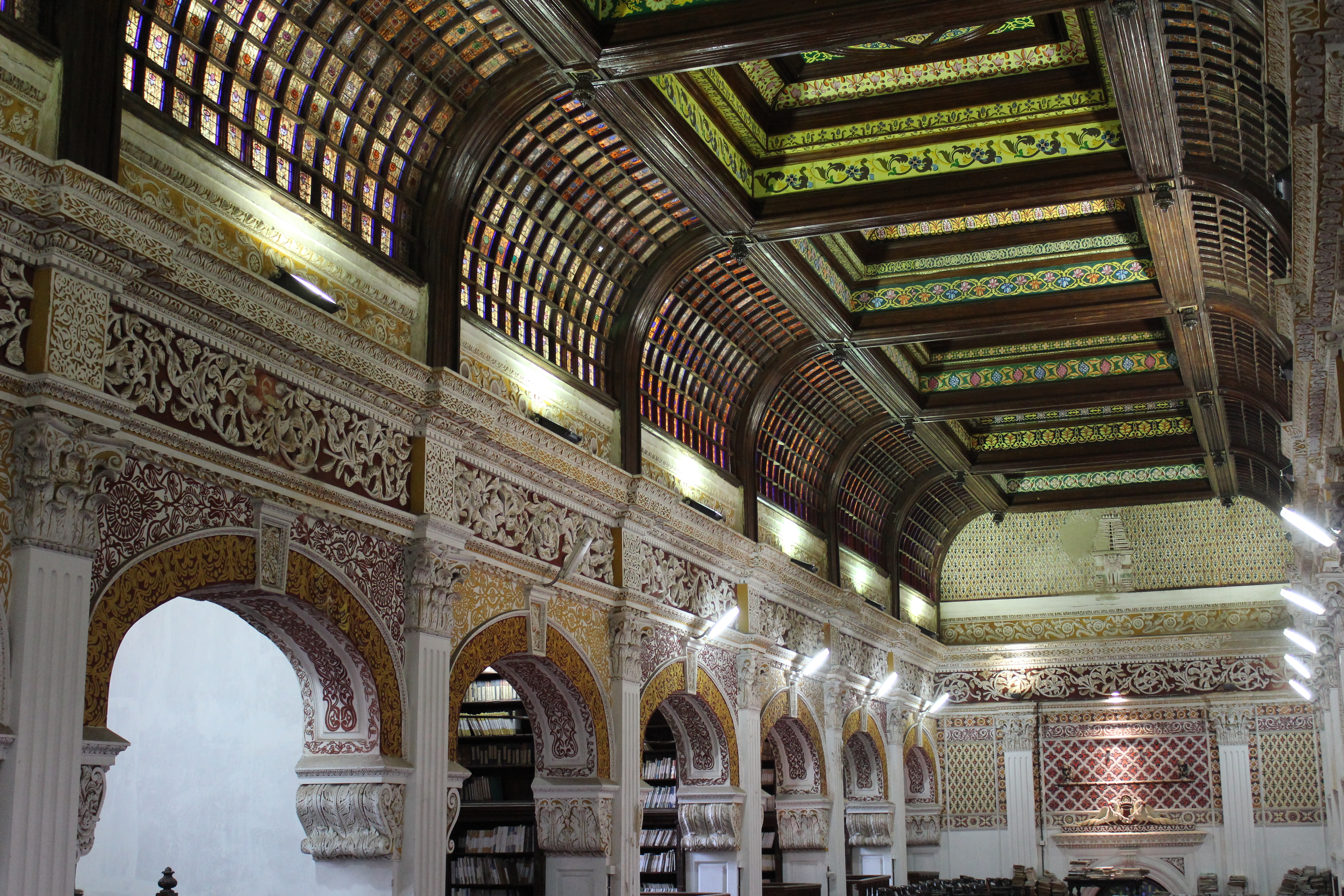

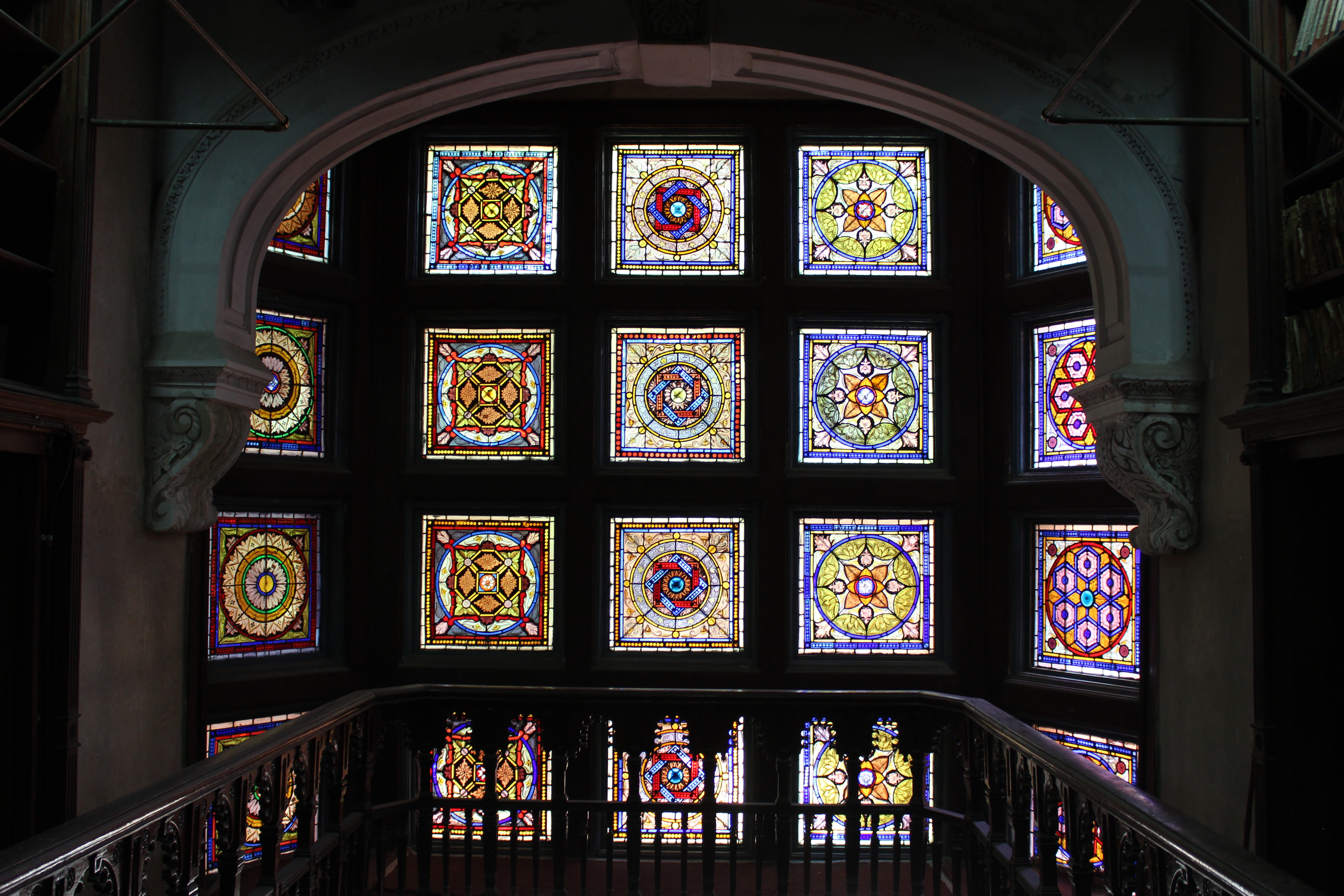

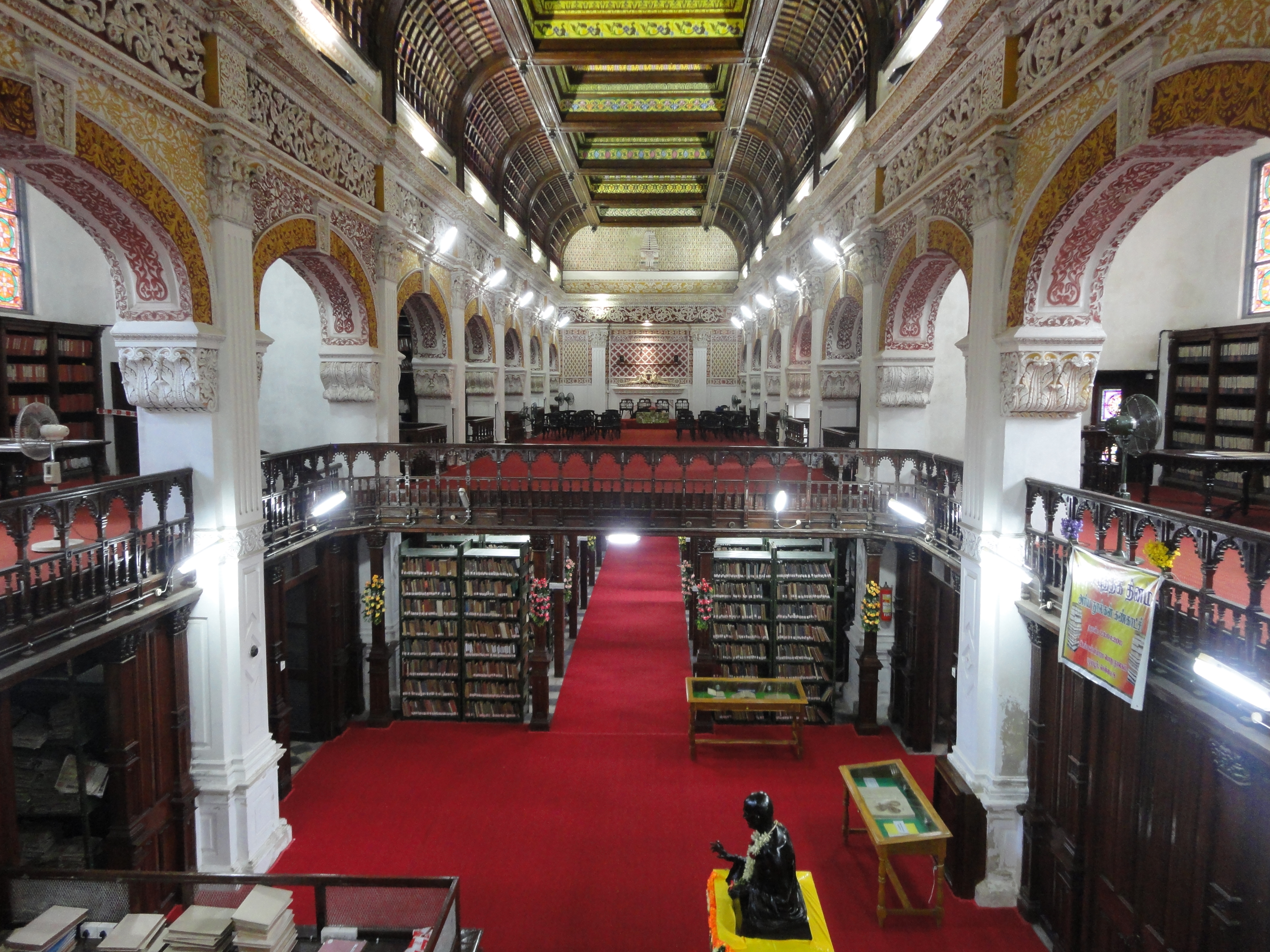

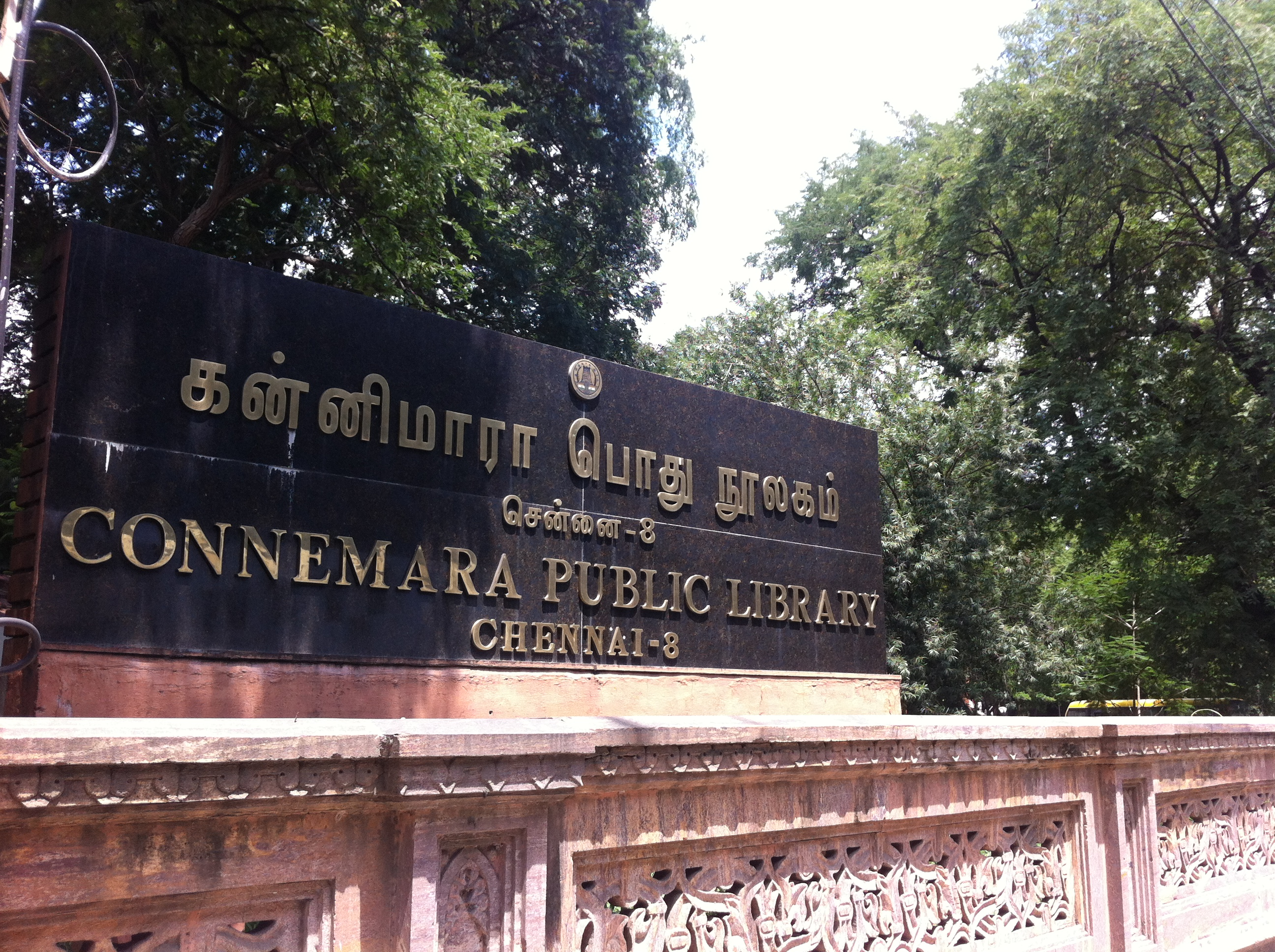

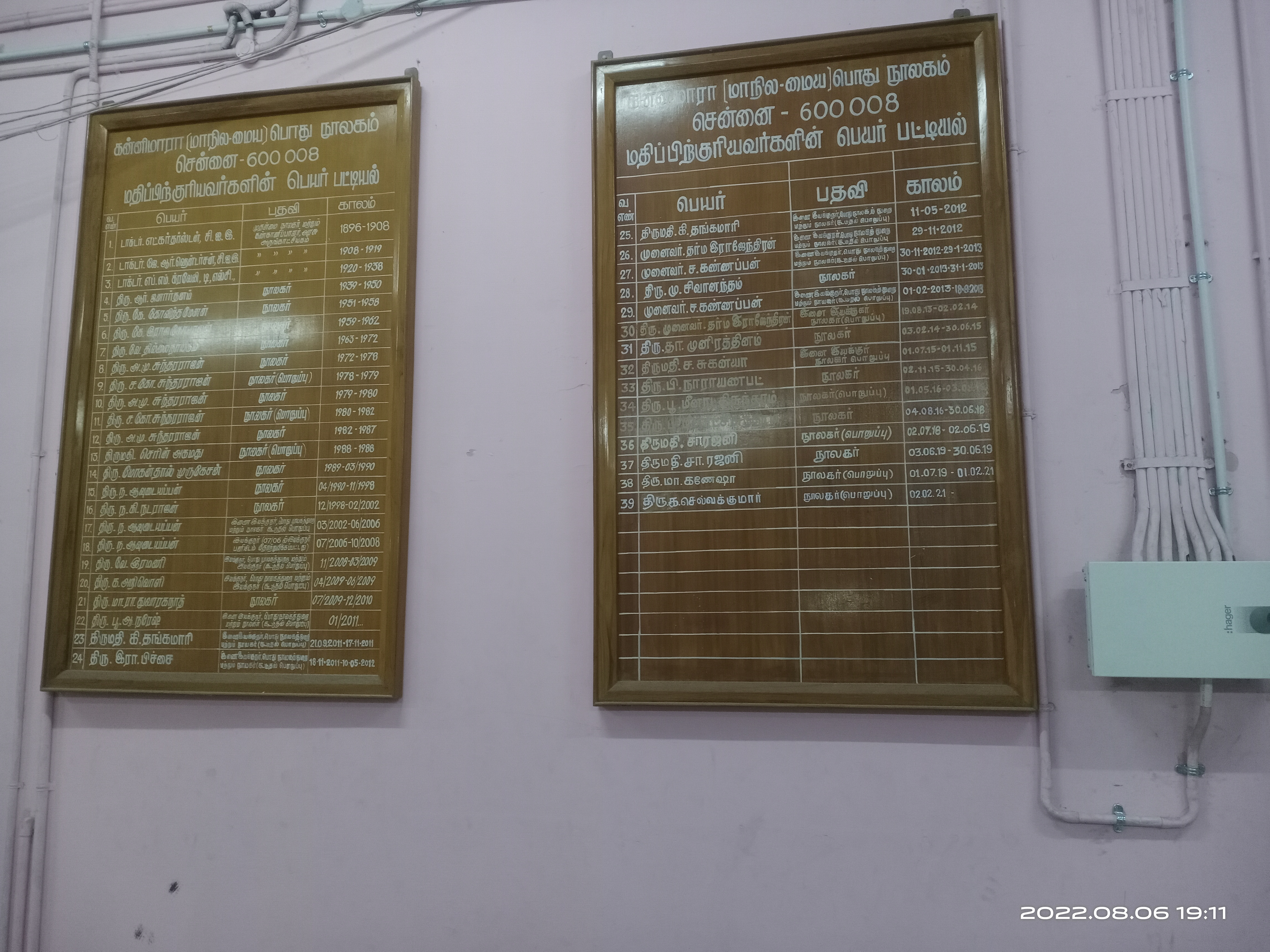

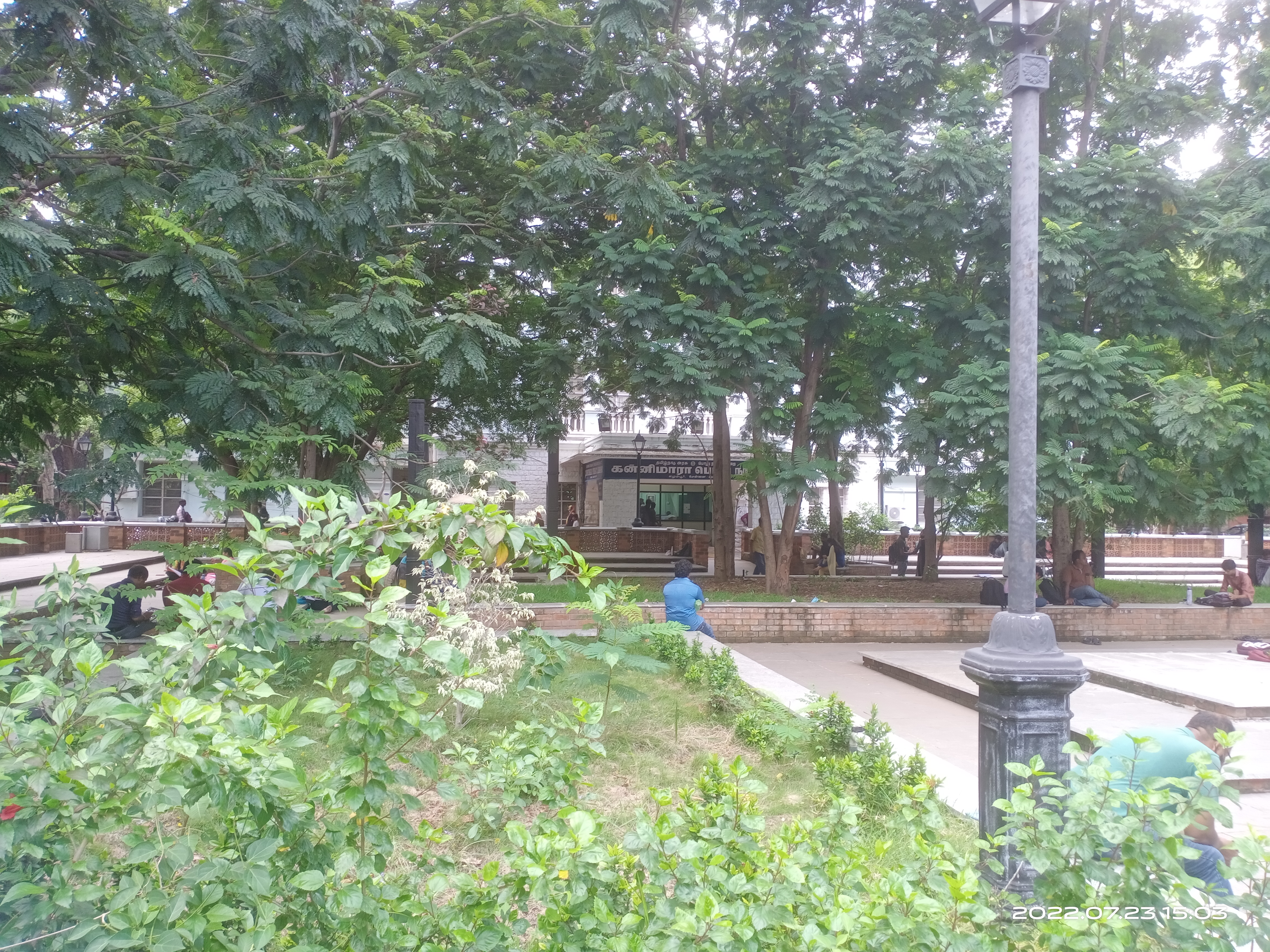

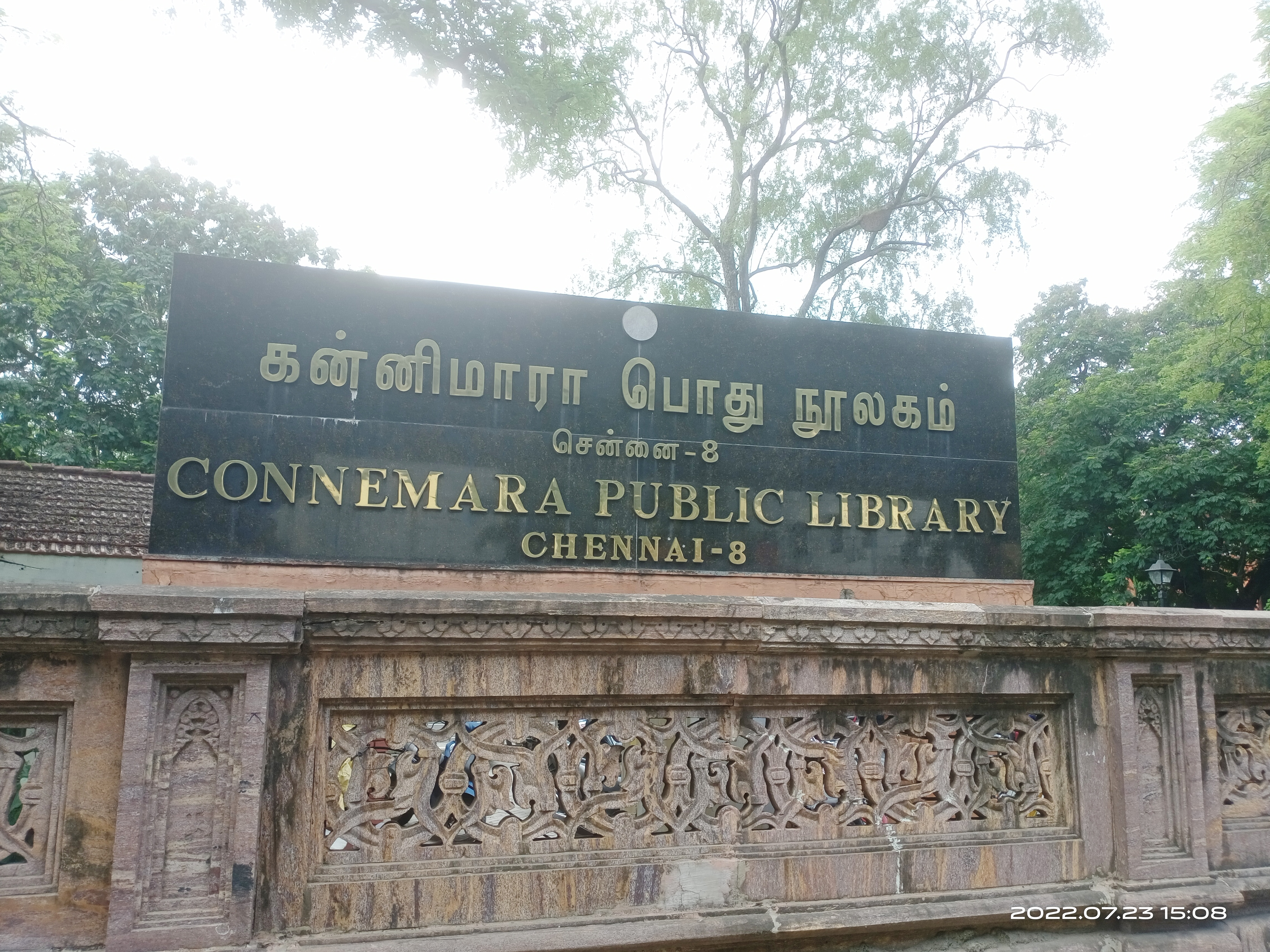

== See also ==
- Government Museum, Chennai
- Anna Centenary Library
