= Museum of Possibilities =

Coordinates: 13.0467°N 80.2799°E

- Location within Chennai
- Established: 6 June 2022
- Location: Chennai, Tamil Nadu, India
- Type: Community museum
- Website: tnmop.in

The Museum of Possibilities, is a museum for the people with disabilities located in Chennai, Tamil Nadu. It is an initiative by the Department of Welfare of Differently Abled Persons of Government of Tamil Nadu. It showcases accessible devices, assistive technologies and model accessible home.
