= Government Museum =

Government Museum may refer to these museums in India:

- Government Museum, Alwar, Alwar, Rajasthan, India
- Government Museum, Bengaluru, Bengaluru, Karnataka, India
- Government Museum, Chennai, Chennai, Tamil Nadu, India
- Government Museum, Erode, Erode, Tamil Nadu, India
- Government Museum, Kalaburagi, Kalaburagi, Karnataka, India
- Government Museum, Karur, Karur, Tamil Nadu, India
- Government Museum, Mathura, Mathura, Uttar Pradesh, India
- Government Museum, Tiruchirappalli, Tiruchirappalli, Tamil Nadu, India
- Cuddalore Government Museum, Cuddalore, Tamil Nadu, India
- Government Museum, Pudukkottai, Pudukkottai, Tamil Nadu, India
- Government Museum, Salem, Salem, Tamil Nadu, India
- Government Museum (Shivappa Nayaka Palace), Shimoga, Shimoga, Karnataka, India
