= List of properties of the government of Tamil Nadu =

List of Tamil Nadu Government Estates, Complexes, Buildings and Structures

Agency overview
- Jurisdiction: Tamil Nadu
- Headquarters: Chennai
- Website: Official website

Here's a list of properties of the government of Tamil Nadu, India.

- Official website
- Periyar EVR Building, 690, Anna Salai, Nandanam, Chennai-600 035
- Tamil Nadu Government Multi Super Speciality Hospital
- Chief Secretariat of Tamil Nadu
- Thalamuthu Natarajan Building
- N V Natarajan Maaligai
- Ezhilagam
- Kuralagam Buildings
- Valluvar Kottam
- Raj Bhavan (Chennai)
- Raj Bhavan (Ooty)
- Bharathiyar Illam
- Kamaraj Memorial House
- Government Museum, Chennai
- Government Museum, Salem
- Cuddalore Government Museum
- Government Museum, Karur
- Government Museum, Pudukkottai
- Government Museum, Tiruchirappalli
- Ripon Building
- Thendral Valaagam, Kumarasamy Raja Salai (Greenways Road)
- Panagal Maaligai
- Anna Centenary Library
- Chepauk Palace
- Connemara Public Library
- Tamil Nadu Police Museum
- Anna Memorial
- M.G.R. and Amma Memorial
- NPKRR Maaligai
- CMDA Towers
- Aavin Illam
- TIIC Building, No.692, Anna Salai, Nandanam Chennai - 600 035
- L.L.A. Buildings, No.735, Anna Salai, Chennai– 600002
- "Balasundaram Buildings". 350, Pantheon Road, Egmore, Chennai – 600 008
- TNPCB Building, 76, Anna Salai, Guindy Chennai 600 032
- Pallavan House, Anna Salai, Chennai - 600 002.
- TNPHC Building, 132, EVR Salai, Kilpauk, Chennai 600 010
- TNHB Shopping Complex,
- CMWSSB Buildings, No 1, Pumping Station Road, Chindatripet, Chennai 600 002
- Poomalai Commercial Complexes present all Over Tamil Nadu
- M. Singaravelar Maligai, 32, Rajaji Salai, Chennai 600 001
- Thiruvarangam', No.143, PS Kumaraswamy Raja Salai (Greenways Road), Chennai 600 028
- Tufidco Powerfin Tower, 490/3-4, Nandanam, Anna Salai, Nandanam, Chennai - 600035
- "Mahizhampoo", 163/1, P.S. Kumarasamy Raja Salai (Greenways Road) Chennai - 600 028
- DMS Compound, 359, Anna Salai, Chennai 600 006
  - DMS Annex Buildings
- DPI Complex, College Road, Chennai-600 006
- Tamil Nadu Administrative Tribunal
- Tamil Nadu Public Service Commission
- Tamil Nadu Information Commission
- State Vigilance Commission
- Tamil Nadu Tribunal for Disciplinary Proceedings - There are 4 Tribunals for Disciplinary Proceedings. They are located at Chennai, Coimbatore, Tiruchirappalli and Madurai
- Tamil Nadu Secretariat Training Institute (STI), Chennai
- Anna Institute of Management (AIM)
- Group A&B Wing Foundation Course Training Institute, Chennai
- All India Civil Services Coaching Center, Chennai
- The Civil Service Training Institute, Bhavanisagar
