= Queenship of Mary Church, Chintadripet =

Coordinates: 13°04′40″N 80°16′01″E

Queenship of Mary Church parish in Chintadripet, Chennai, India, was started in 1904 when it was known as St. Lazarus Church. Earlier, it had been a sub-station of St. Anthony's Church, Pudupet. A new church was built in 1952 with the name Queenship of Mary; it was consecrated on 18, December 1955 by Auxiliary Bishop Francis Arthur Carvalho, of Madras and Mylapore. Under the supervision of Reverend M. V. Jacob, a new church was constructed on 1 October 2003. A grotto was built in commemoration of the centenary celebrations in 2004.

== History ==
The Queenship of Mary Church, then known as St. Lazarus Church, with about 2500 members, was erected in Madras (now Chennai), near the Ripon Building and the Corporation of Madras.

Originally, St. Lazarus was not meant to be a parish church. It was a chapel attached to St. Anthony's Church of Pudupet. The earliest references to this church, as a separate ecclesiastical unit, are from 1904, when it was raised to the status of a parochial church with the parish priest residing in Pudupet.

On the transfer of the spiritual jurisdiction in 1929 and division of Madras by the river Cooum, Madras and Mylapore became like two different cities. The churches on the eastern bank of the river were to be taken over by the Mylapore Diocese and those on the western side from part of the Archdiocese of Madras. While therefore Mylapore handed over one of the best city churches, Sacred Heart of Egmore, Mylapore got in return St. Lazarus of Chintadripet with St. Antony's of Narasingapuram, located on Ritchie's Street, close to Mount Road.

There were two St. Lazarus Churches, within the city. One in Mylapore close to Mae de Deus Church (the name Madras is derived from the name of this church), and the other in the slum area of Chintadripet. It is unknown why there were two churches in Madras dedicated to St. Lazarus. It is possible that a sense of rivalry brought into existence the St. Lazarus of Chintadripet, while the older one (which had grown in fame as a shrine where devotees flocked and still do come round every Tuesday) that one in Mylapore, as it is stated elsewhere, it may safely be assumed that it is now more than three centuries old, while that in Chintadripet is comparatively younger, having been built at the earliest in 1904.

As far as historical data go, owing to the absence of records, the origin and the early history of St. Lazarus Chintadripet is unknown. However, there is a strong tradition that St. Francis Xavier visited this parish.

=== Re-dedication ===
Originally this parish was dedicated to St. Lazarus, after the Second Vatican Council, it was rededicated to the Queenship of Mary on 18 December 1955, on the recommendations of the Sacred Congregation of Rites.

=== Revelation of Our Lady ===
The Most Holy and Miraculous Mother of Chintadripet is said to have revealed herself to a poor Hindu lady, Mrs. Devi, who lived in the slum adjacent to the church, at 11:00 am, on 14 August 2007.
