= Fort St. George =

Fort in Chennai, India

- Part of Tamil Nadu
- Chennai, Tamil Nadu, India
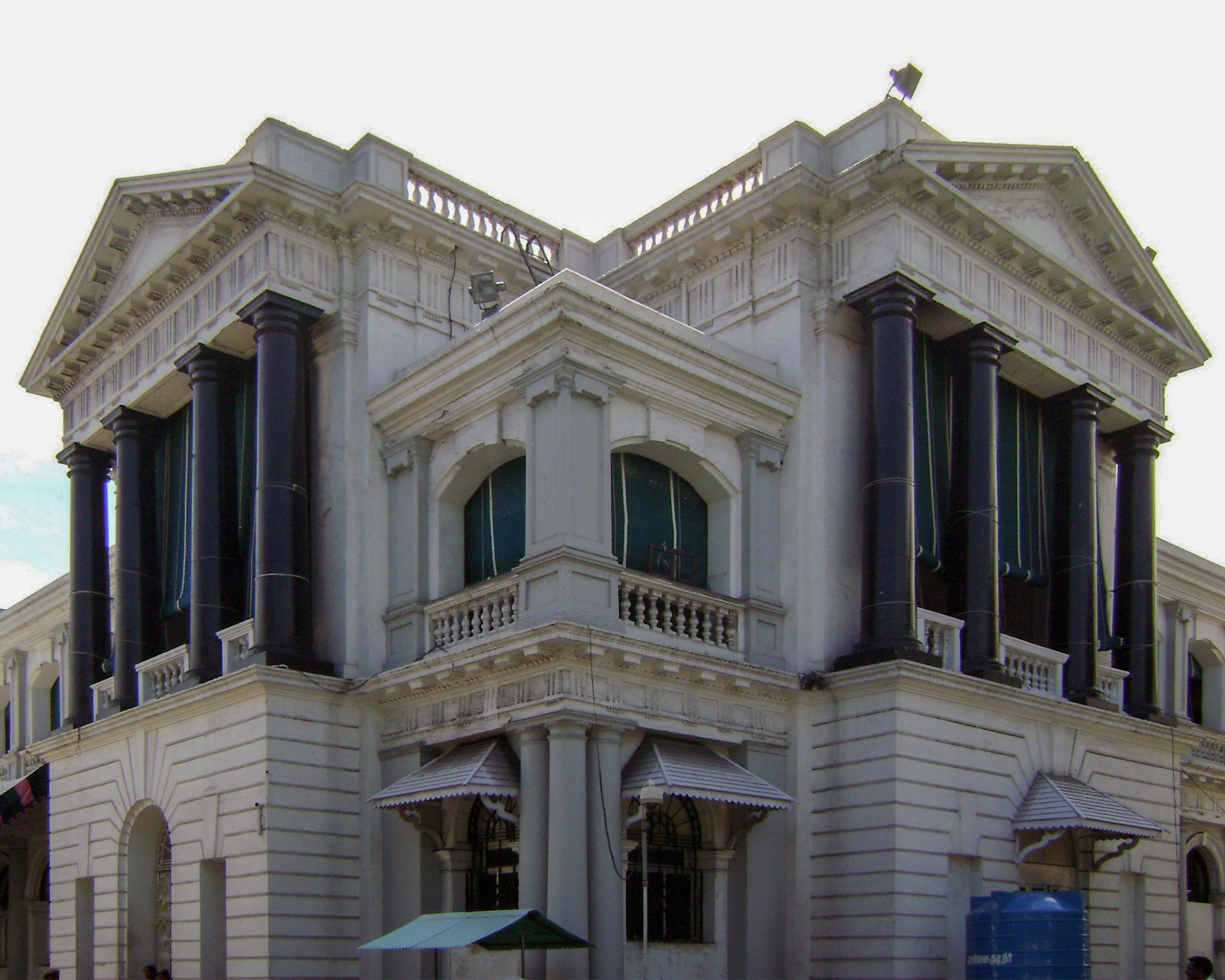
- Fort St. George, the seat of Government of Tamil Nadu

Site information
- Type: Forts
- Owner: Indian Army
- Controlled by: Ministry of Defence
- Condition: Good

Location
- Location within Chennai
- Coordinates: 13.079722°N 80.286944°E
- Height: 45 m (148 ft)

Site history
- Built: 1639; 387 years ago
- Built by: British East India Company
- In use: Government of Tamil Nadu

Garrison information
- Occupants: Tamil Nadu Legislative Assembly–Secretariat

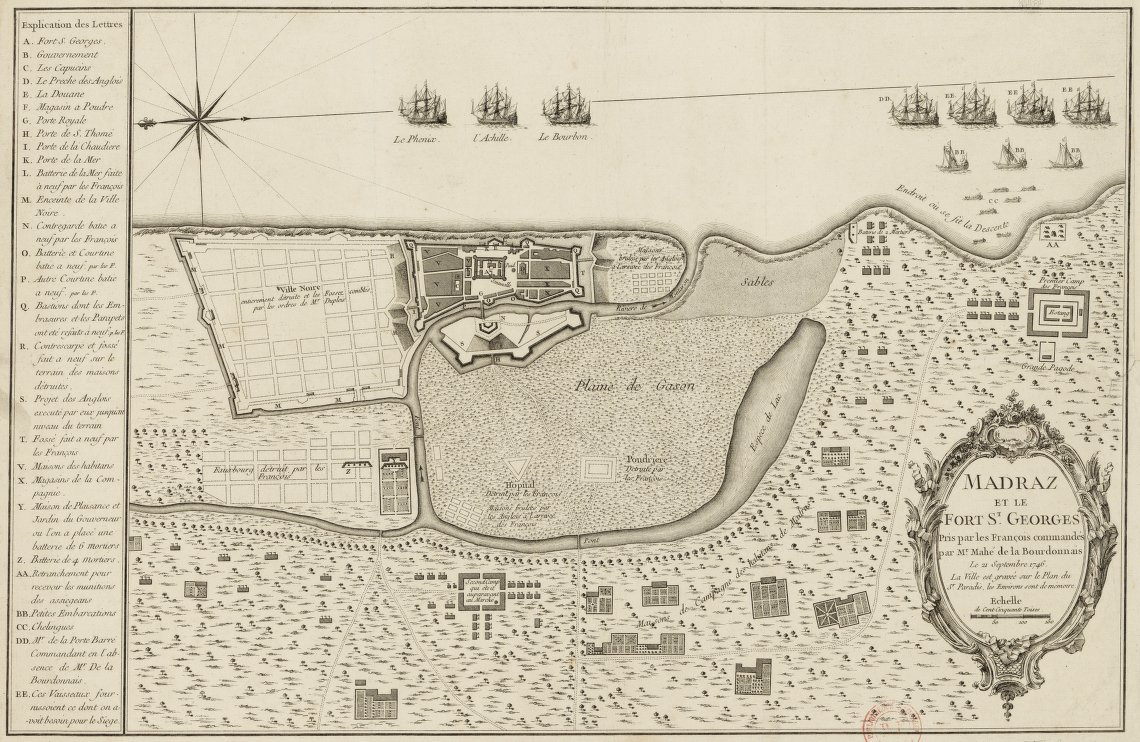
Plan of Fort St. George made during the French occupation of 1746–1749, with East at the top

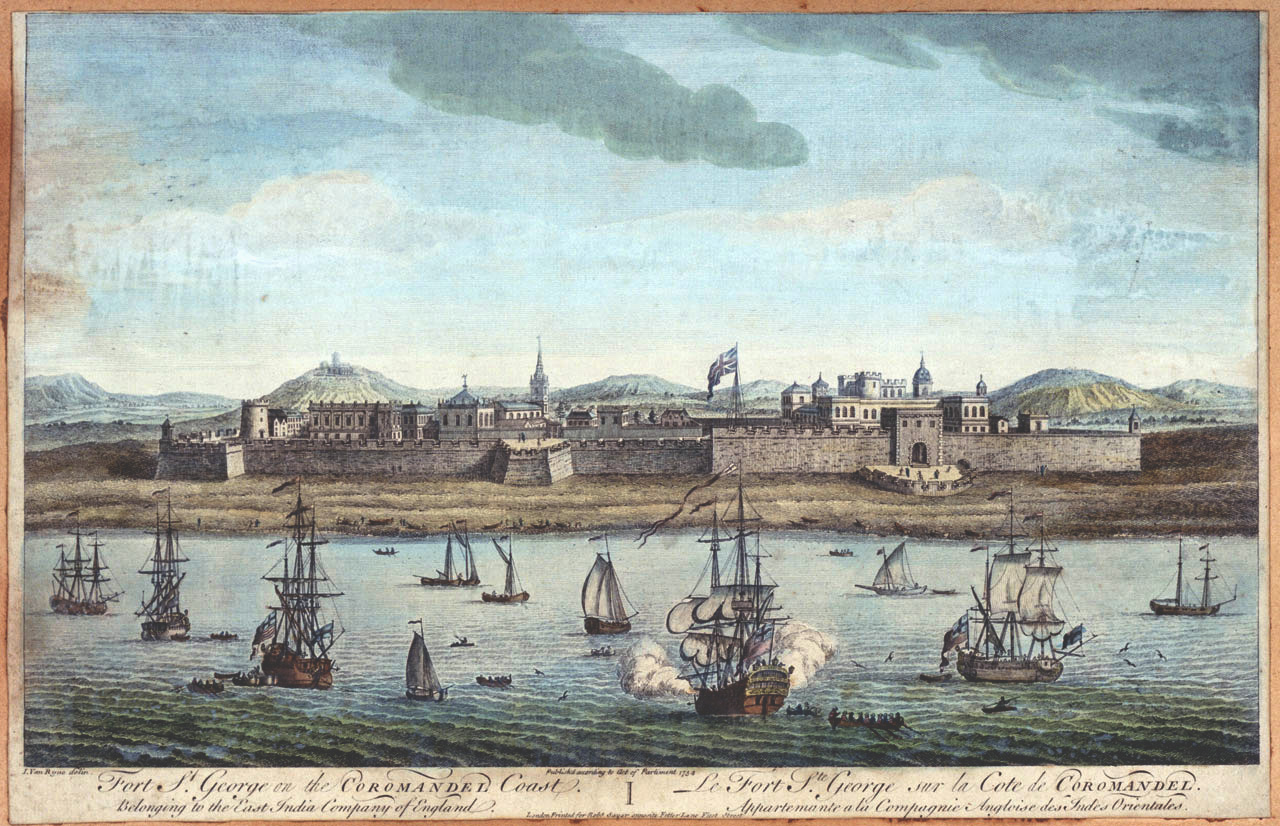
An 18th-century coloured engraving of the fort

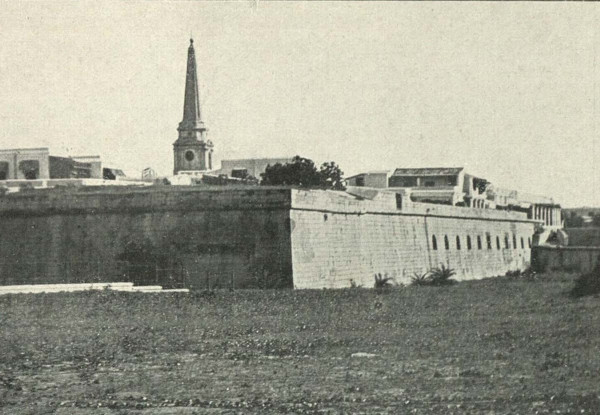
Corner of Fort St. George showing the spire of St Mary's Church, where in 1753 Robert Clive married Margaret Maskelyne, the younger sister of the Astronomer Royal, Nevil Maskelyne. Photo c. 1905.

Fort St. George (or historically, White Town) is a fortress at the coastal city of Chennai, India. Founded in 1639, it was the first English (later British) fortress in India. The construction of the fort provided the impetus for further settlements and trading activity, in what was originally an uninhabited land. Thus, it is a feasible contention to say that the city (named Madras since before the arrival of the Europeans until July 1996) evolved around the fortress. The fort currently houses the Tamil Nadu legislative assembly and other official buildings.

== History ==
The East India Company (EIC), which had entered India around 1600 for trading activities, had begun licensed trading at Surat, which was its initial bastion. However, to secure its trade lines and commercial interests in the spice trade, it felt the necessity of a port closer to the Malaccan Straits. Thanks to negotiations led by Francis Day with ruler of Chandragiri in 1639, English succeeded in purchasing a piece of coastal land, originally called Chennirayarpattinam or Channapatnam, where the company began the construction of a harbour and a fort.

The fort was completed on 23 April 1644, at a cost of £3,000, coinciding with St. George's Day, celebrated in honour of the patron saint of England. The fort, hence christened Fort St. George, faced the sea and some fishing villages, and it soon became the hub of merchant activity. It gave birth to a new settlement area called George Town (historically referred to as Black Town), which grew to envelop the villages and led to the formation of the city of Madras. It also helped to establish English influence over the Carnatic region, and to keep the kings of Arcot and Srirangapatna, as well as the French forces based at Pondicherry, at bay. In 1665, after the EIC received word of the formation of the new French East India Company, the fort was strengthened and enlarged while its garrison was increased.

According to the 17th-century merchant and traveller Thomas Bowrey, Fort St. George was:

without all dispute a beneficial place to the Honourable English India Company, and with all the Residence of theire Honourable Agent and Governour all of their Affaires Upon this Coast and the Coast of Gingalee, the Kingdoms also of Orixa, (Orissa) Bengala (Bengal), and Pattana (Patna), the said Governour and his Councell here resideigne, for the Honour of our English Nation keepinge and maintainneinge the place in great Splendour, Civil and good Government, Entertaineinge nobly all Foraign Embassadors, and provideinge great quantities of Muzlinge (Muslin) Callicoes (Calico) &c. to be yearly transported to England.

The Fort is a stronghold with 6-metre-high (20 ft) walls that withstood a number of assaults in the 18th century. It briefly passed into the possession of the French from 1746 to 1749, but was restored to Great Britain under the Treaty of Aix-la-Chapelle, which ended the War of the Austrian Succession.

The Fort now serves as one of the administrative headquarters for the legislative assembly of Tamil Nadu state and it still houses a garrison of troops in transit to various locations at South India and the Andamans. The Fort Museum contains many relics of the Raj era, including portraits of many of the Governors of Madras. The fort is maintained by the Archaeological Survey of India, with the administrative support of the Indian Army.

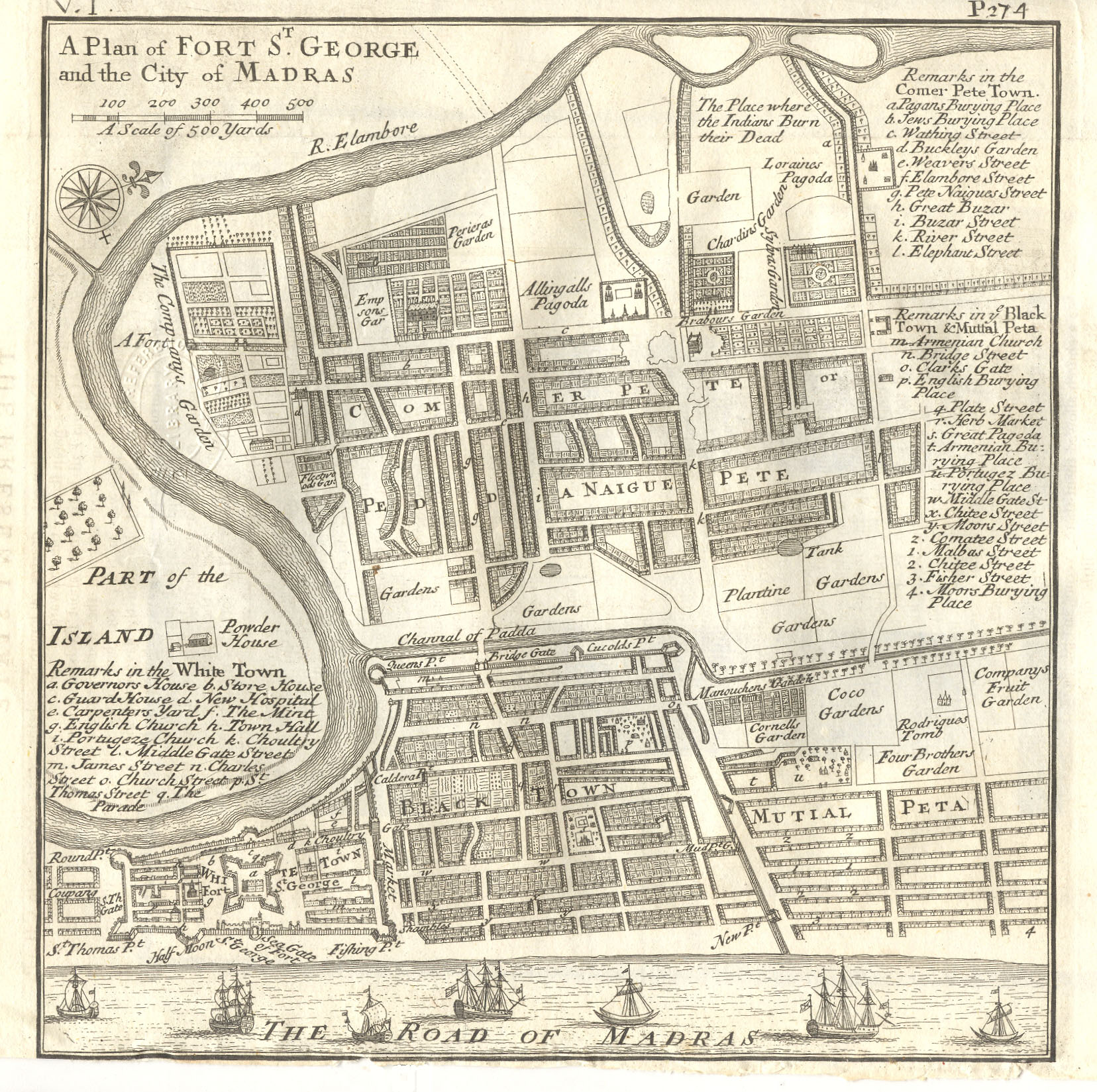
Plan of Fort St George & Madras in 1726

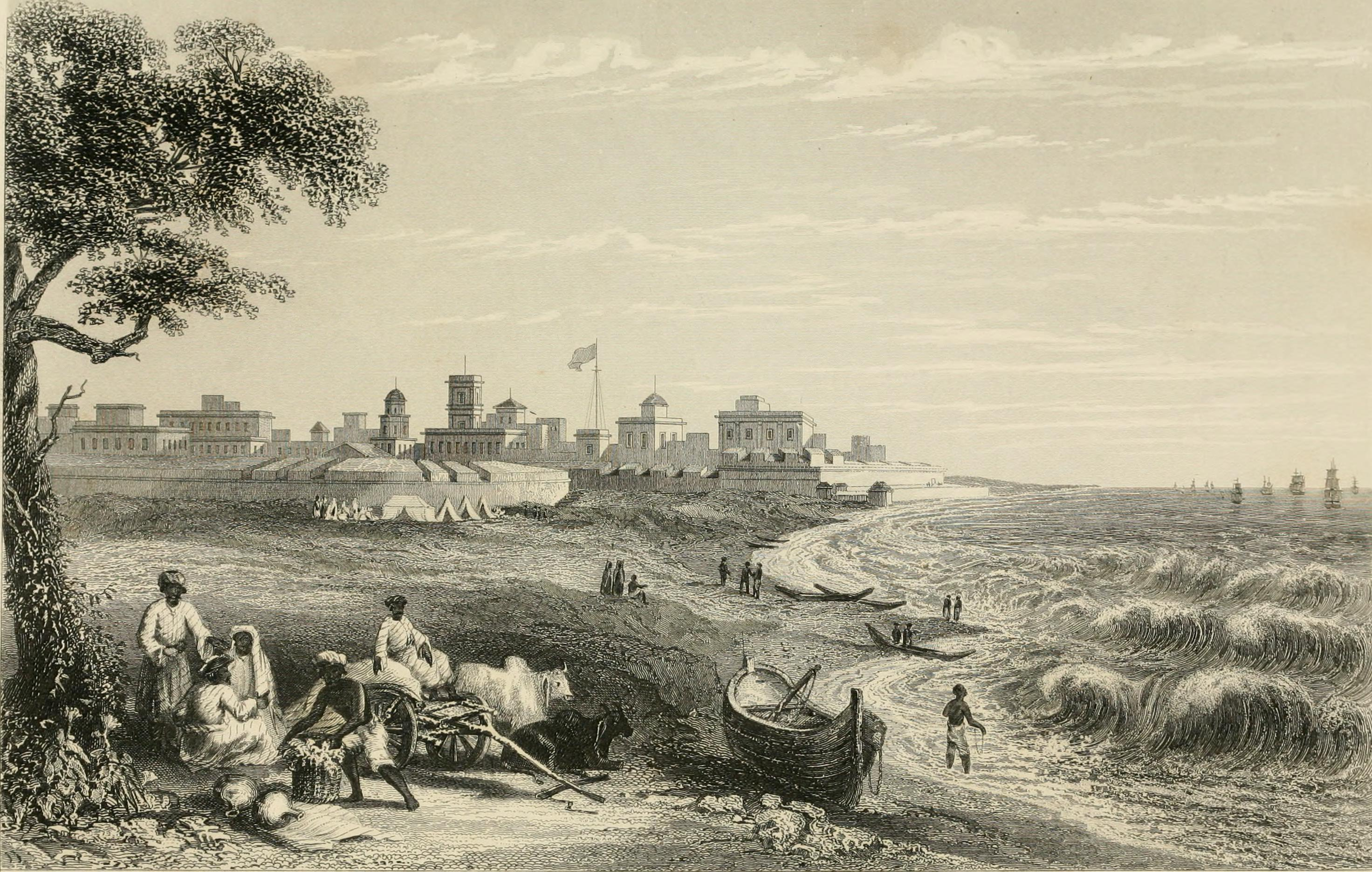
Fort St. George in 1858

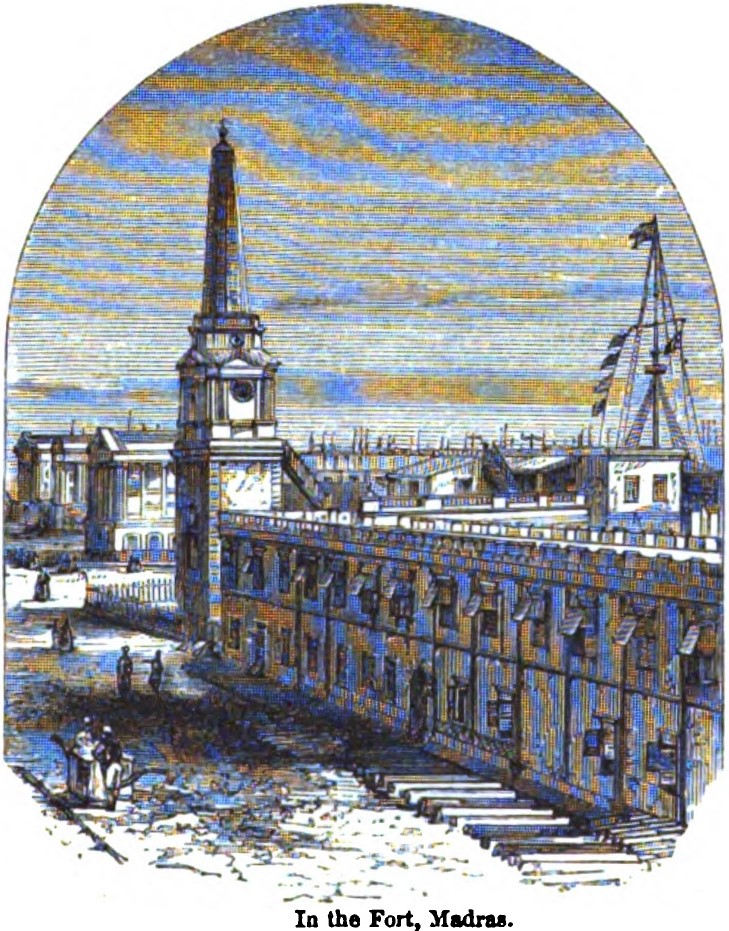
In the Fort, Madras (MacLeod, p. 124, 1871)

=== The church ===
St. Mary's Church is the oldest Anglican church in India. It was built between 1678 and 1680 on the orders of the then Agent of Madras Streynsham Master. The tombstones in its graveyard are the oldest English or British tombstones in India. This ancient prayer house solemnised the marriages of Robert Clive and Governor Elihu Yale, who later became the first benefactor of Yale University in the United States.

=== Museum ===
The Fort Museum, which is the only ticketed institution of the Archaeological Survey of India in the complex, exhibits many items of the period of English and later British rule. This building was completed in 1795 and first housed the office of the Madras Bank. The hall upstairs was the Public Exchange Hall and served as a place for public meetings, lottery draws and occasional entertainment. These relics are reminders of British rule in India. The objects on display in the museum are the weapons, coins, medals, uniforms and other artefacts from England, Scotland, France and India dating back to the colonial period. Original letters written by Clive and Cornwallis make fascinating reading. One set of quaint period uniforms is displayed for viewing, as well. However, the pièce de resistance is a large statue of Lord Cornwallis.

The National Flag of India was designed by Pingali Venkayya and adopted in its present form during the meeting of the Constituent Assembly held on 22 July 1947, a few days before India's independence from Britain on 15 August 1947. The first ever flag flown after the independence is stored in the third floor of the museum. The public are allowed to see but not to touch or take photographs.

The museum is mentioned in the novel The Museum of Innocence, by the Turkish Nobel Laureate Orhan Pamuk.

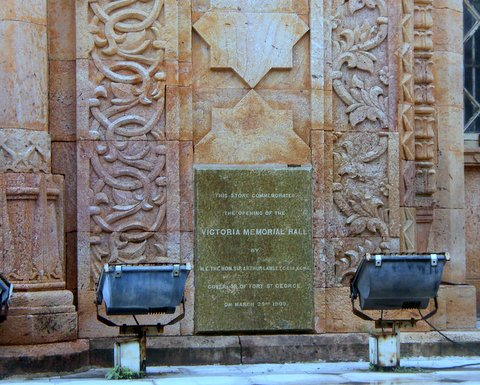
Victoria Memorial Hall

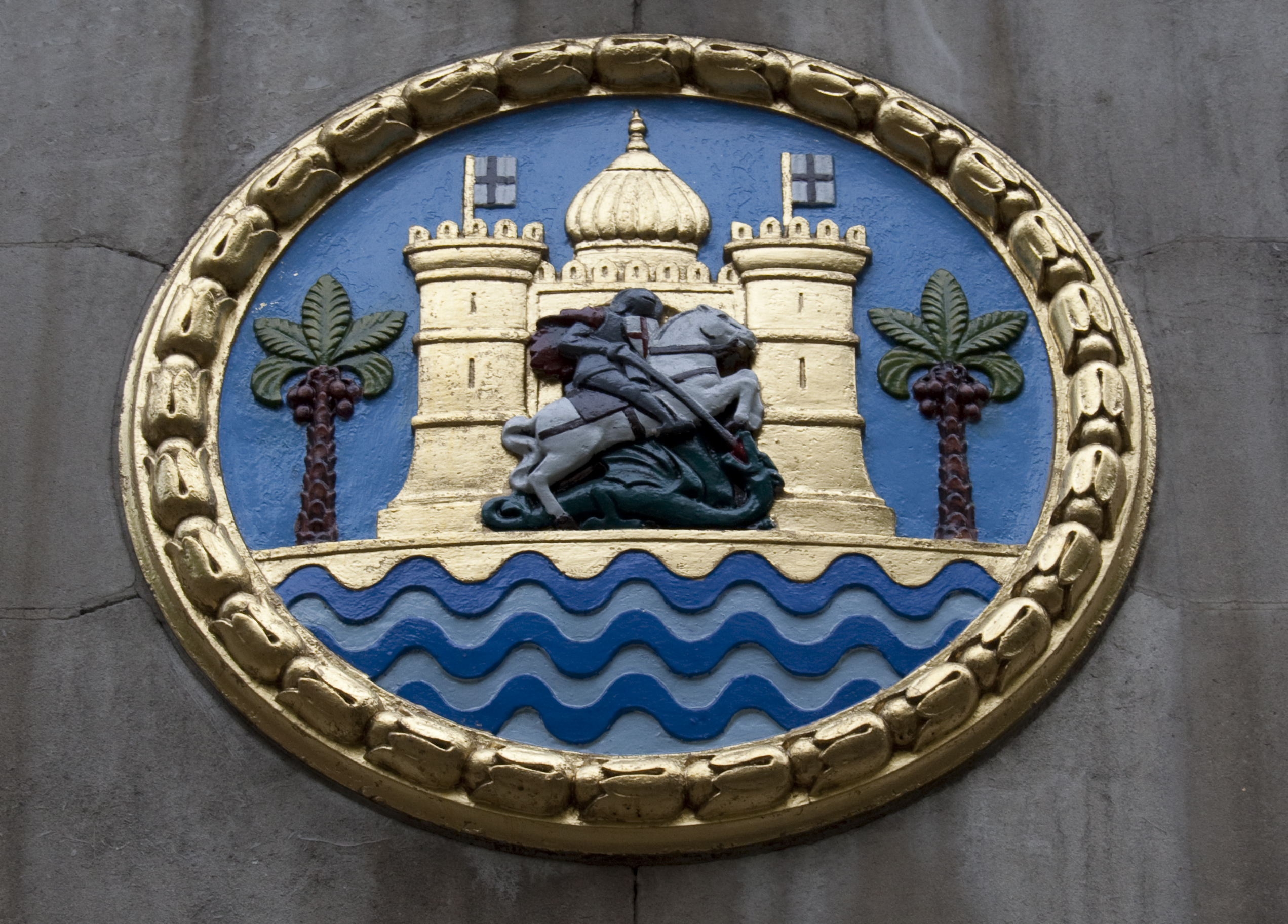
Coat of Arms of Madras Presidency depicting Fort St. George

=== Wellesley House ===
The first floor of the building includes the Banqueting Hall, which holds paintings of the Governor of the Fort and other high officials of the administration. The cannons of Tipu Sultan decorate the ramparts of the museum. The 4.4-metre (14.5 ft) statue stands at the entrance near a stairway in the museum. This statue was created by Charles Bank in England to be brought to India. The pedestal of the statue is carved with a scene depicting Tipu Sultan's emissary. The house takes its name from Richard Wellesley, Governor General of India, and brother of the Duke of Wellington.

=== Flagstaff ===
The flagstaff at the fort is one of the tallest in the country. Made of teakwood, it is 46 metres (150 ft) high.

== Namakkal Kavignar Maligai ==
Namakkal Kavingar Maligai is a 10-storeyed building at the campus and is the power centre of state secretariat. It houses offices of the secretaries and departments. Between 2012 and 2014, the building was renovated at a cost of ₹280 million (equivalent to ₹490 million or US$5.1 million in 2026), with additional facilities like centralised air-conditioning and new electrical wiring system.

=== In recent years ===
The entire complex is administered by the Department of Defence. The fort building is a three-storeyed one housing the offices of the chief minister and other ministers, the chief secretary, home ministry, treasury, etc. The remaining offices are housed in the 10-storeyed Namakkal Kavingyar Maaligai, which houses more than 30 departments.

The Fort St. George complex housed the administrative buildings of the Government of Tamil Nadu till March 2010. The Legislature of Tamil Nadu and the secretariat (with headquarters of various government departments) were situated in the fort. The fort itself was open to the public however only to a certain area. The main building or the secretariat was open only to government officials and the police. The cannons and the moat which guarded this old building have been left untouched. In 2010 the legislature and the secretariat moved to a new location and the old assembly complex was converted into a library for the Central Institute of Classical Tamil. Following the 2011 assembly elections and the return of J Jayalalithaa as the Chief Minister of the State, the Tamil Nadu Assembly and the Secretariat have been restored to Fort St. George.

== Other monuments ==
An arch commemorating the diamond jubilee of Tamil Nadu Legislative Assembly is under construction near the Fort on Rajaji Salai close to Napier Bridge. The structure is a replica of Fort St. George's façade. The arch will be rectangular in structure with a height of 12 m (41 ft) and a width of 80 m (260 ft) being built at a cost of ₹13.3 million (US$140,000). The structure will be a mix of old and modern architecture, inspired by the frontage of Fort St. George. The legend 'Tamil Nadu Legislative Assembly diamond jubilee commemorative arch' would be inscribed in English and Tamil, in addition to the words '60 years'. The chief minister J Jayalalithaa laid the foundation stone for the arch on 30 October 2012. Earlier, the arch was planned to be constructed close to the entrance of Fort St. George, but was later relocated beyond the prohibitive zone, as per AMASR Act. A public interest litigation (PIL) was filed in the Madras High Court opposing the move stating that the arch would choke Rajaji Salai that leads to the High Court. However, the petition was dismissed by a division bench on 9 January 2013.

== See also ==
- Heritage structures in Chennai
- History of Chennai
- List of Tamil Nadu Government Estates, Complexes, Buildings and Structures
- Tamil Nadu legislative assembly-secretariat complex
- Timeline of Chennai history (Section: 17th century)
- Fort William, India
