= Tamil Nadu Police Museum, Chennai =

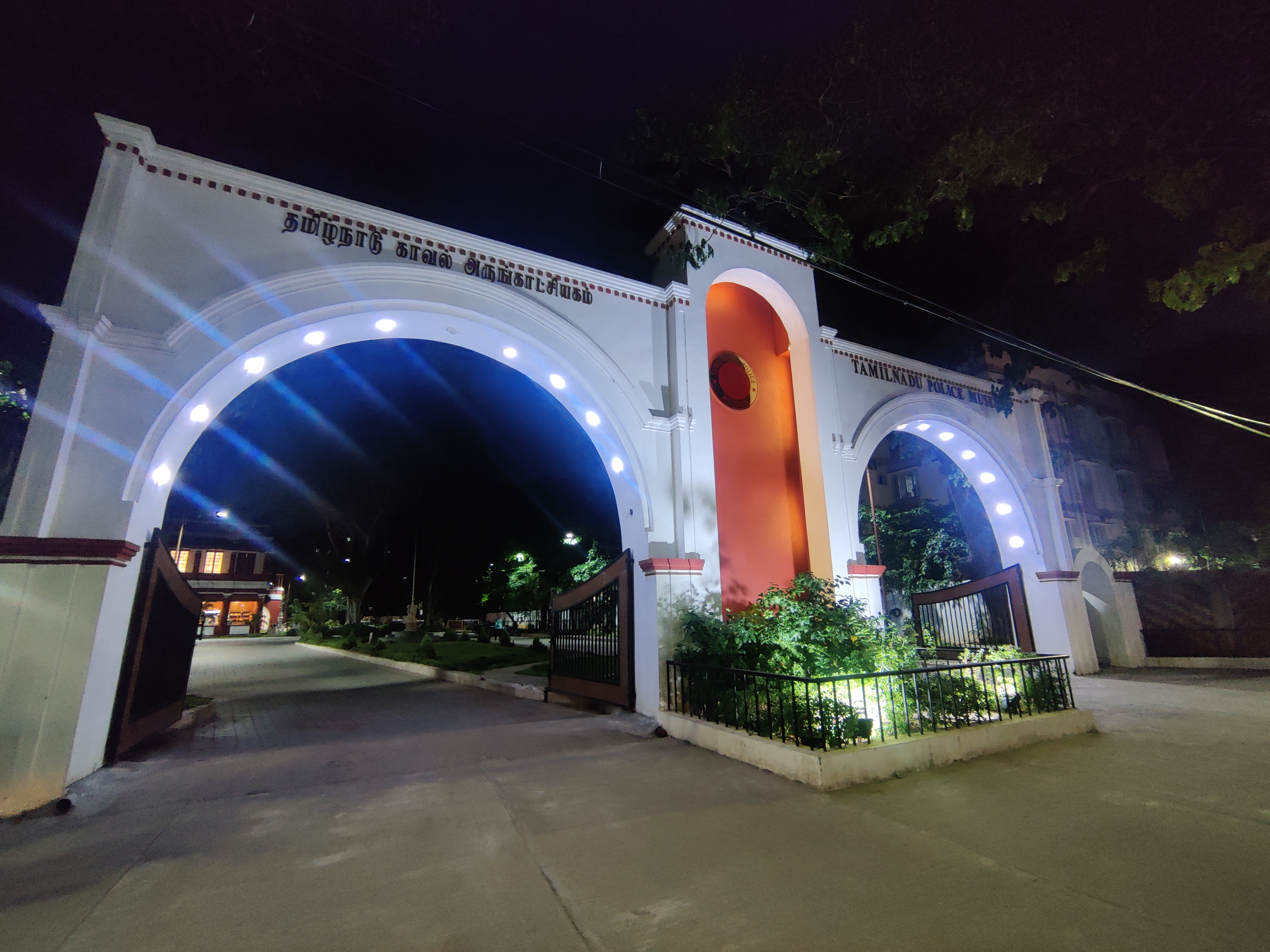
- Entrance arch of the TN Police museum

- Location within Chennai
- Established: 2021; 5 years ago
- Location: 483 Pantheon Road, Egmore, Chennai, Tamil Nadu, India
- Coordinates: 13.0741228°N 80.2626140°E
- Type: History museum
- Curator: Tmt.S.Dhanalakshmi
- Owner: Tamil Nadu Police
- Public transit access: Chennai Egmore (Suburban), Egmore metro station
- Website: tnpolicemuseumchennai.com

Tamil Nadu Police Museum is a museum in Chennai, India. Located in Pantheon Road in the neighbourhood of Egmore, the museum was opened in September 2021. The museum has a repository of exhibits marking the passage of the state's law enforcement agency from British Raj to the modern day.

== History ==
The building was constructed in 1842 and originally owned by Arunagiri Mudaliar. In 1856, the structure and its outlying grounds covering a total of 14 acres were brought for ₹ 21,000 and was converted into the headquarters of the first Police Commissioner of Madras, Lieutenant-Colonel John Carne Boulderson. The building remained the Madras Commissioner's office until 2013. The building was initially about to be demolished. However, the Tamil Nadu Police Housing Corporation, Reach Foundation and Conservation Mainstream later considered the adaptive reuse of the building. Restoration works began in October 2020 and completed in 9 months. The heritage structure was converted into a museum in September 2021 at a cost of ₹ 64.7 million.

== The museum ==
The museum is a two-storied Indo-Saracenic structure, consisting of high parapet walls, wooden spiral stairway, Madras terrace roofing, and traditional lime-plastered walls. The grand portico at the entrance features Doric columns. The interiors feature massive louvred doors that open in from the deep verandah running around the building. The first high-ceiling hall of the building features wooden beams. A red baize-lined wooden staircase leads to the upper storey.

The first curator of the museum is Steve Borgia and the present government-appointed curator is D. Bharath Raj, followed by M.Kodhandan. The Newly appointed Curator by the present government is Tmt.S.Dhanalakshmi

== Exhibits ==
Almost 200-year-old artifacts are exhibited in the museum. All of the artifacts were collected from various police stations and none of them was purchased. Exhibits at the museum includes a blue Plymouth Belvedere, once the car that Police Commissioners and Chiefs travelled to work in, parked at the portico; a parade of vehicles that were used as a means of transport by the beat constable (penny-farthing bicycle), the despatcher (Royal Enfield bike), and coastal security personnel (motorised speedboat); landmark cases dealt by the city's police department displayed in the first hall (including the 1965 anti-Hindi agitation, the 1975 LIC building fire, and images depicting the 1982 event of the LTTE chief V. Prabakaran and PLOTE leader Uma Maheswaran shooting at each other in Pondy Bazaar); a wall panel depicting the Auto Shankar case; a model sub-jail; mannequins displaying Sam Browne belts and sola topees and the uniforms of the various wings; musical instruments of the police bandsman; rare temple sculptures recovered by the department's idol wing; a confidential document copier from the 1900s; primitive wireless sets; 1955 photographs of uniformed men in mitre-shaped caps and shorts in the control room; and a battery of guns ranging from the old faithful 303 to a Bren light-machine, along with Winchester and 12-bore bullets. The museum also displays artifacts seized from sandalwood smuggler Veerappan and LTTE leader Velupillai Prabhakaran. Former Chief Minister J. Jayalalithaa's bullet-proof sports utility vehicle (SUV) is also on display. A time-map charting out the evolution of the law enforcement department beginning from the Sangam era, through the poligars and the Vellore Mutiny, and the establishment of the various departments such as the Chief Office in 1865, the criminal investigation department, women's battalions, the fingerprint and the State crime records bureau. It also includes depictions of the police involvement in flood relief and COVID-19 regulations. Ceremonial swords, cameras that have captured crime scenes, riot gear, explosives, manacles, handcuffs and service medals are also on display.

The far end of the building displays a series of burnished brass bells used by firemen as different alarms.

== See also ==
- Government Museum
- List of Tamil Nadu Government Estates, Complexes, Buildings and Structures
- Heritage structures in Chennai
