= Government Museum, Kalaburagi =

Museum in Karnataka, India

Coordinates: 17.3303°N 76.8416°E

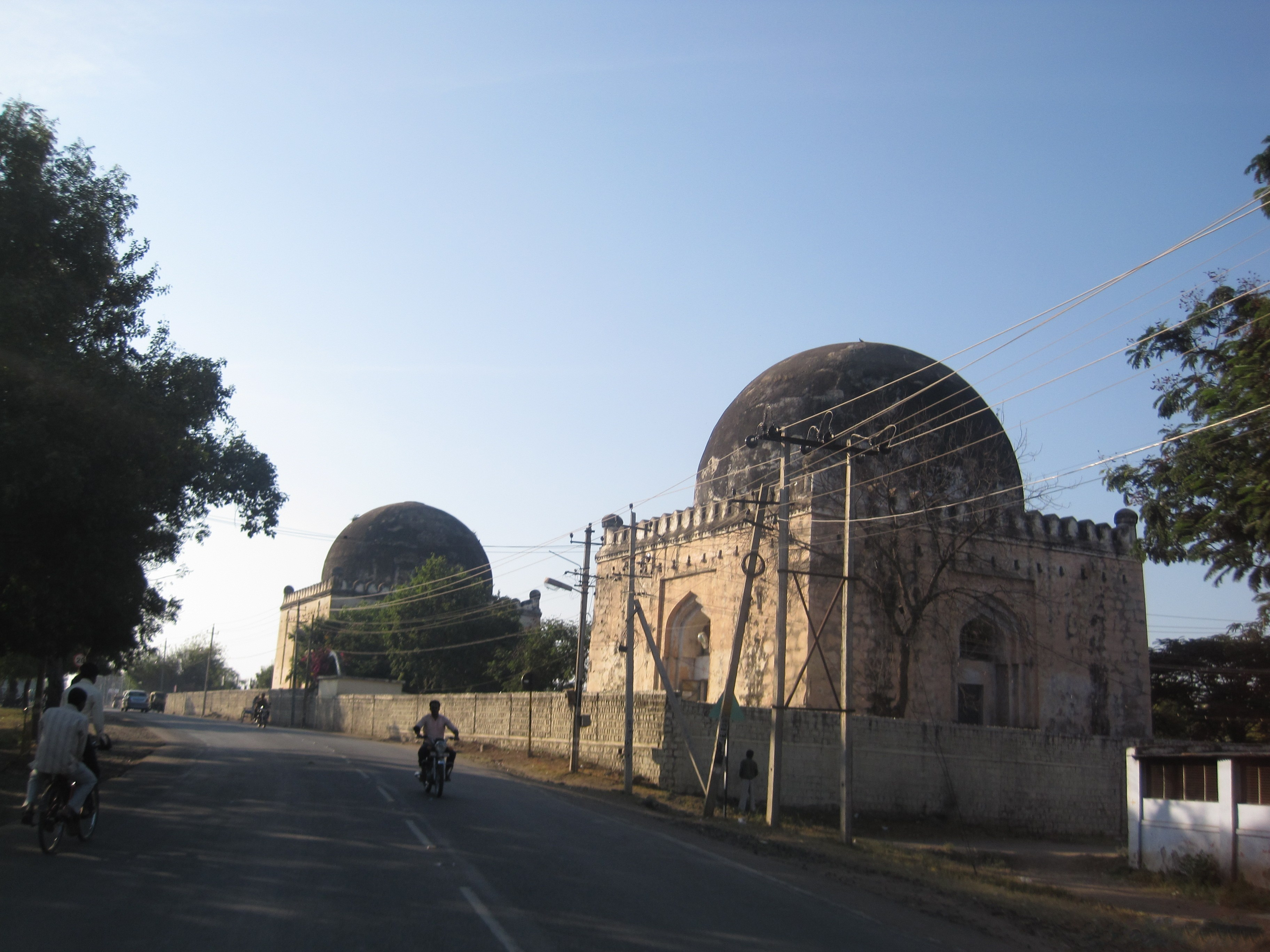
- Two Bahmani tombs house galleries of the museum.
- Established: 1964

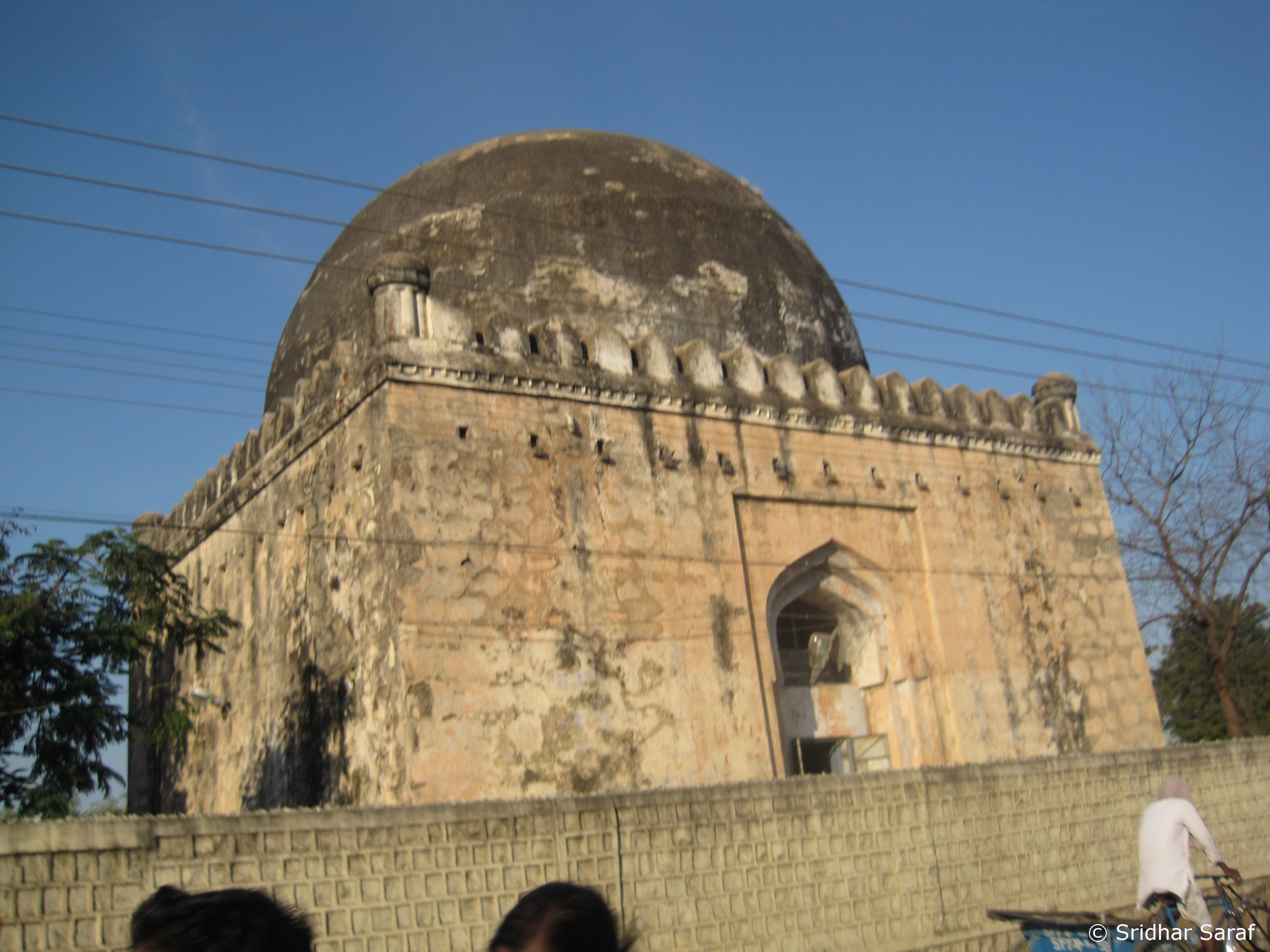
Government Museum, Gulbarga housed in a Bahmani-era tomb

Government Museum, Kalaburagi is a museum in Kalaburagi, in the Indian state of Karnataka. It is run by the state government.

== History ==
The museum was established in 1964, and expanded in 1997 when a third gallery was added.

== Buildings ==
Two of the museum's galleries are housed in tombs dating back to the Bahmani period. A third gallery is situated in a newly constructed building.

== Collections ==
The museum's collections include sculptures excavated from the Sannati stupa. It also includes more than a hundred coins, including coins from the Vijayanagara and Bahmani period.
