= Government Museum, Alwar =

Museum in Rajasthan, India

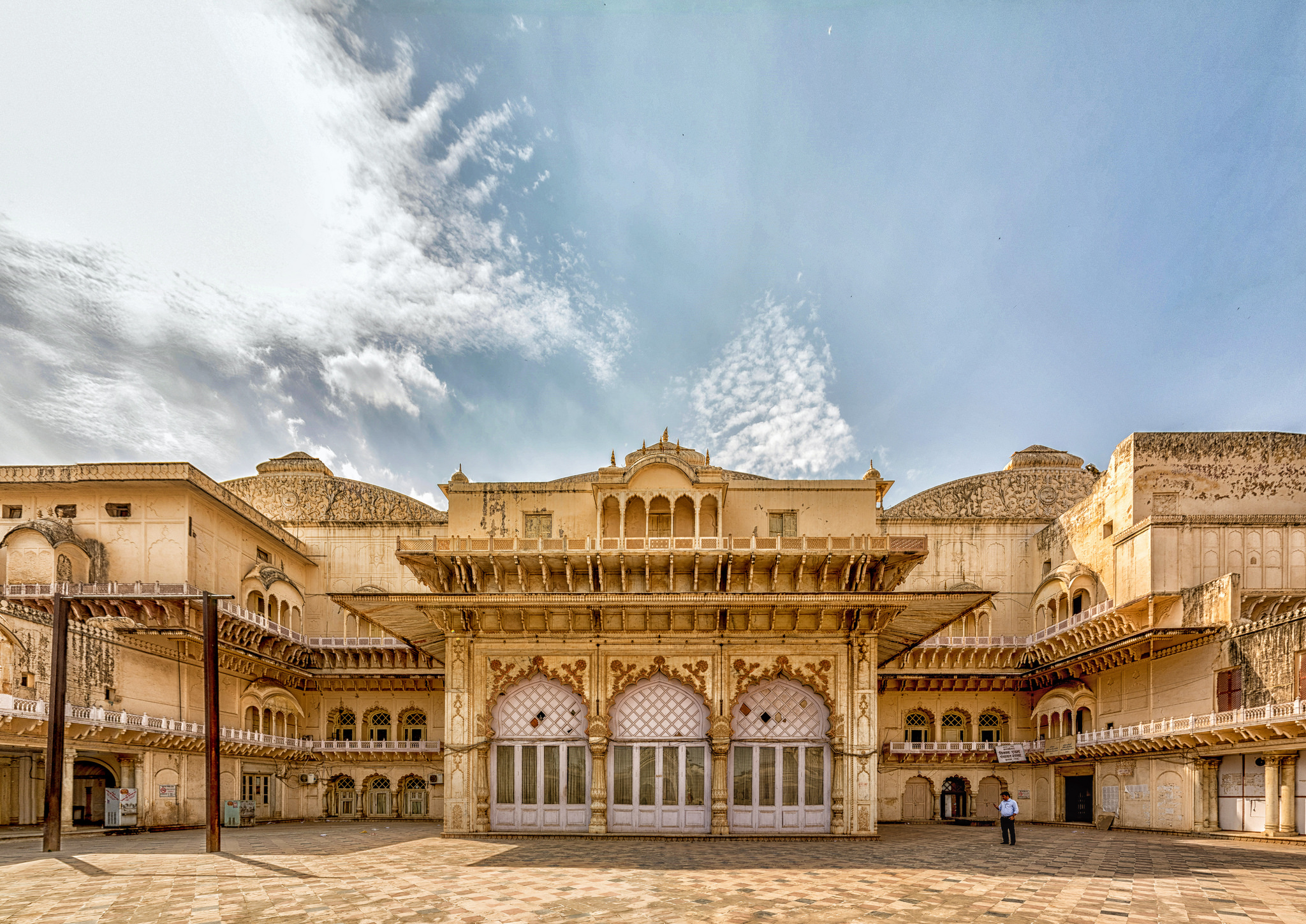
- Established: 1940
- Location: Alwar, Rajasthan, India
- Coordinates: 27.56962°N 76.59369°E
- Type: Art museum

Government Museum, Alwar is a museum located in the Vinay Vilas Mahal of City Palace Alwar in Rajasthan, India. The museum collection captures the cultural, historical, and military past of Rajputana. It emerged from the interest of the royal house of Alwar in collecting specimens of exquisite artistry. The collection was formally opened as a museum in 1940. The building also serves as space for many government offices. This 18th-century palace, built by Maharao Raja Vinay Singh, third ruler of Alwar State, is an amalgamation of Mughal and Rajput architecture. The museum houses a collection that comprises 234 sculptures, 11 inscriptions, 9702 coins, 35 metal objects, 2565 paintings and manuscripts, 2270 armoury items and 1809 miscellaneous objects of local craftsmanship. Looking at the predominance of paintings, manuscripts, and weapons, its curator in the 1960's, P. L. Chakravarti, called it a socio-military museum.

== History ==
The members of Naruka clan were the rulers of Alwar in the princely state era before India became independent. The rulers had a taste for fine and exquisite items. With the decline of Delhi as a center for imperial patronage, many artists and artisans were employed by Alwar court. They brought Mughal aesthetics which explains the significant collection of Mughal paintings in the museum. Not only Delhi artists but the rulers supported and encouraged local art and crafts. They welcomed art dealers from Delhi and built a collection of paintings (18th-19th centuries) as well as rare manuscripts in several languages such as Persian, Urdu, Arabic, and Sanskrit.

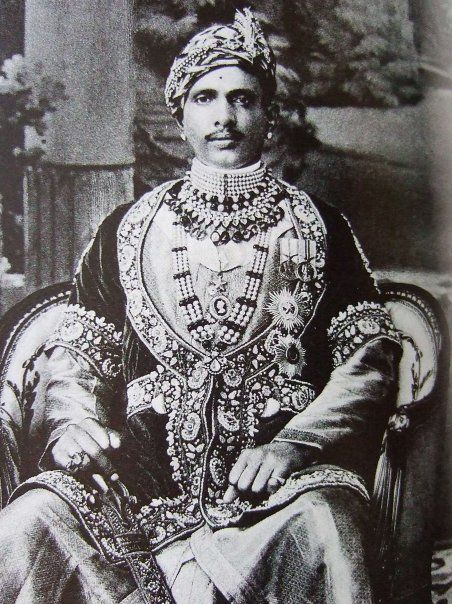
Maharaja Jai Singh of Alwar State

Maharao Raja Sawai Vinay Singh (1815–1857) made Alwar his capital. In the new capital, he established a manuscript library, a painting department, and an armoury. He also acquired the Mughal collections that disbursed from Delhi after the decline of the Mughal dynasty in 19th century and added them to his collection. The objects he gathered were exhibited and shown to important state guests and members of the royal family. Sawai Maharaja Jai Singh (1892–1937), ruler of Alwar, was a patron of art and literature. He was himself an artist. It is said that he would often himself correct the mistakes of the artists. Maharaja Tej Singh (1937–1947) and his prime minister Major Harvey organised the royal collection into a museum within the palace, which was inaugurated in November 1940.

== Collections ==
The rulers of Alwar had collected rare and valuable pieces to preserve as well as to inspire and guide the artists. The collection of the museum has been arranged in three big halls of City Palace, Alwar.

First hall is mainly focused on sculptures and inscriptions. It also exhibits hunting prowess of the royal family in displays of skins of wild animals like lion, tiger, leopard etc. The stuffed birds and animals that had been a royal game have also been displayed. Various specimens of arts and crafts, coins are also included here. Second hall houses the precious collection of Persian, Urdu, Arabic and Sanskrit manuscripts as well as paintings belonging to Mughal and Rajput School of painting. Third section of the museum belongs to the armoury of the rulers of Alwar state. It showcases many types of weapons such as shields, swords, pistols, rifles, and daggers among others.

=== Sculptures and inscriptions ===
The sculptures and inscriptions in the museum collection are important historical sources for the region. The sculptures procured from the ruins of nearby sites like Bhangarh, Neelkanth etc. evidence the high stage of development of plastic art. A dancing statue of Ganesha (1044 CE) depicts the fluidity that the sculptors of the region had achieved. Another 12th century Shiva-Parvati statue is rich in details.

Inscriptions such as those belonging to important historical figures like Bahlol Lodi, Jain inscriptions, and Sati stone inscriptions throw light upon the history and culture of the region. The section also has specimens of various arts and crafts.

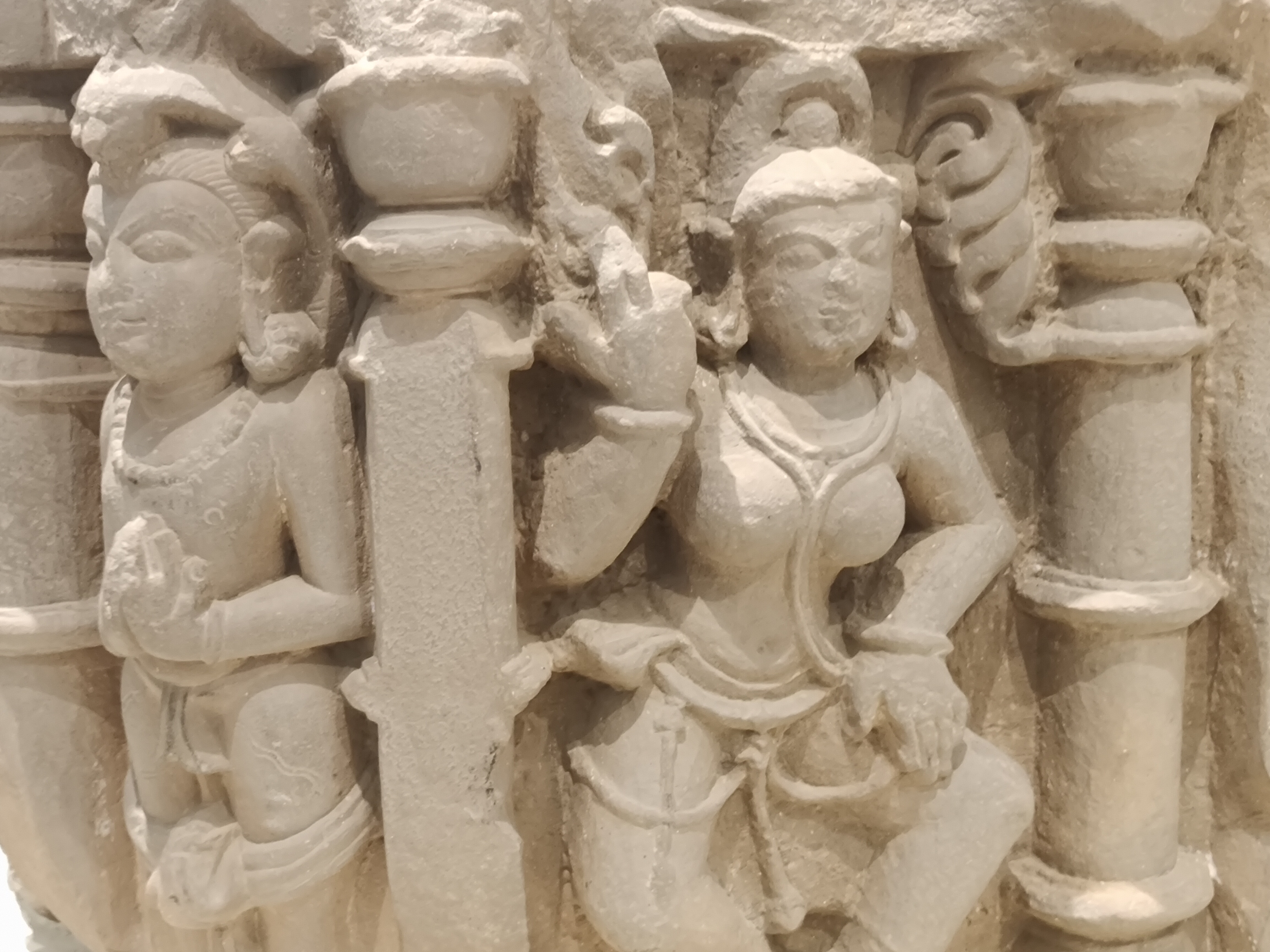
Fragment of a Temple

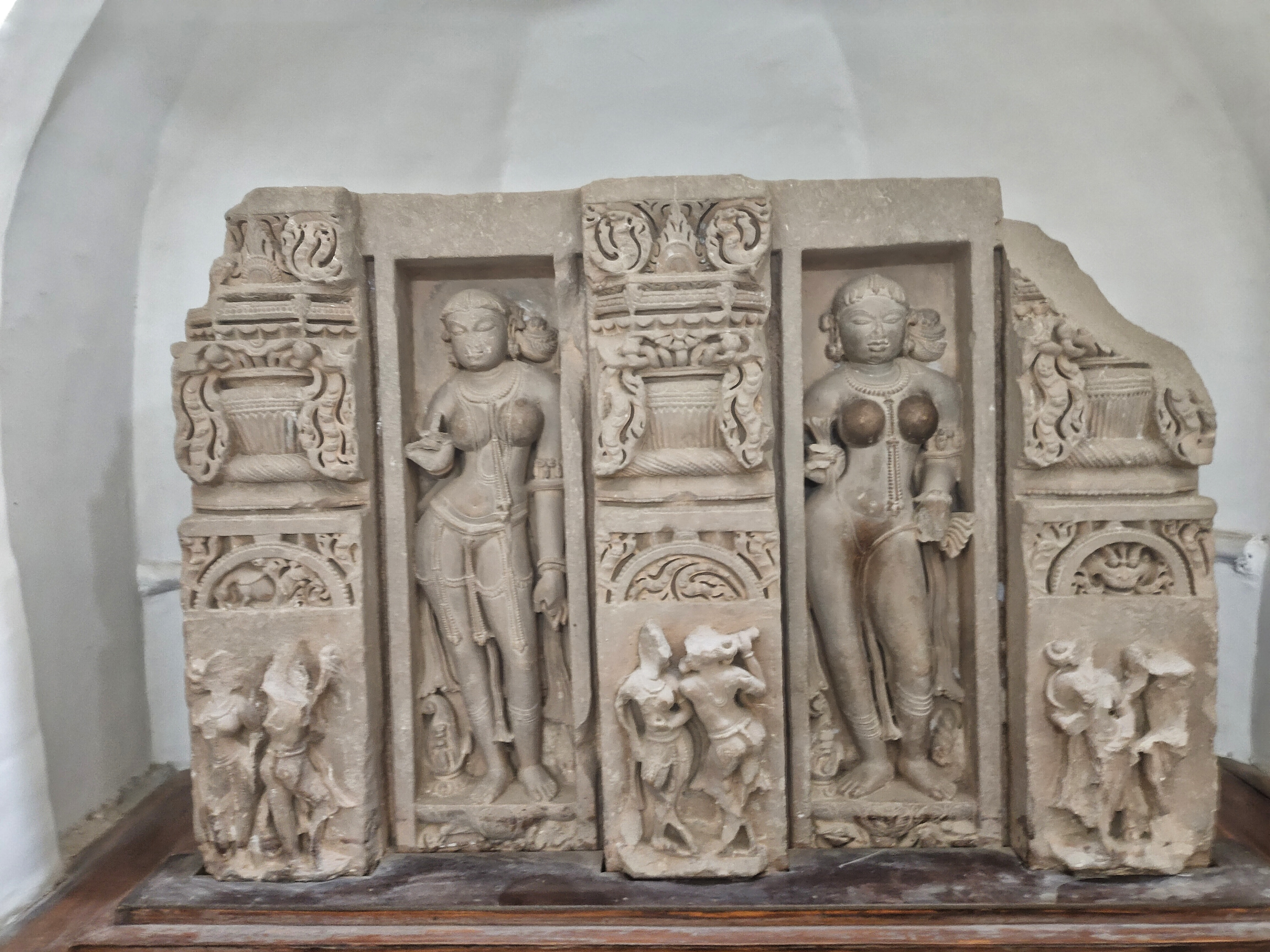
Carved Stone Relief

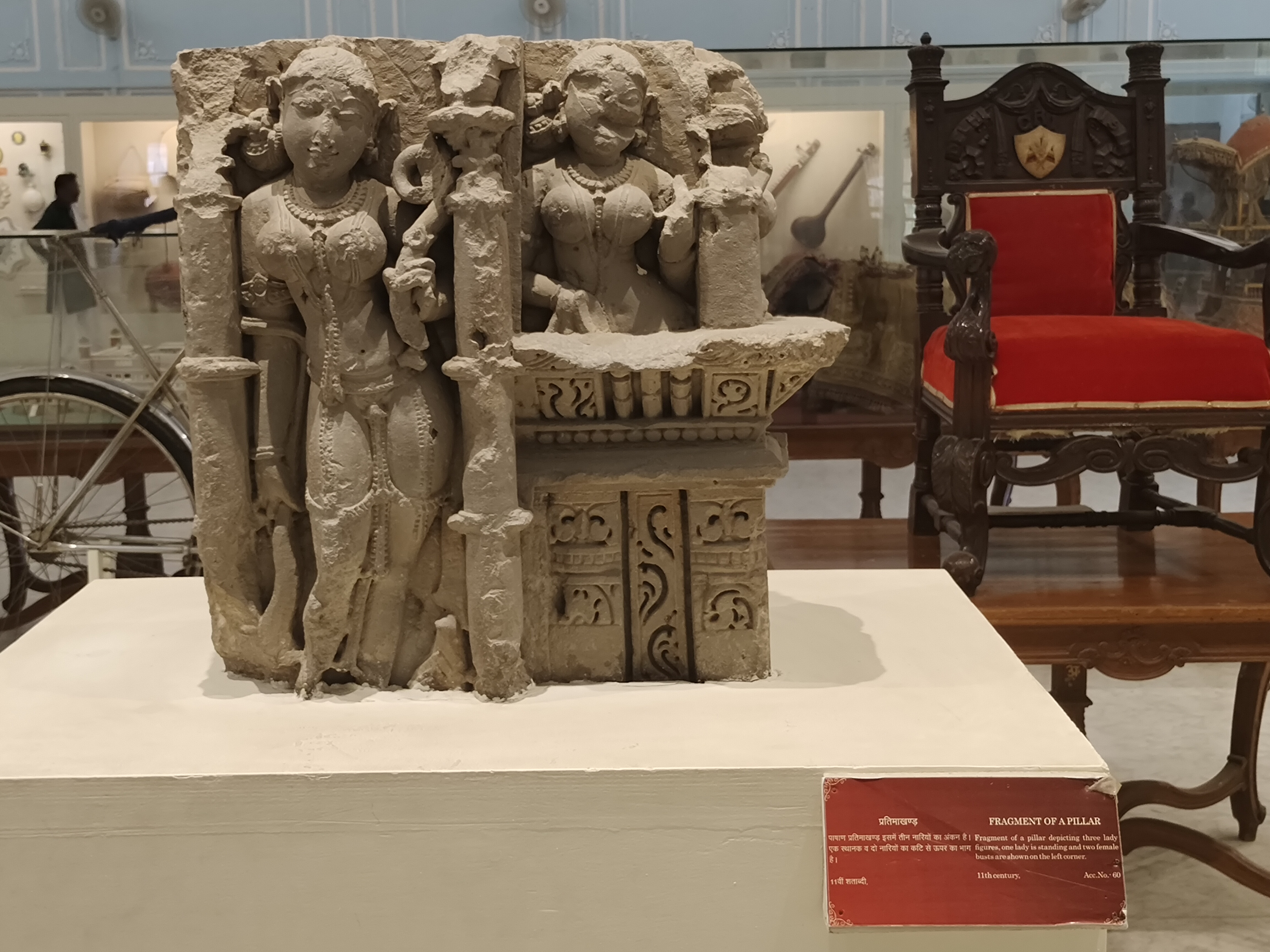
Fragment of a Pillar

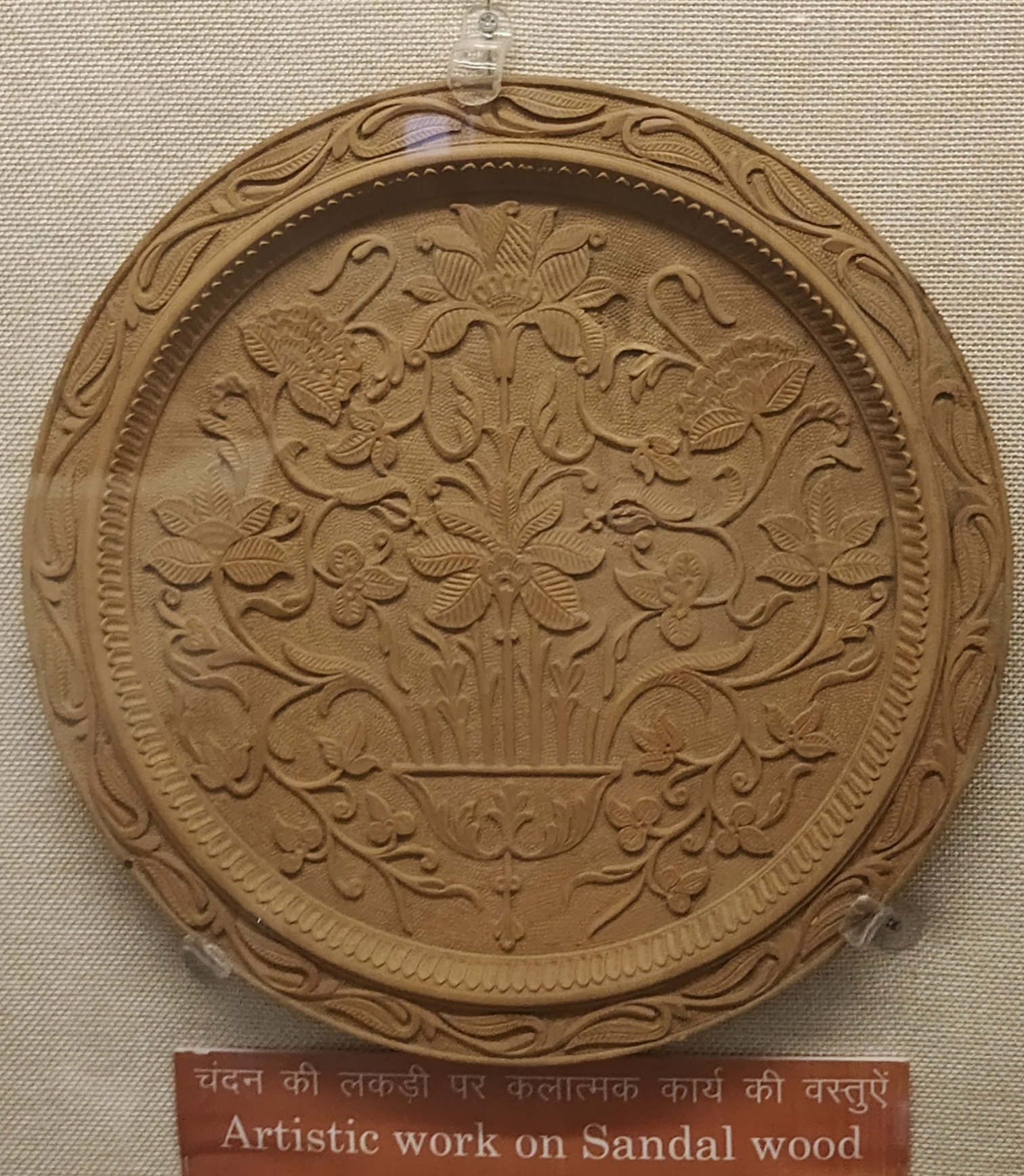
Sandalwood Carving

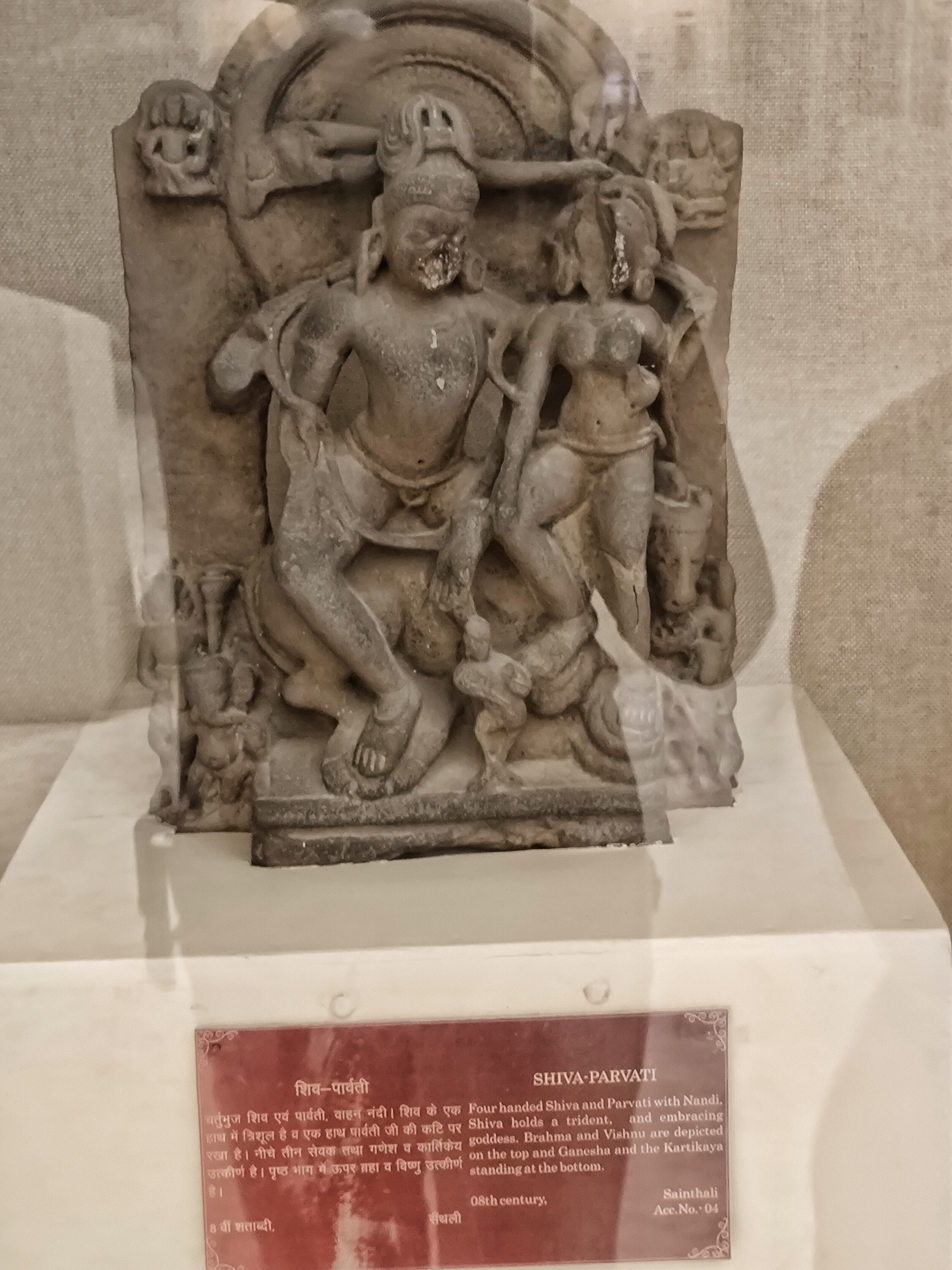
Shiva Parvati

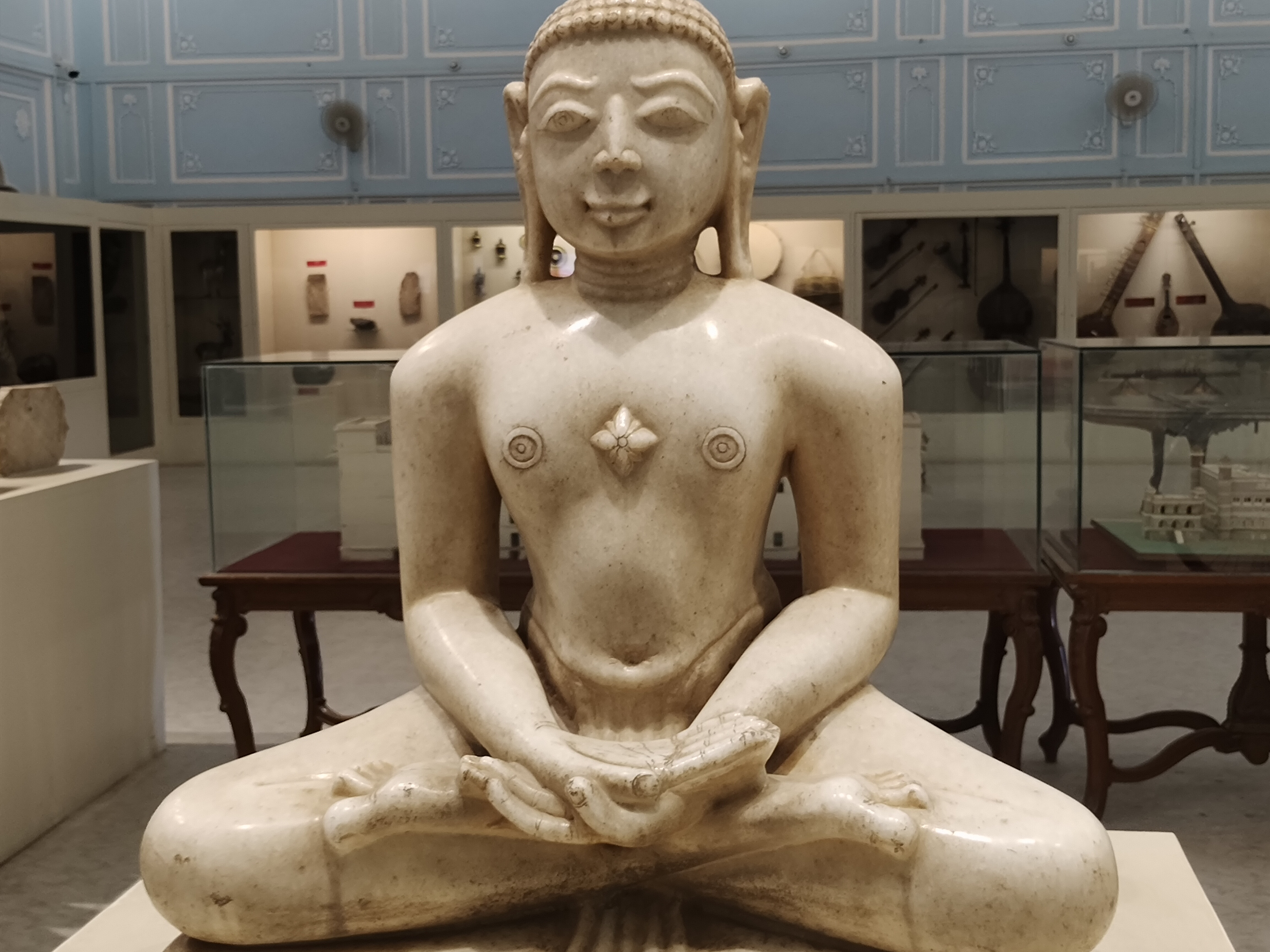
Jain Tirthankar

=== Paintings and manuscripts ===
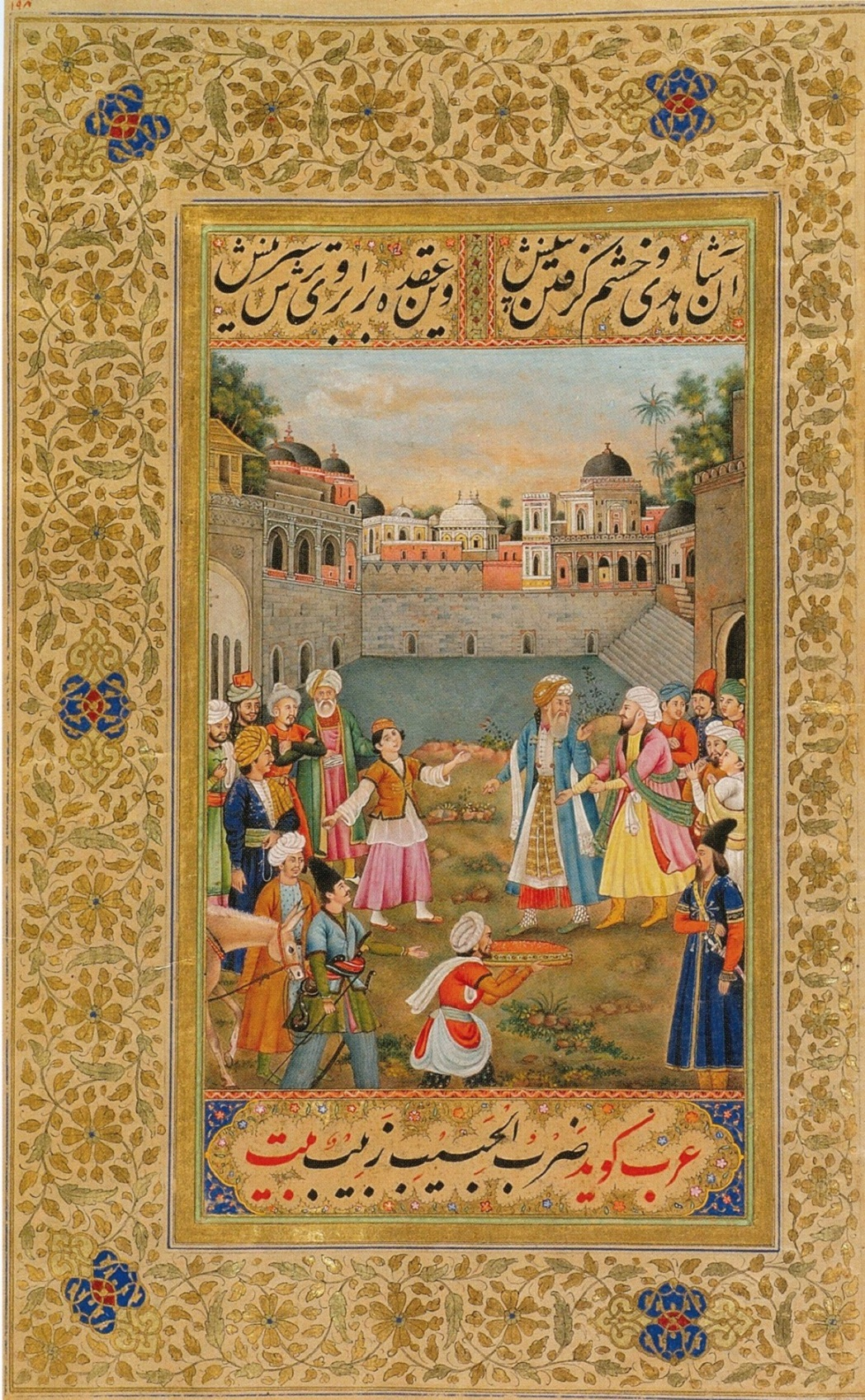
Gulam Ali Khan. A folio from Alwar Gulistan illustrating a story from chapter 5 'Of Love and Youth'. 1840-50, Government Museum, Alwar.

The museum has a rich collection of manuscripts with 4863 Sanskrit manuscripts, 608 Persian manuscripts, 374 Hindi manuscripts, and 73 Urdu manuscripts in its library and exhibits. A manuscript of Baburnama with 18 illustrations of the year 1530, belongs to the reign of Humayun. This is a Persian translation of Turkish original by Bairam Khan. The illustration of Gulistan, Shaikh Sadi's collection of poems, was prepared on the order of Vinay Singh. The pages are highly ornamented, of which 17 are illustrated. The museum also has a number of copies of the Quran, many of them illuminated. Some famous and important paintings in the collection are from the folios of Gulistan of S’adi (the Garden of roses) and Bostan (the Garden of Spring). The museum houses notable and historically significant collection of paintings from illustrated manuscripts that include gems like Waqiat-i-Babri. The museum also has a copy of Mahabharata which has illustrations of Alwar school of painting.

=== Arms and armoury ===
The museum has a huge collection of armoury which is a testimony to the role of Alwar state as a strategic stronghold for both Rajputs and Mughals. It is a famous saying that there can only be one sword in one case, but the museum houses a sheath with two swords in it. There is also a unique weapon called Camel gun which is a small cannon, also known as a swivel gun. It was a specialized form of self-propelled small canon manouvered by a soldier, while the weapon was mounted on a camel. When the canon was fired the camel was made to sit on the knees. It was also known as Shuturnal or Shaheen and manufactured in Machedi in Alwar. Two thousand different types of swords and spears are also a part of the collection. Johardar and Lakhi are famous swords, believed to be unparalleled in India. Sosanpatta, is another famous sword, whose blade is in the shape of an Iris leaf.

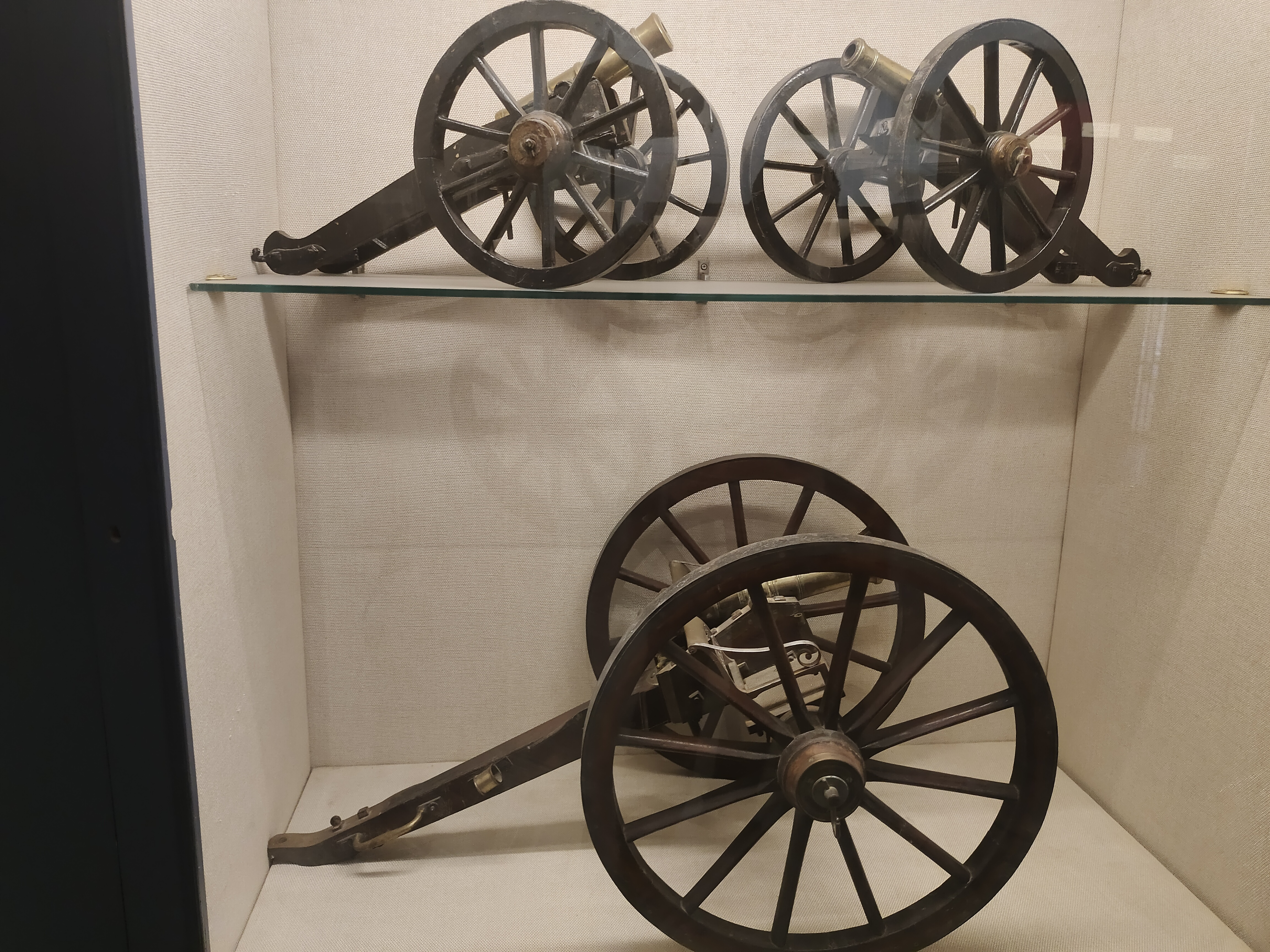
Canons at Alwar Government Museum

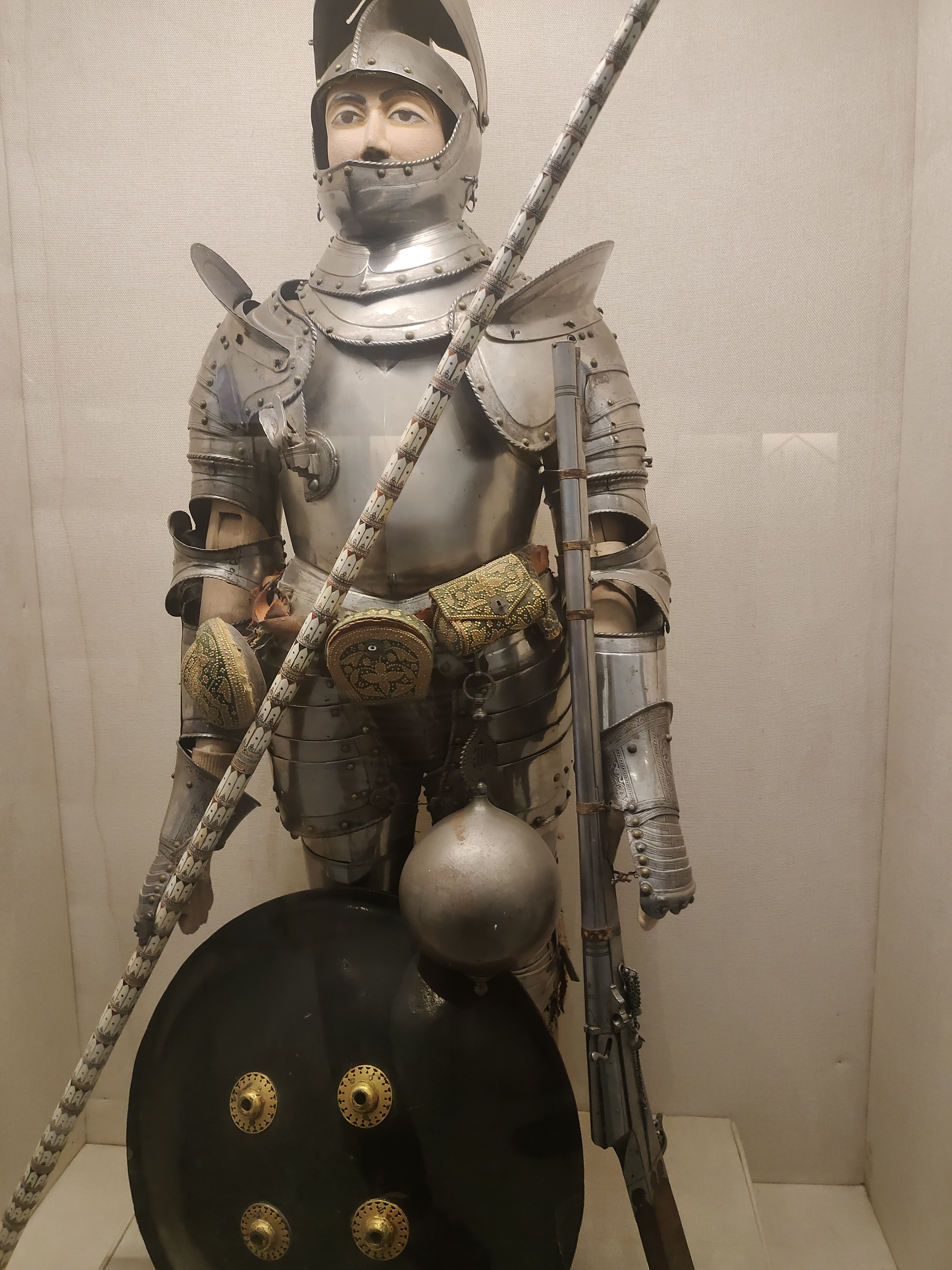
Body armour of Maharaja Yashwantrao Holkar

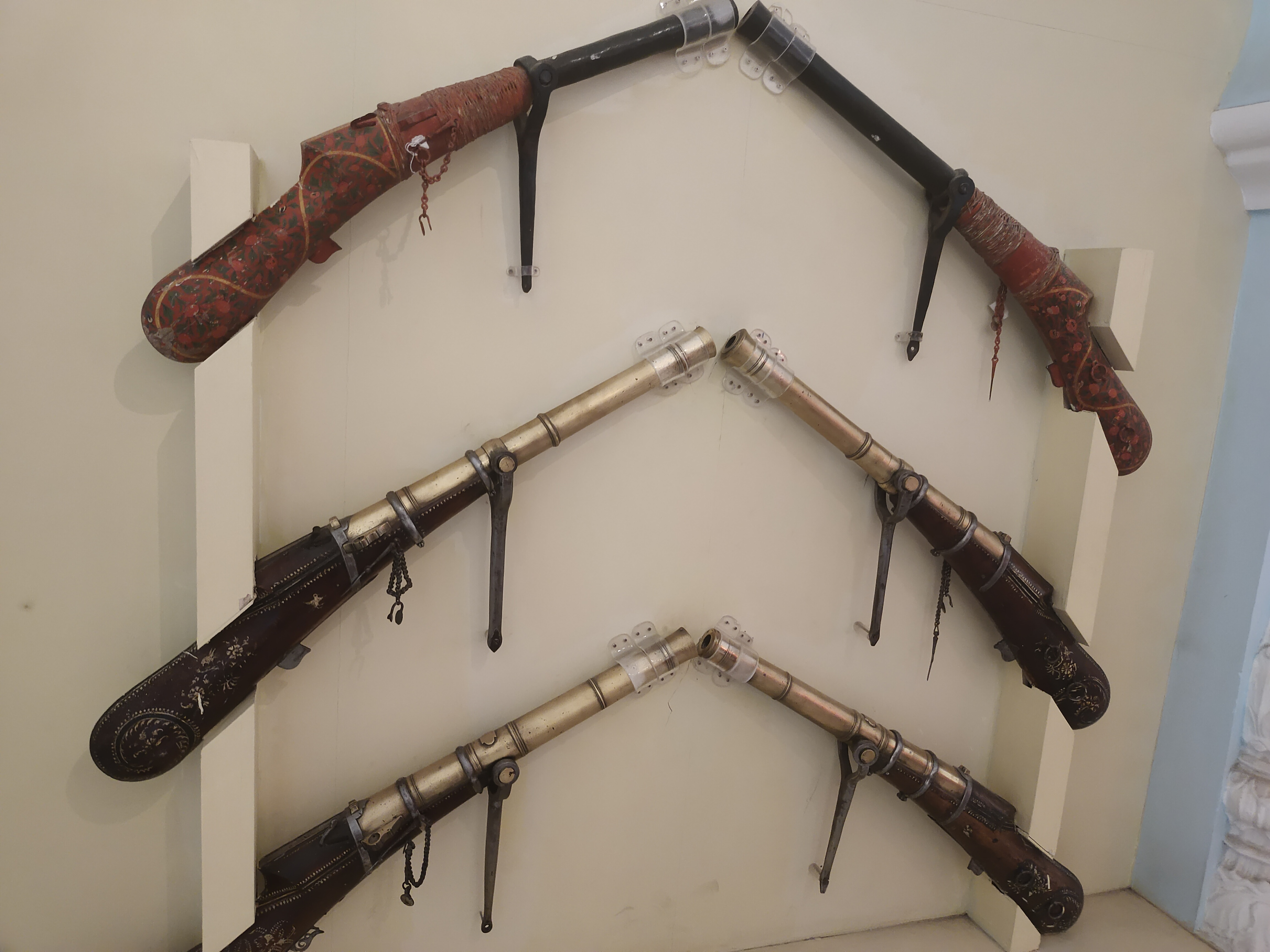
Camel Guns or Swivel Guns

== Significance ==
The fondness of swords for the rulers of Alwar made the art of sword making popular in the kingdom. A number of sword makers, called sikaligar, joined the royal services. Many collaborations with Mughal sword makers were also facilitated. The blades of these swords were made with strong local steel called sakela. Alwar became a centre for making finest swords and many other weapons.

The museum's collection includes manuscripts and other historical objects used in Indological research. The museum also contains examples of pre-modern bookbinding.
