= Ripon Building =

Heritage building in India

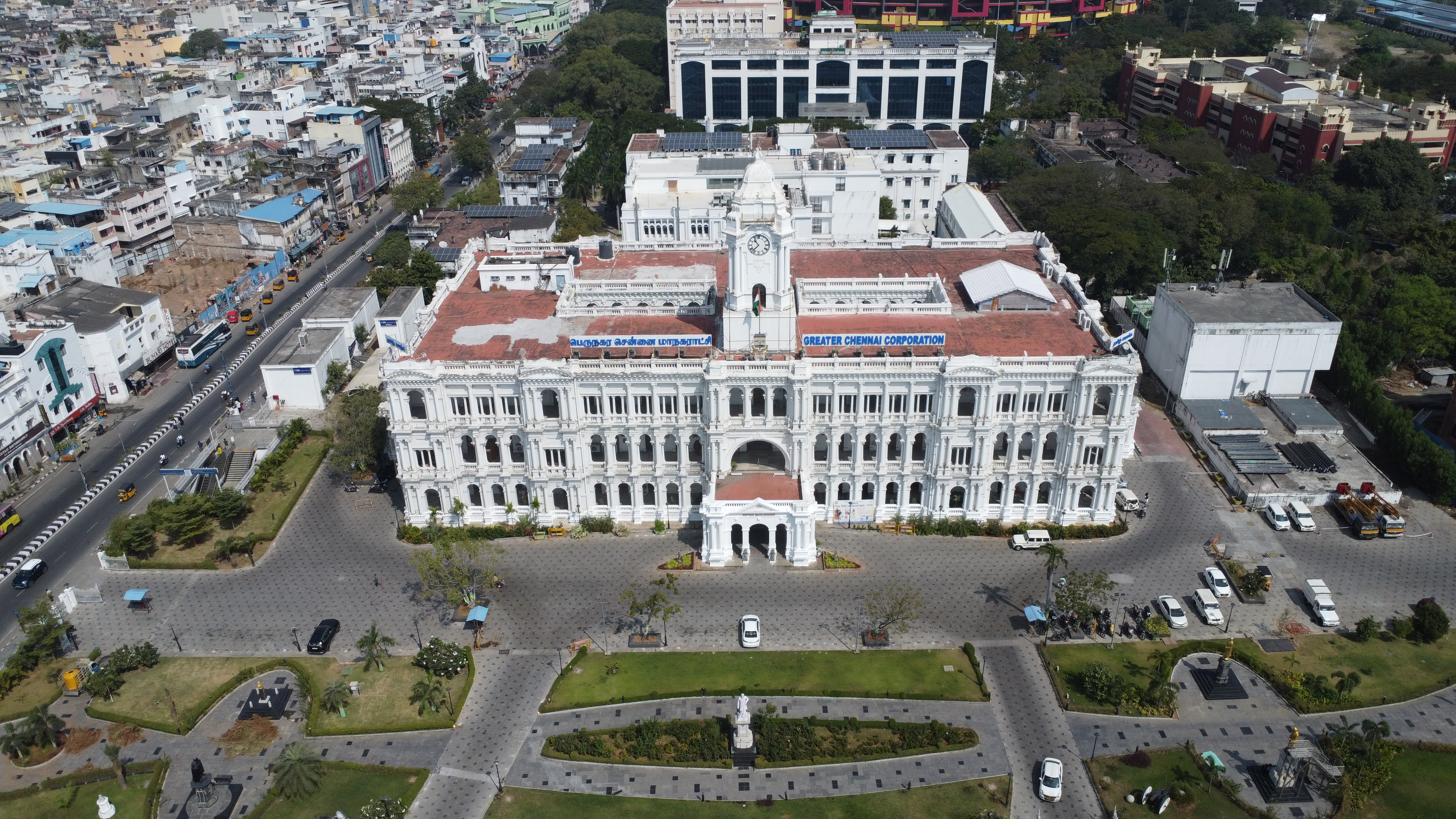
- The Ripon Building in Chennai, India

- Location within Chennai
- Alternative names: Greater Chennai Corporation Headquarters

General information
- Type: Government Buildings
- Architectural style: Neoclassical
- Location: Chennai, India
- Coordinates: 13.0817°N 80.2716°E
- Current tenants: Seat of the Greater Chennai Corporation
- Construction started: 1909; 117 years ago
- Completed: 1913; 113 years ago
- Cost: ₹750,000 (in 1913)
- Owner: Government of Tamil Nadu

The Ripon Building is the seat and headquarters of the Greater Chennai Corporation in Chennai, Tamil Nadu. It is an example of neoclassical architecture, a combination of Ionic and Corinthian styles. The Ripon Building is an all-white structure and is located near the Chennai Central railway station.

== History ==
Commissioned in 1909, the Ripon Building was designed by G.T.S. Harris. The foundation stone was laid by Lord Minto, Viceroy of India, on 11 December 1909. It was built by Loganatha Mudaliar, and took four years to build at a cost of ₹750,000, including a sum of ₹550,000 paid to Mudaliar. The Ripon building was named after Lord Ripon, Governor-General of British India and the Father of local self-government. Earl of Minto, the then Viceroy and Governor General of India laid the foundation on 12 December 1909.

The Municipal Corporation of Madras, after functioning from several other places including Errabalu Chetty Street, settled at Ripon building in 1913, with P. L. Moore as the President of the Municipal Corporation at the time of the inauguration. The inaugural function was attended by over 3,000 of the city's elites.

== Building details ==
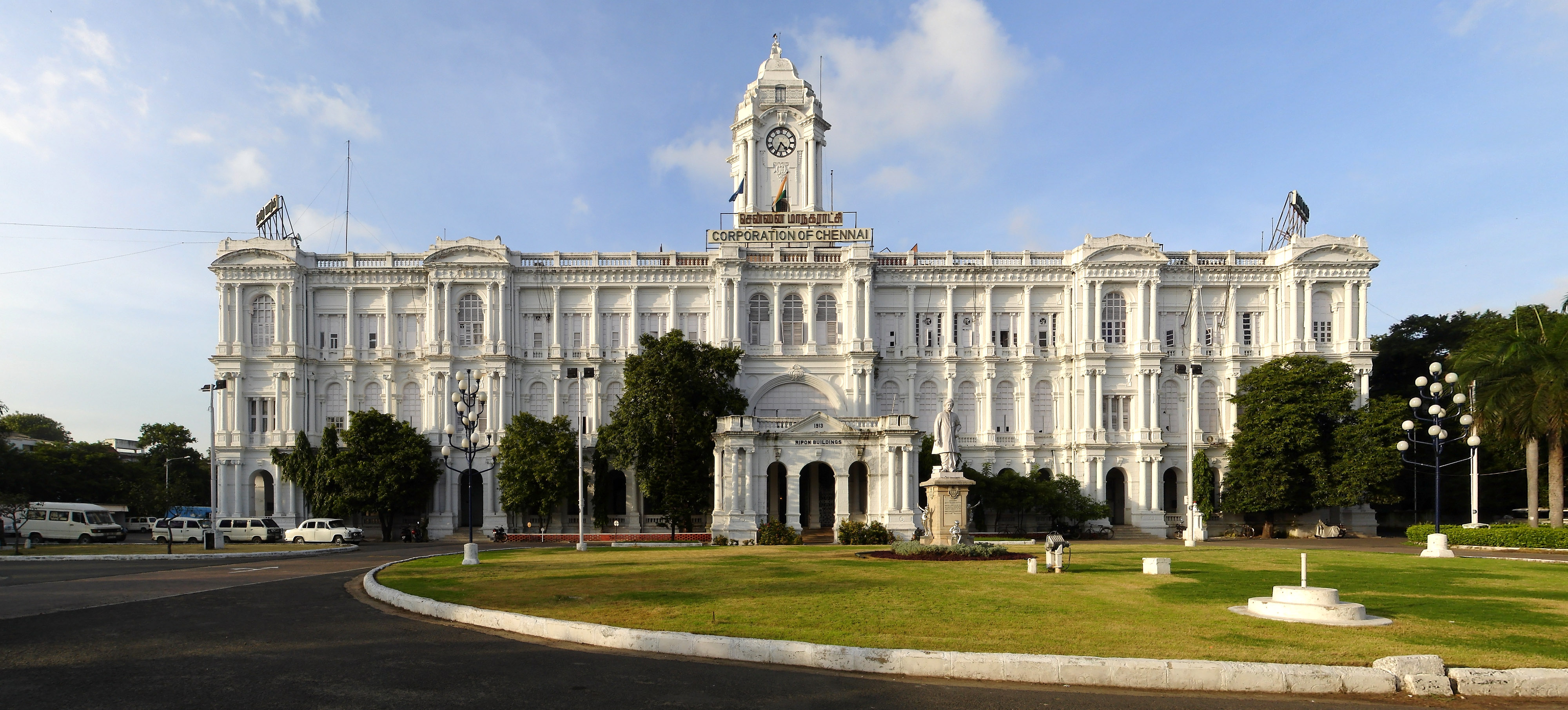
Panorama of the Ripon Building

The building is rectangular, 85 metres (279 ft) long and 32 metres (105 ft) wide, with a 43 metres (141 ft) high central tower containing a clock 2.5 m (8.2 ft) in diameter. The first of its three floors has approximately 2,800 m^{2} (30,139 sq ft) of space. The walls were constructed with stock bricks, set and plastered with lime mortar and the roof is supported with teak wood joists. The original flooring of the ground floor was Cuddapah Slate that has been replaced with marble. In 1913, one of the building's main attractions, the Westminster Quarter chiming clock, was installed by Oakes and Co. The clock has a mechanical key system, which must be wound daily. There are four bells, which were cast by Gillet and Johnston in 1913.

== Annexe building ==
To the rear of the main building is an annexe building (American English: "annex"), inaugurated in September 2015 under the name "Amma Maaligai". All departments of the Chennai Corporation, except the offices of the Mayor and Commissioner, function from the annexe building. The offices of the Mayor and the Commissioner offices are in the main building. The annexe building was constructed at a cost of ₹ 230 million and has a built-up area of 150,000 sq. ft. and a parking space for 50 cars and 150 motorcycles. The building, built with aspects of a green building, could accommodate about 1,000 officials. The building also features a 500-seat auditorium, a 100-seat conference hall and 70 toilets with facilities for disabled people. The building has been able to reduce energy consumption by 20 percent by means of a water-cooled air-conditioning system and heat-reflective tiles on the roof. The building has been designed in a post-modern style, with some elements of traditional architecture. Some design elements would suit the colonial-style architecture of the Ripon Buildings.

== Restoration ==
In 2012, a massive renovation was initiated at a cost of ₹77 million under the Jawaharlal Nehru National Urban Renewal Mission (JNNURM), to preserve the building's original grandeur. Under this, an annexe building measuring 12,540 sq m will be constructed alongside the main structure to house all the departments of the corporation, and all structures in the premises that do not blend in with the main structure aesthetically will be demolished in June 2013 when the annexe building is completed.

The annex building, with an auditorium to seat 500 persons, will be built in a contemporary and post-modern style, highlighting with elements of regional architecture, to blend with the Indo-Saracenic style of the main building. The main building is also being renovated under the process with the use of lime mortar for plastering. It is the first heritage building in the country to have received funds from JNNURM for renovation.

== Gallery ==
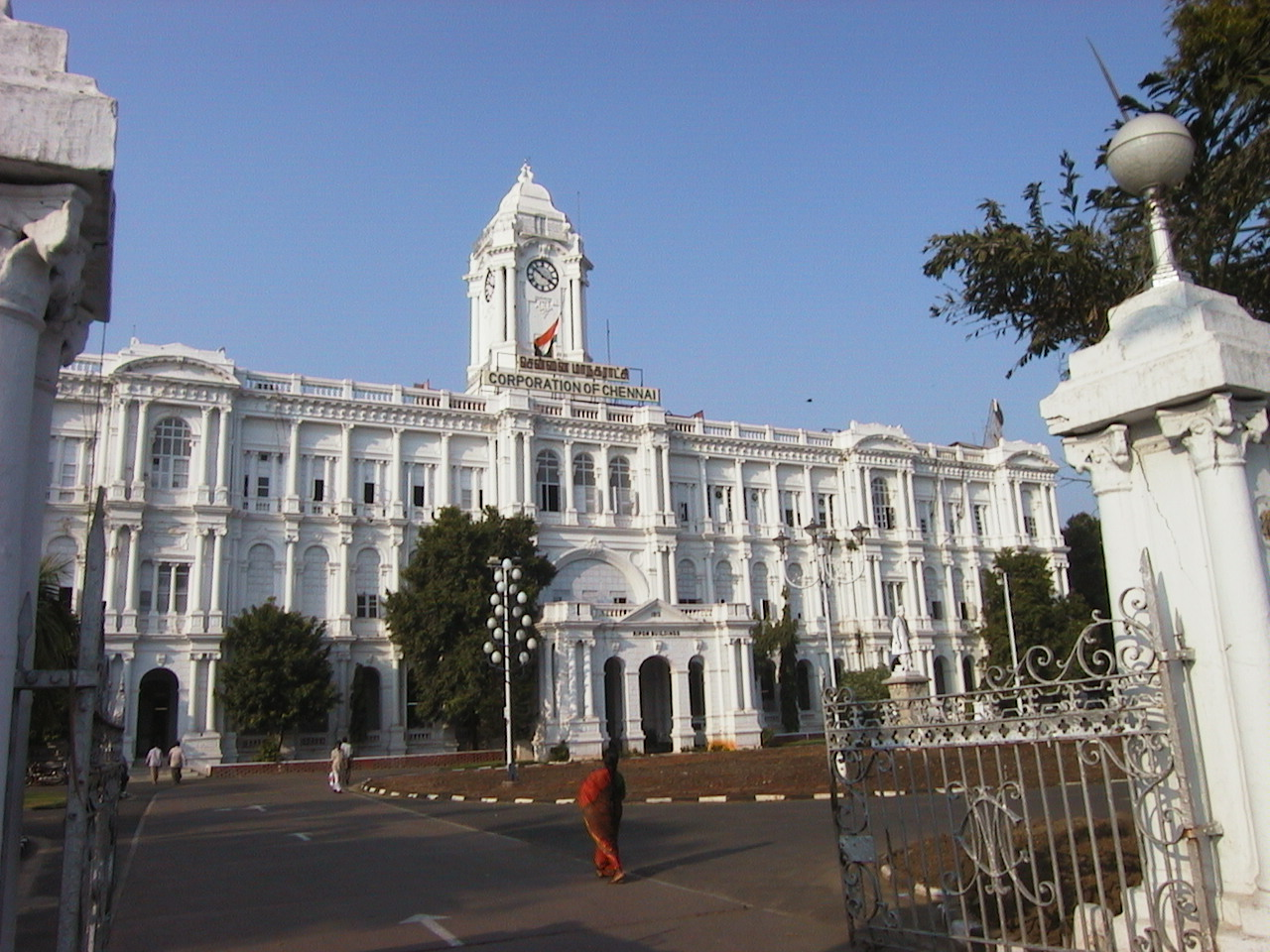
Entrance View

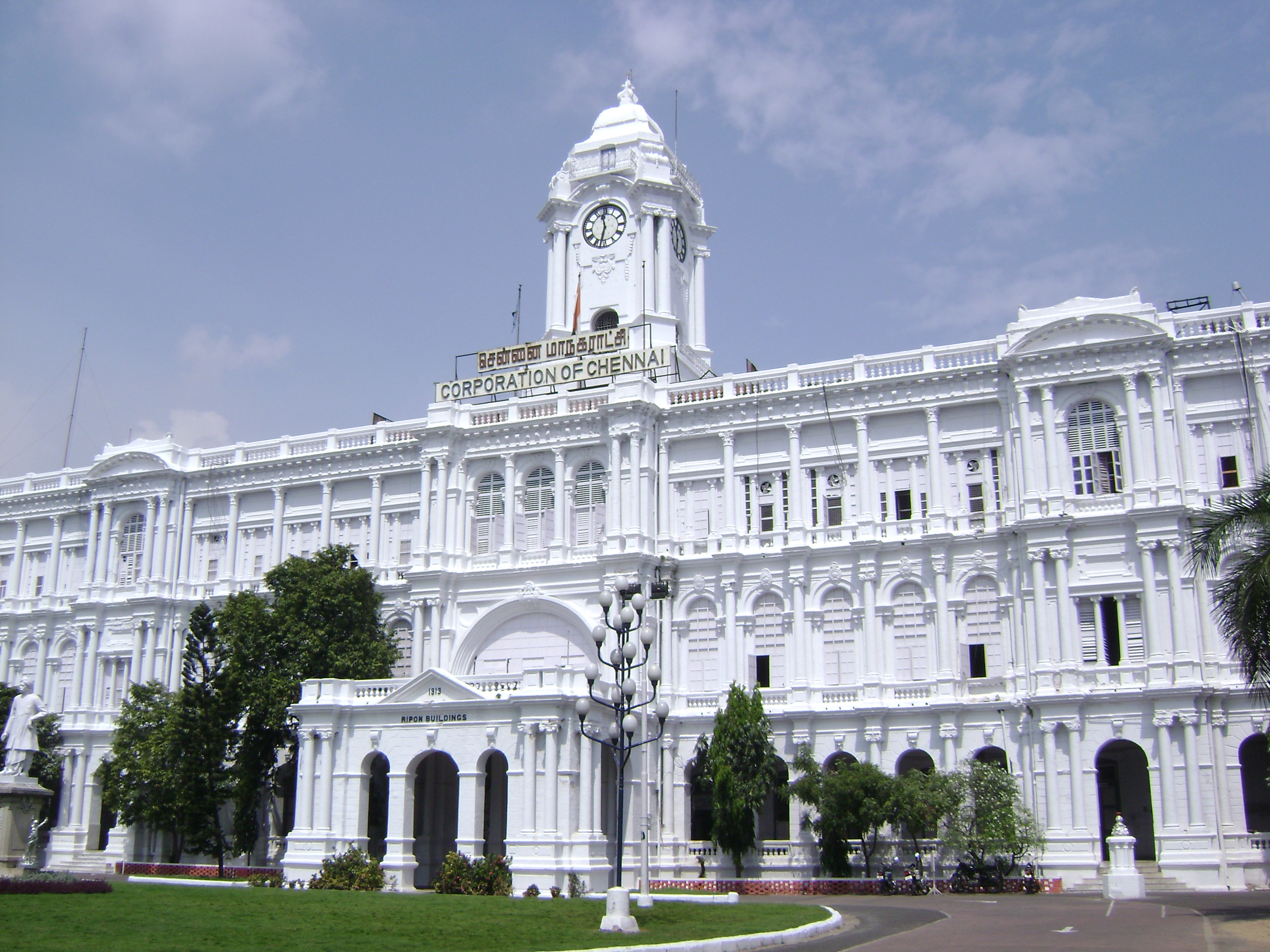
Alternate view

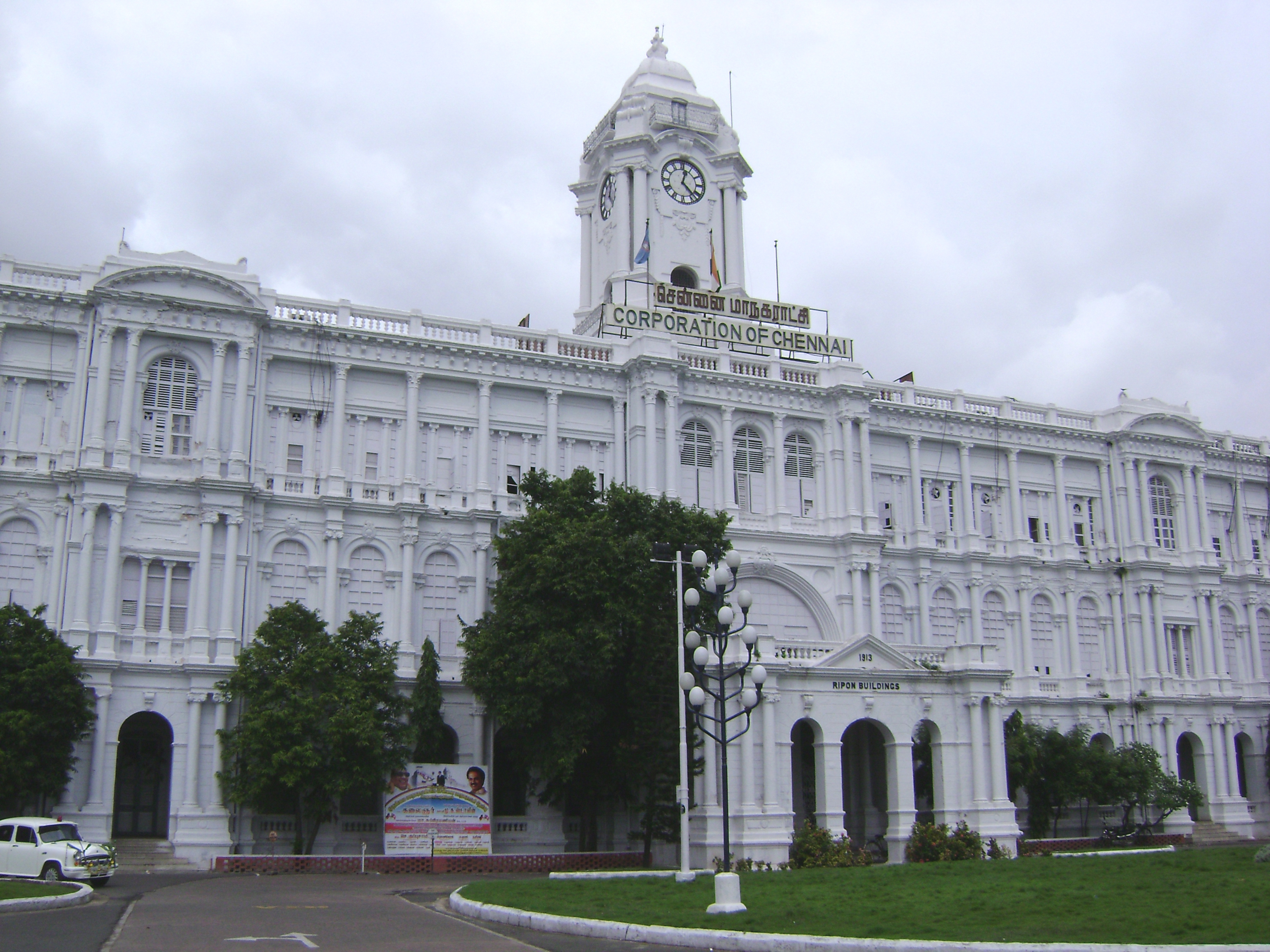
The Ripon Building under dark clouds

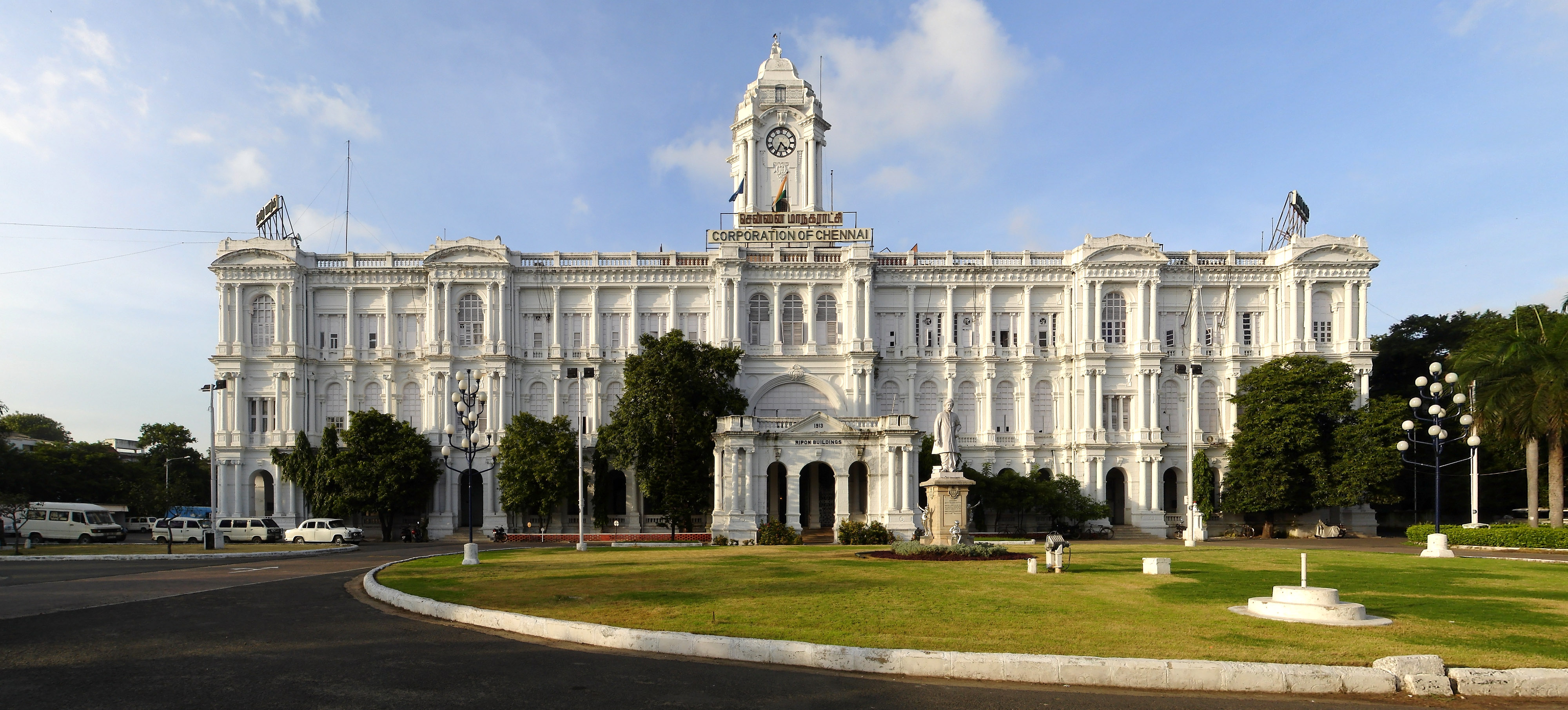
The building's front façade

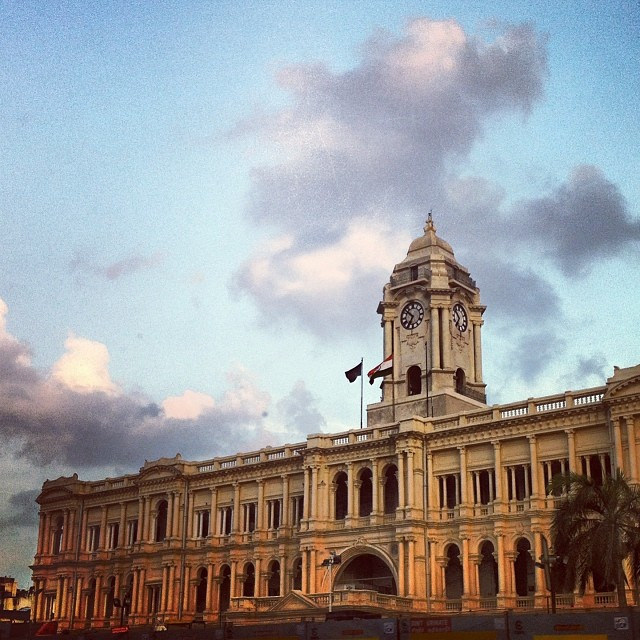
The Ripon Building in 1990

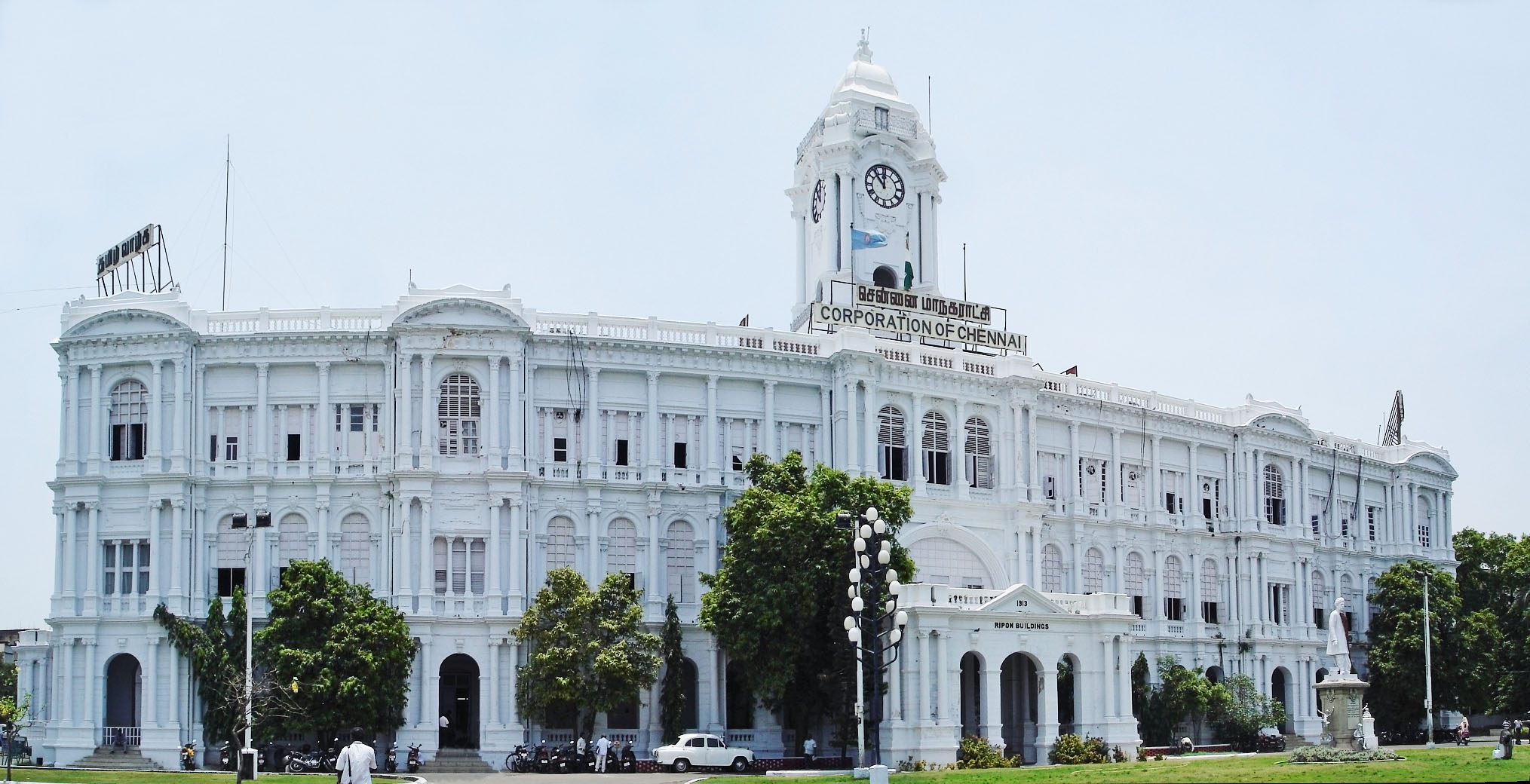
A panoramic view of the Ripon Building

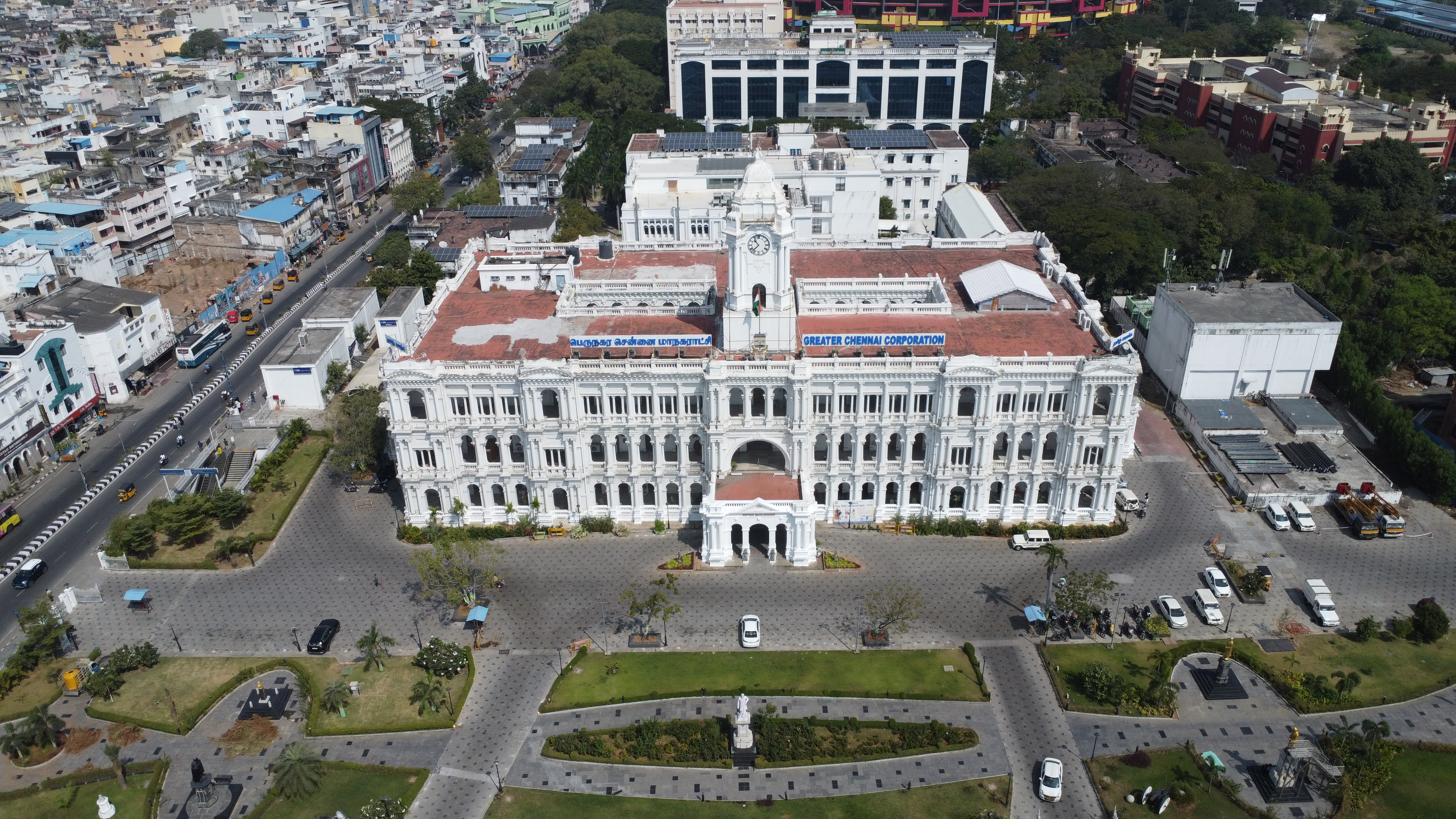
Aerial view

== See also ==
- Architecture of Chennai
- Heritage structures in Chennai
- List of Tamil Nadu Government Estates, Complexes, Buildings and Structures
