= Government Museum, Karur =

The Government Museum, Karur is located in Karur, Tamil Nadu. The Museum houses some of the collections of Roman coins, Chera, chola and pandya discovered during three excavations in 1973, 1977, and 1993, by the archaeological department of Tamil Nadu. The excavations uncovered many Roman coins, precious stones and other iron pieces. In the Amaravathi River bed gold and silver rings are seen.
