= Cuddalore Government Museum =

Coordinates: 11.75543°N 79.76514°E

The Government Museum, Manjakuppam, Cuddalore, Tamil Nadu, India, was established in the year 1989. This museum collection represents history, culture, flora and fauna of the district. Natural History specimens include South Indian Timbers, Fibres, Swan, Bear, Lizard and Snakes. Wood fossils and Ammonite fossils are also on display.

Imparting knowledge to researchers, students and public through popular lectures, exhibitions and training programmes form part of educational activities

A Sculpture Garden in the museum welcomes the visitors. In this sculpture garden Sivalinga, Nandhi, Vishnu, monkey sculptures, Narashima, Surya and Chandikeswara are displayed. The development of Tamil script, dinosaur model and a model of Kali sculpture made of Fibre glass are kept in the entrance of the building.

The stone sculptures like Subramanya, Surya, Navanitha Krishna, Dakshinamurthi, Bhairava, Virabhadra, and Saptamatrika sculptures are best examples to the sculptural wealth of our ancestors. Bronze images of Ganesa, Vishnu, Nataraja, Somaskanda, Krishna are displayed in the Bronze Gallery.

In the first floor Kattunaickkan tribal materials, Stone Age tools, musical instruments, agricultural implements of Kalvarayan hill tribes are displayed.

== Address ==
Government Museum 19 Hospital Road Cuddalore – 607 001
