= Marina Beach =

Beach in Chennai, India

Coordinates: 13.05418°N 80.28368°E

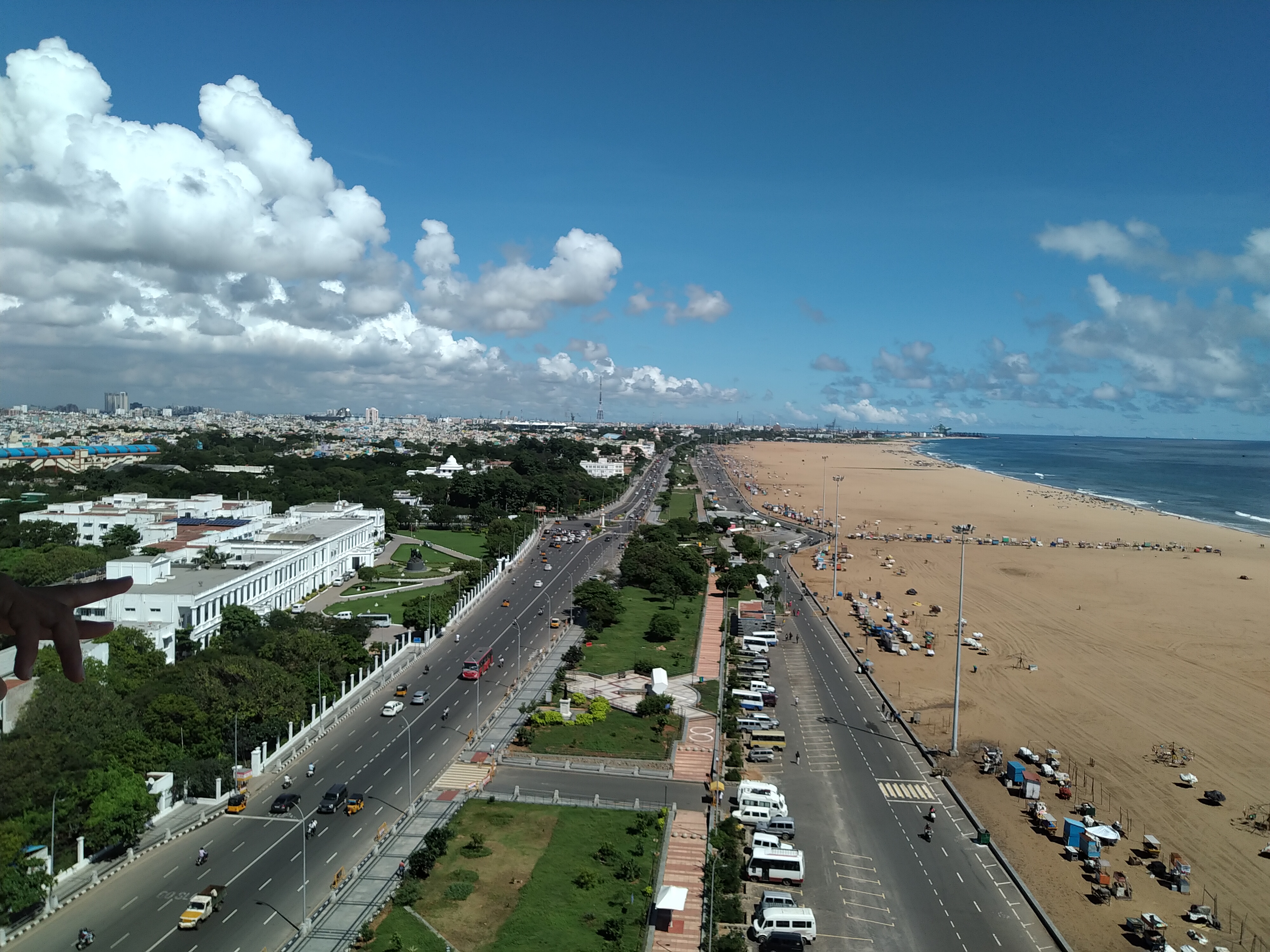
- Marina Beach as seen from the Chennai Lighthouse Marina Beach as seen from the Chennai Lighthouse
- Location: Chennai, Tamil Nadu, India
- Coast: Coromandel, Bay of Bengal
- Type: Urban, natural sandy beach
- Demarcated: 1884; 142 years ago
- Total length: 13 km (8.1 mi)
- Length of promenade: 6 km (3.7 mi)
- Maximum width: 437 m (1,434 ft)
- Orientation: North–South
- Notable landmarks: Lighthouse, Anna Memorial, M.G.R. and Amma Memorial, Napier Bridge
- Governing authority: Corporation of Chennai

Marina Beach, or simply the Marina, is a natural urban beach in Chennai, Tamil Nadu, India, along the Bay of Bengal. The beach runs from near Fort St. George in the north to Foreshore Estate in the south, a distance of 6.0 km (3.7 mi), It is a prominent landmark in Chennai.

The Marina is a primarily sandy beach, with an average width of 300 m (980 ft) and the width at the widest stretch is 437 m (1,434 ft). Bathing and swimming at the Marina are legally prohibited because of the dangers, as the undercurrent is very turbulent. It is one of the most crowded beaches in the country and attracts about 30,000 visitors a day during weekdays and 50,000 visitors a day during the weekends and on holidays. During summer months, about 15,000 to 20,000 people visit the beach daily.

== History ==
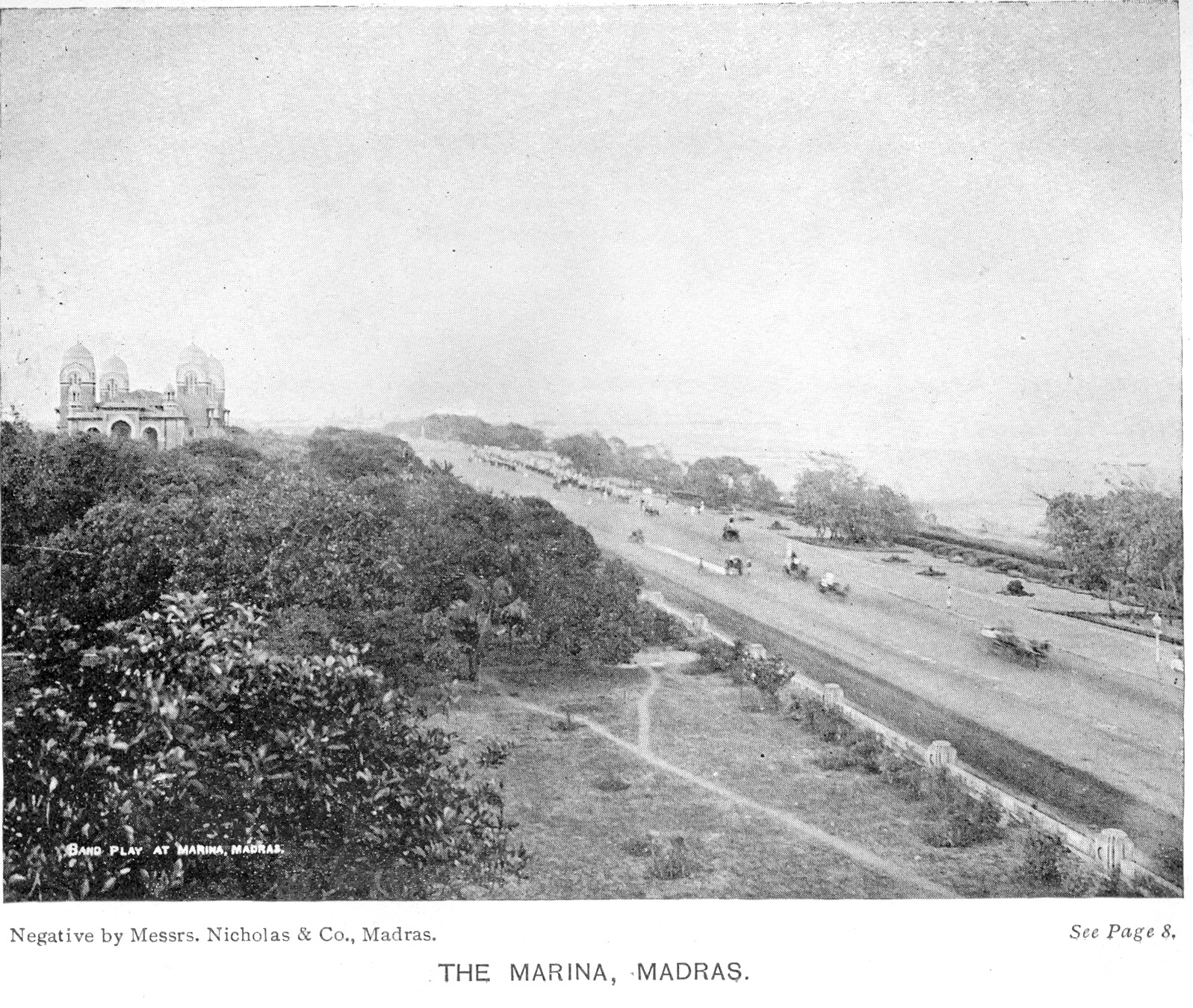
The beach promenade in 1913

Before the 16th century, there were frequent incident of inundation of land near the coast due to rise in sea level. When the sea withdrew, several ridges and lagoons were left behind. On the southern side of Fort St. George, one such sand ridge ran from the mouth of the Cooum River to the present site of the Presidency College. On the rear side of the ridge was a huge depression on which the college grounds were later developed. The ridge is the site of the present-day beach. When Fort St. George was built in 1640, the sea was too close to the fort. The building of the harbor near the fort resulted in sand accretion to the south of the fort and the harbor and the sea, which was washing the ramparts of the fort, moved afar at about 2.5 km away from the fort creating a wide beach between the land and the sea.

Before the Madras harbor was built, the beach was just a strip of mud, teeming with mudskippers. The beach washed up close to the present day road for a long time until the harbor was built in 1881. Mount Stuart Elphinstone Grant Duff, the governor of Madras from 1881 to 1886, who was captivated by the beach on an earlier visit to the city in the late 1870s, conceived and built the promenade along the beach in 1884 by extensively modifying and layering with soft sand. He also gave it the name Madras Marina in the same year. Since the early 19th century, a number of public buildings were constructed fronting the beach.

Ever since the harbor was built, the area south of the port has accreted significantly, forming the present day's beach mainly due to the presence of wave breakers laid for the construction of the harbor, although the coast in the northern region has undergone severe erosion. Eventually, the north-drifting current widened the beach to its present extent. The beach was formed as a result of arresting the littoral drift by the port's breakwater. The area of the beach is increasing 40 sq m every year due to progradation.

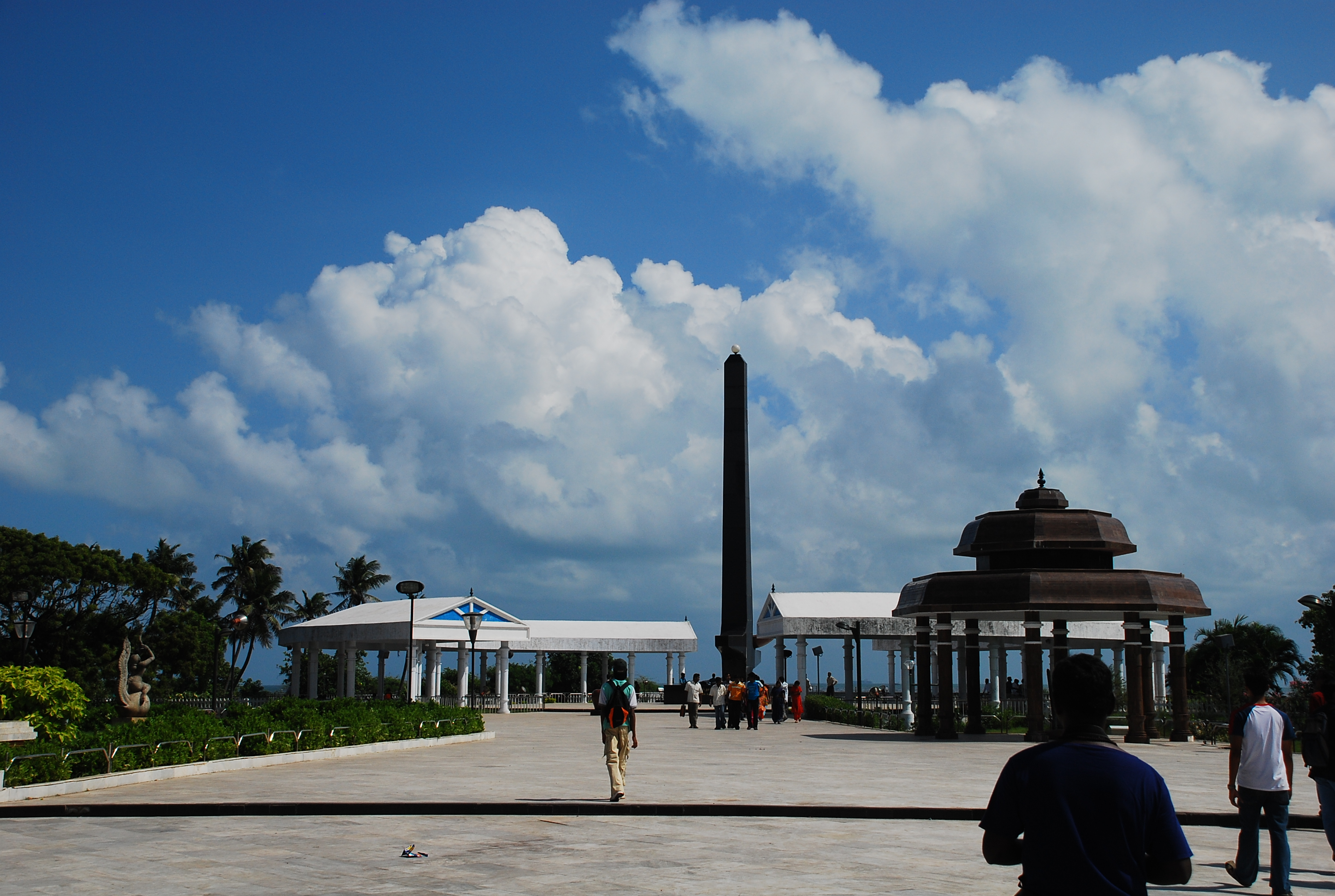
C. N. Annadurai's Memorial

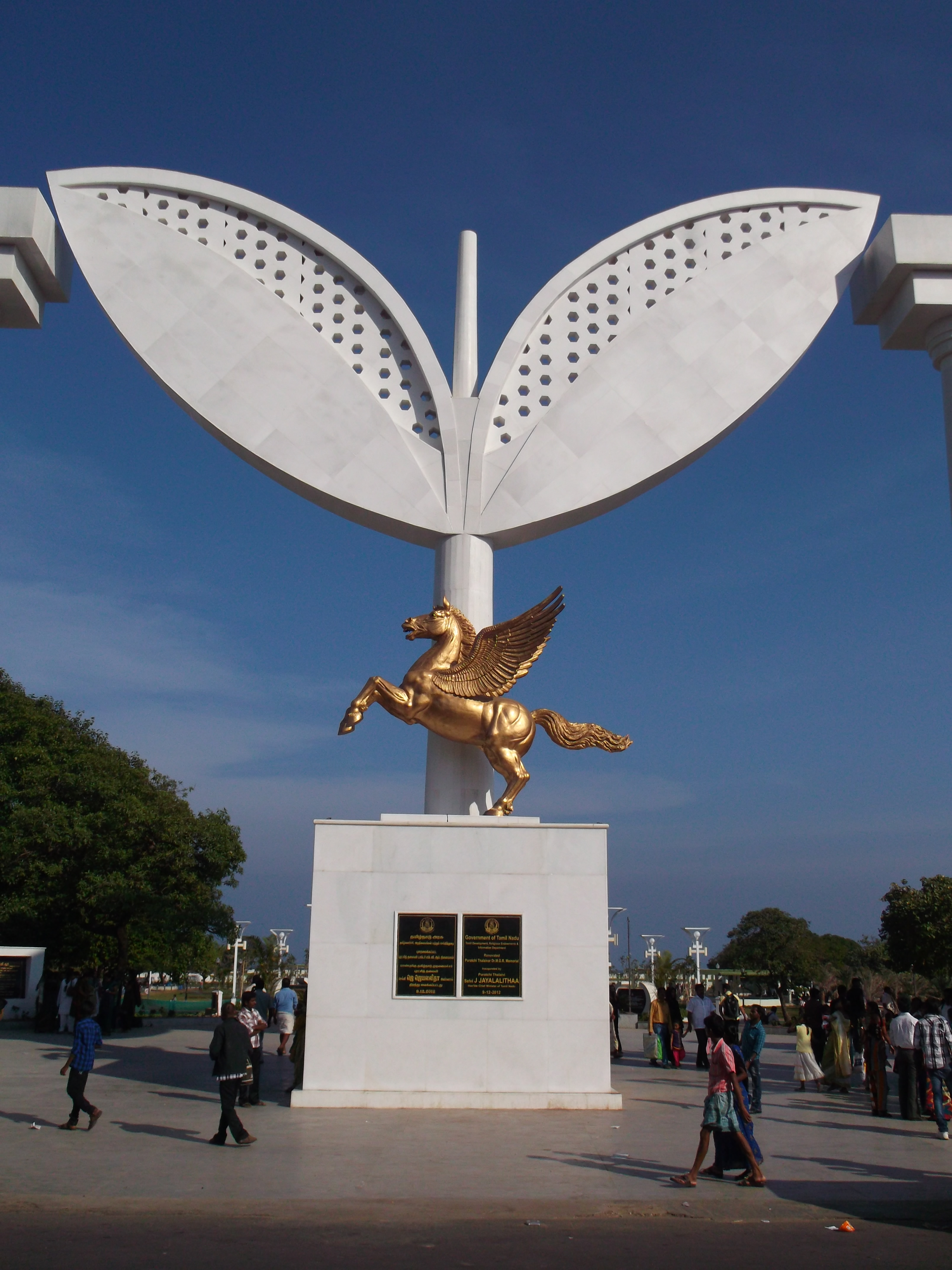
M.G.R. and Amma Memorial

Since the creation of the promenade in 1884, there were several additions along the stretch. The country's first aquarium was established as one of the first additions in 1909. Shortly after the Independence, the Triumph of Labour statue and the Gandhi statue in 'march to Dandi' stride, which has been duplicated on the lawns of the Parliament House, were erected on the beach. In 1968, a number of statues of icons of Tamil literature was erected to mark the first World Tamil Conference, including Avvaiyar, Tiruvalluvar, Kambar, Subramania Bharathiyar, Bharathidasan, the Dravidologist Caldwell, G. U. Pope and Veeramamunivar. Anna memorial was built in 1970 and the M.G.R. and Amma Memorial in 1988, shortening the stretch at its northern end. Later addition was a statue for Kamaraj. In December 2016, the then chief minister of Tamil Nadu J. Jayalalithaa was also buried here, inside the M.G.R. Memorial campus and a foundation stone for construction of a memorial for her there has been laid. On 8 August 2018, former chief minister of Tamil Nadu M. Karunanidhi was buried beside his mentor Annadurai at the Marina Beach.

== Ecology ==
=== Environment ===
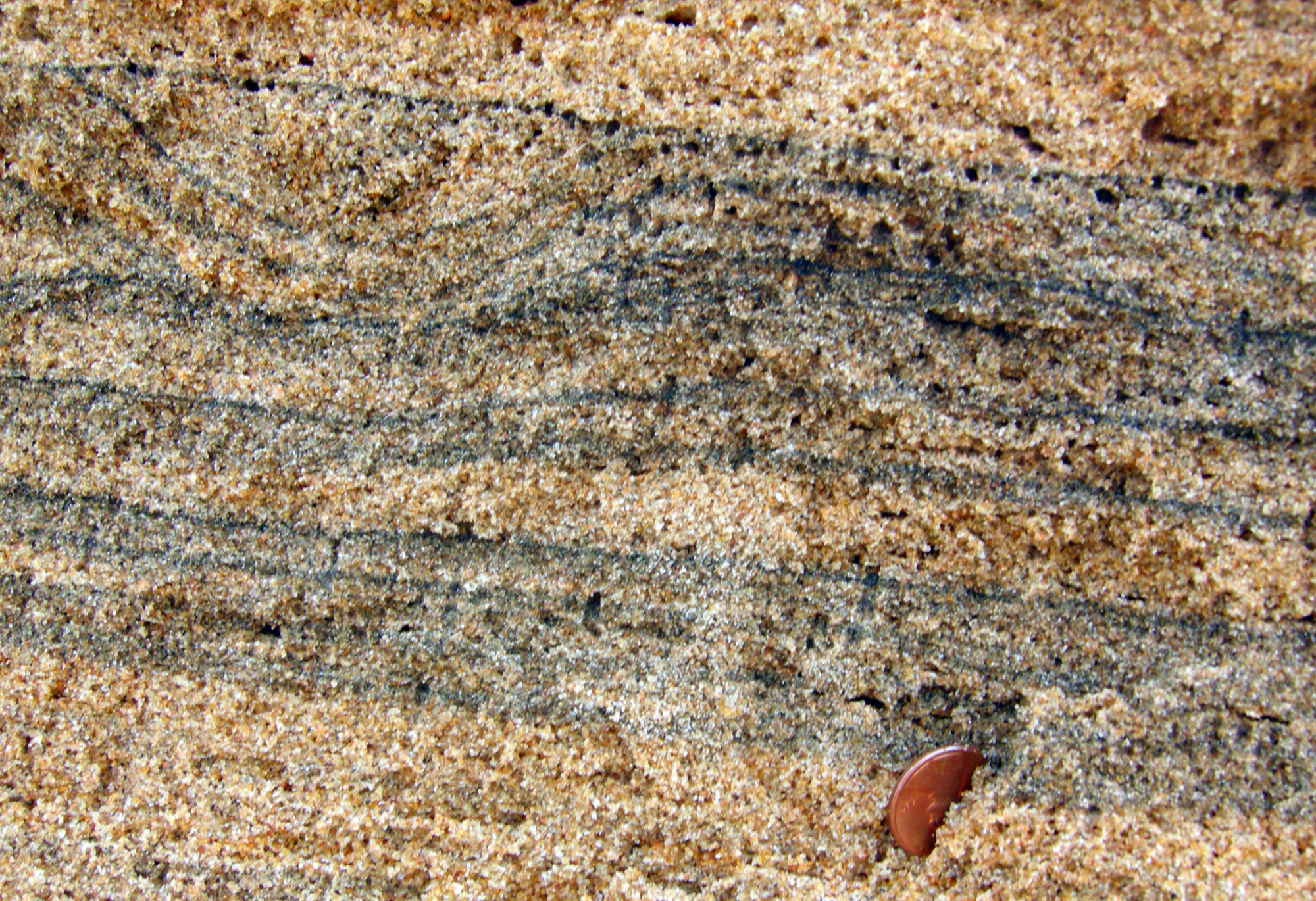
Magnetite and other heavy minerals (dark) in the beach's quartz sand

The Marina beach was famed for its pristine beauty, jolly ambiance, and rich ecosystems. However, since the middle of the 20th century, the beach and water have become polluted. Proliferation of plastic bags, human waste, and other pollutants have rendered many parts of the beach unusable. In recent years, many voluntary organizations have taken up the task of cleaning up the Marina and protecting the ecosystem. Particular efforts include protection of olive ridley turtle nests along the Neelankarai section of the beach.

=== Flora and fauna ===
Marina Beach lies on the stretch of coast where olive ridley sea turtles, a species classified as Schedule 1 of the Indian Wildlife Protection Act of 1972 (critically endangered), nest during mating season, chiefly between late October and April peaking from mid-January to mid-February. The Ennore–Mamallapuram zone, on which the beach lies, is one of the three major nesting grounds on the Indian coast. However, with the expansion of the shrimp trawling fishery in the eastern coast of India in the mid-1970s, several individuals of the species are washed ashore dead every year. The eggs laid by the females along the beach are also sold in the local market by the fishermen and traders. In 1977, a recovery program was started by the Central Marine Fisheries Research Institute. Many volunteer organizations in the city, such as the Students' Sea Turtle Conservation Network and the Sea Turtle Protection Force of the TREE Foundation, get involved in conservation of the species along the coast.

Meiofaunal composition at the Marina Beach chiefly includes turbellarians, nematodes, polychaetes, oligochaetes, and harpacticoids. Species of gastrotrichs are also found in the region.

Common fishes found along the beach include mullets, sharks, silver bellies, rays, ribbon fish, skates, whitebait, dussumieria, Jew fish, horse mackerel, crabs, seer, pellona, pomfret, perches, lactarius, lethrinus, flying fish, engraulis, sardines, lobsters, sabre fish, barracuda, hilsa, tunny fish, Indian salmon, leather jackets, cookup, breams, catfish, snappers, synagris, bonito, soles, polynemus, and prawns, among others.

== Dimensions and characteristics ==
The Marina is a natural urban sandy beach along the Coramandel coast on the Bay of Bengal. Primarily sandy, the beach spans about 13 km (8.1 mi), running from near Fort St. George in the north to Besant Nagar in the south and is the longest natural urban beach in India. The average width of the beach is 300 m (980 ft) and the width at the widest stretch is 437 m (1,434 ft).

== Infrastructure and activities ==
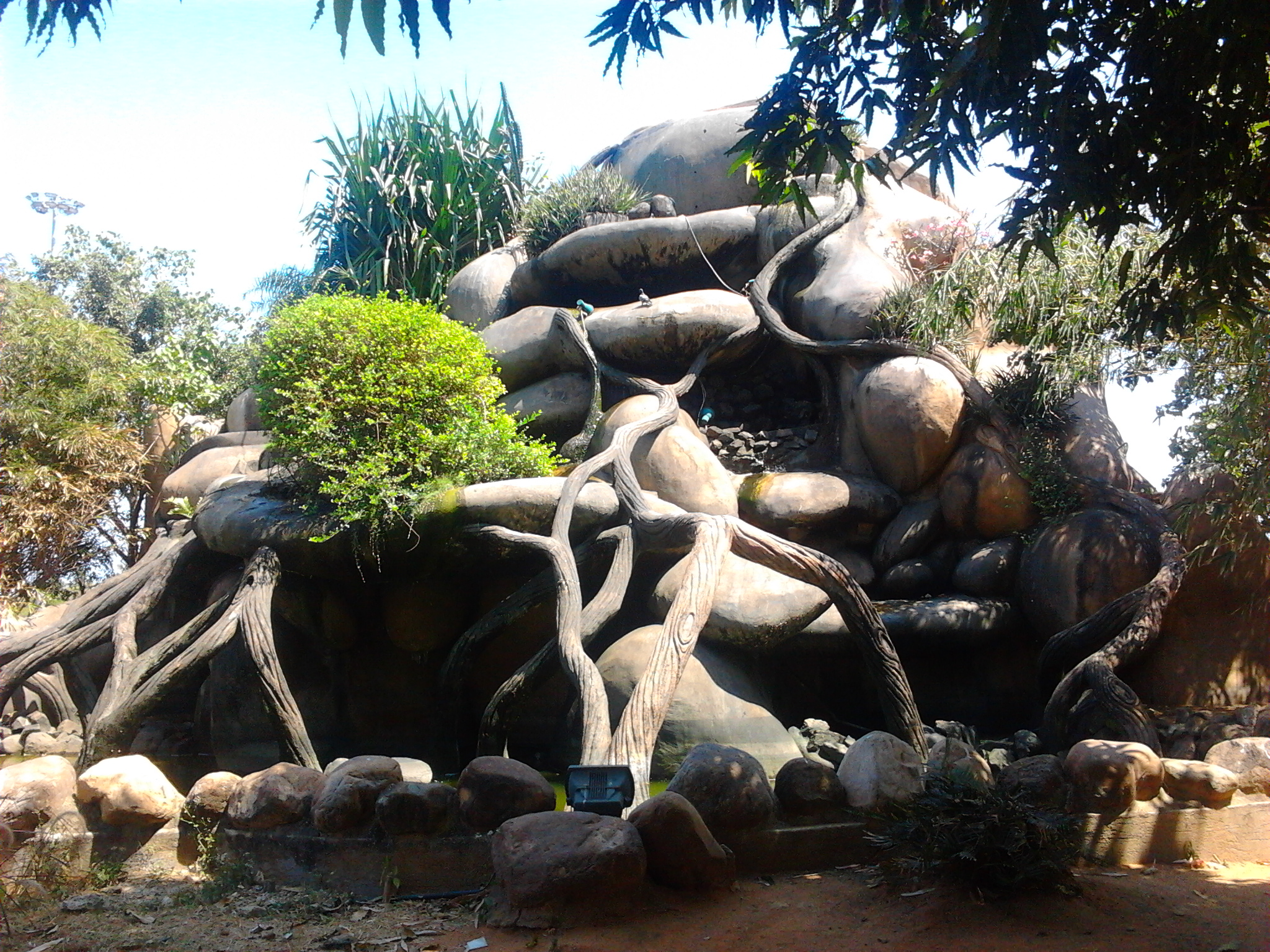
The Rock Fountain

Marina beach is a major tourist attraction of the city. It is also the main place for the local people to escape from the summer heat. The beach is popular for its shops and food stalls run by about 500 shops run by about 1,212 vendors. The memorials and statues, morning walk, joggers' track, lovers' spot, aquarium, and the like make it a hangout for people of all ages. Kite flying and beach cricket are common sports at the beach, and there are also facilities for pony rides. Beach cricket at the Marina dates back several decades. However, Chennai City Police has banned it at different points due to its interference with traffic and beach walkers. The sea is generally rough and waves are strong. There are fishermen colonies present at both ends of the beach. There are also joyrides, merry-go-rounds and mini giant wheels along the stretch, although they are installed without permission from any government agency.

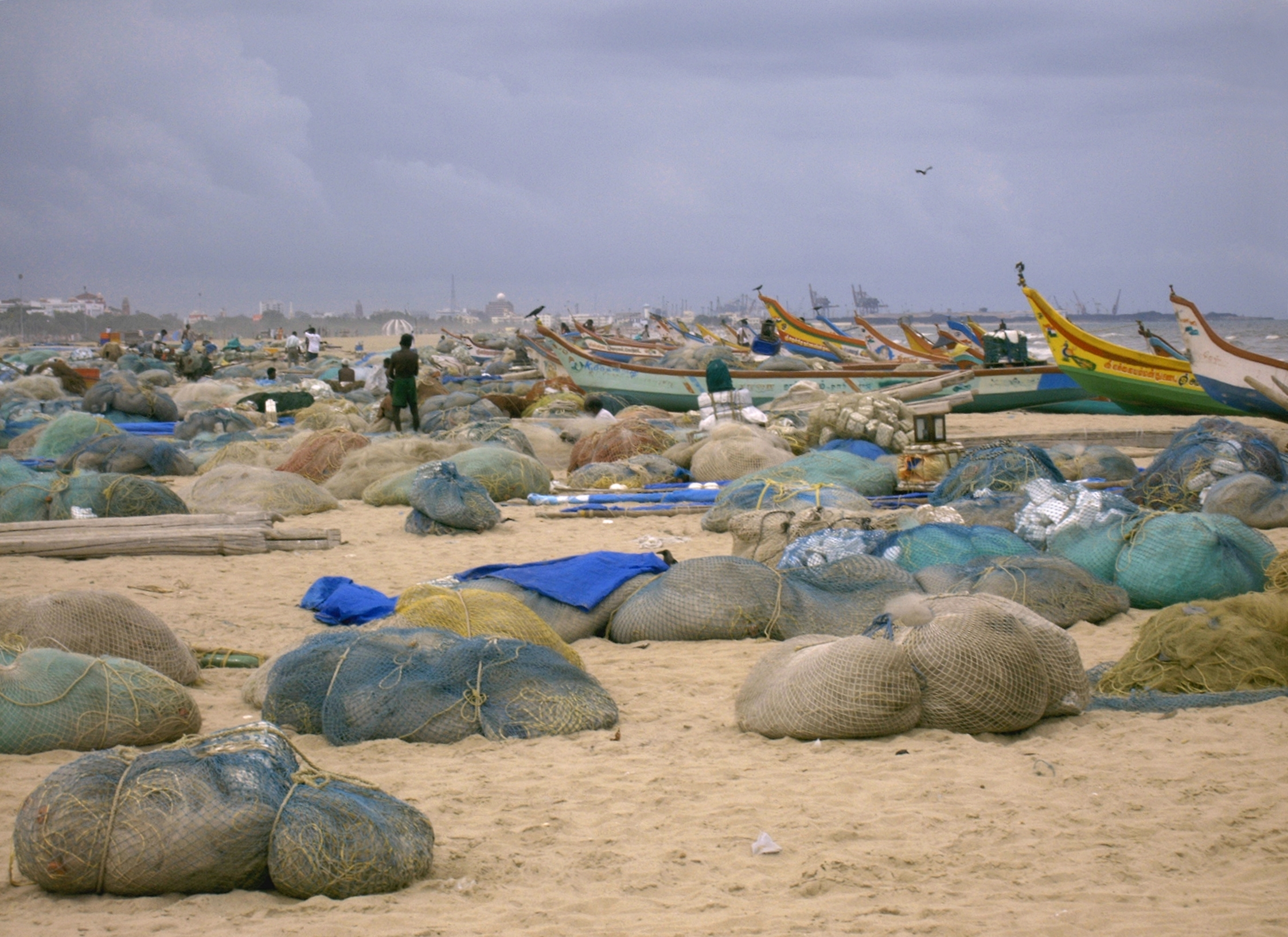
Fishing nets on the beach

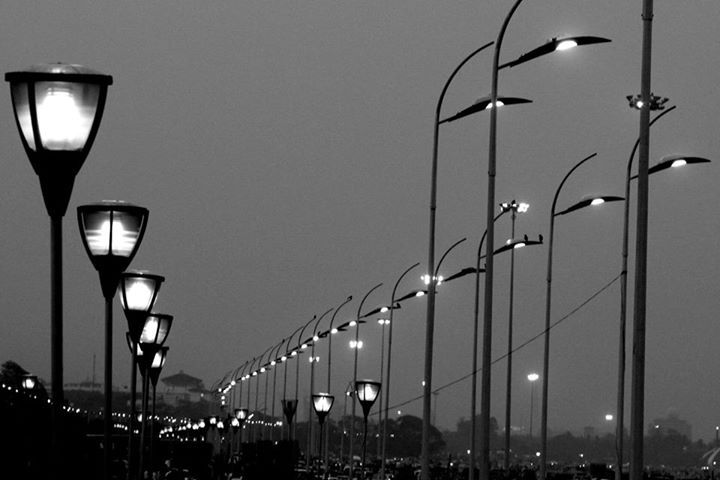
A night view of the beach promenade

There are two swimming pools along the stretch—the Marina swimming pool and the Anna swimming pool. The Marina swimming pool was built in 1947 and is located on a 1.5-acre compound opposite the Presidency College. The pool is 100 m long and 34 m wide, bigger than the standard Olympic pool size of 50 m × 25 m and is 3 to 5.5 feet (0.91 to 1.68 m) deep. The shallow end is 3.5 feet deep. It is maintained by Corporation of Chennai. It underwent renovation in 1994, 2004, and 2009 (at ₹7 million). On an average, the swimming pool receives 1,500 people. During the summer months of April and May, the footfall goes up to 2,500 people. The pool can accommodate around 400 people at any given time and has 10 cloak rooms. As of 2018, there were 30 staff in the pool and six surveillance cameras. The Anna swimming pool is located opposite the clock tower building of the University of Madras and virtually remains hidden behind the Anna Square bus terminus. The pool is said to be the first Olympic size pool to be built in Tamil Nadu. It was constructed in 1976 with a diving board. However, the diving board was removed later during a renovation. The pool is 4 to 11 feet (1.2 to 3.4 m) deep. It also has a toddler pool that is 2.5 feet (0.76 m). Sports Development Authority of Tamil Nadu (SDAT) conducts regular coaching camps at the pool.

The oval-shaped skating arena at the beach has an outer railing and standing area for people to watch from.

As part of the 'Chennai Forever' initiative by the Tamil Nadu government, a 34-foot (10 m) tall, artificial waterfall was installed in September 2005 at a cost of ₹ 1.5 million. A visitor center near the Cooum River mouth on the Marina, similar to the Marina Barrage Visitor Centre in Singapore and San Antonio Visitor Center in the United States, has been planned as part of an initiative to create awareness of the need for clean waterways.

In 2008, two floating fountains with spray height of 100 feet with color lights for night view were planned to be installed in sea waters off the beach. In 2010, the Chennai Corporation procured new cleaning equipment to clean the beach at a cost of ₹ 8.011 million. These included a sand-cleaning machine capable of cleaning 15,000 m^{2} area in an hour procured at a cost of ₹ 3.267 million, three skid steer loaders to clean narrow lanes commissioned at a cost of ₹ 2.652 million, imported lawn mower, ride-on mechanical sweeper, tree pruner and hedge trimmer. An automatic ticket-vending machine at a cost of ₹ 170,000 was also commissioned at the Marina swimming pool for managing the crowd. The corporation also planned to construct two more public conveniences at the beach. About 150 corporation staff, including a junior engineer, maintains the lawns and service lanes on the beach.

As of 2013, the 3.1-km stretch of the beach from the Triumph of Labor statue to the lighthouse has 31 high-mast lamps.

According to police statistics, about 5,000 people use the 2-km-long Loop Road daily for their morning walk.

As of 2017, there were 1,544 vendors on the beach, which increased to 1,962 by 2019. In 2019, the Corporation decided to restrict the licensed vendors to 900. There are toilets at six locations across the stretch and about 175 sanitary workers deployed at the beach on shift basis.

The beach had facility to park 2,271 two-wheelers, 457 cars, and 80 vans and buses.

== Structures along the beach ==
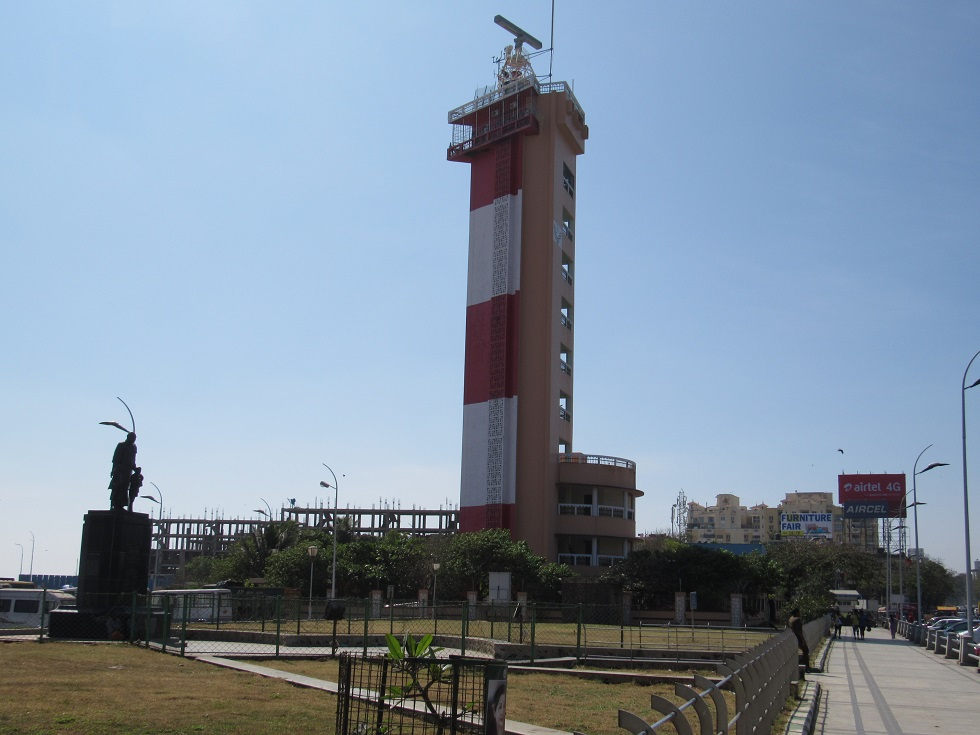
Chennai lighthouse as seen from Marina Beach

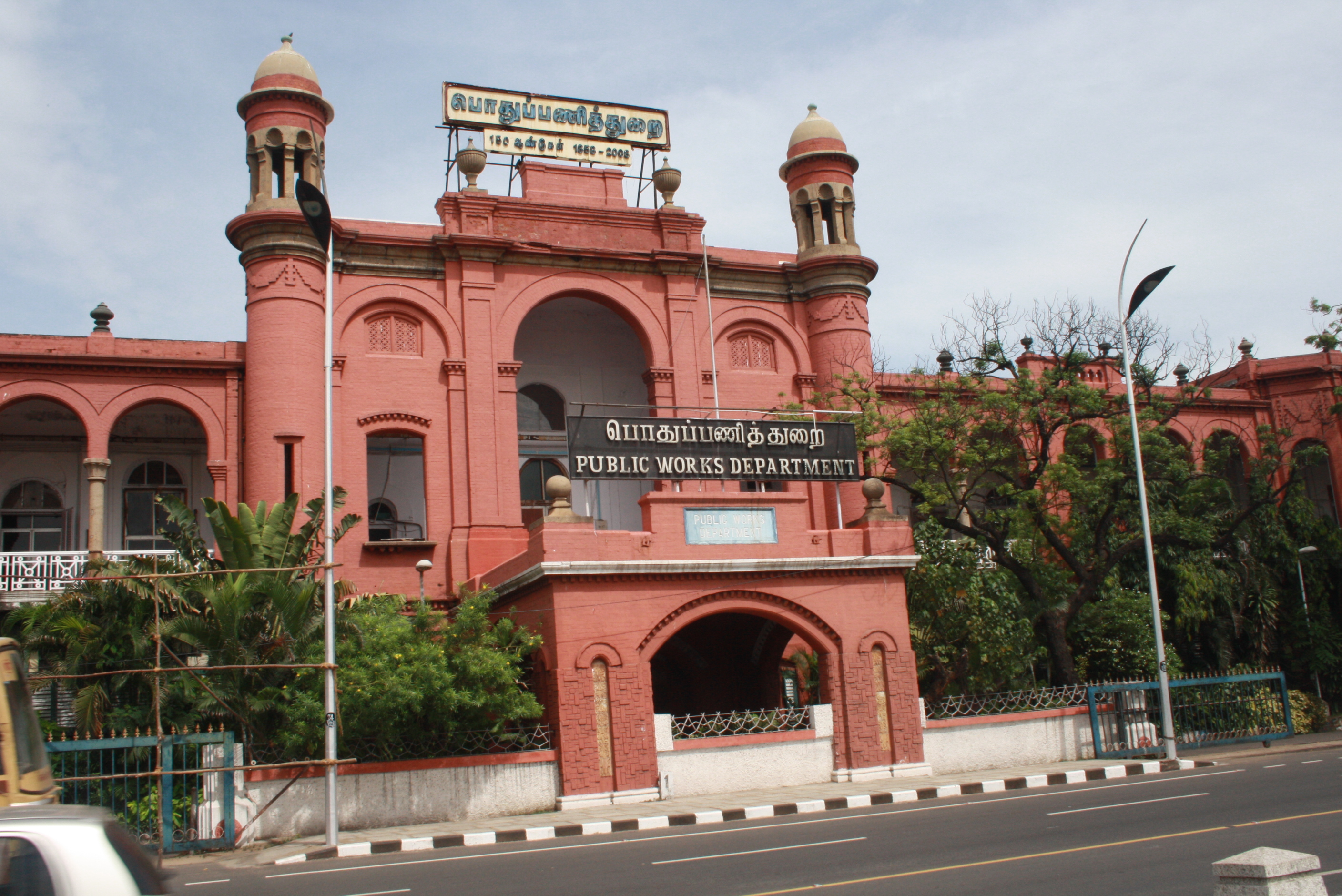
PWD Complex

Being the city's primary area for recreation, the entire stretch features numerous statues and monuments that have come up over the years along the beach promenade, called Kamaraj Salai. While the beach stretches along the eastern side of the road, the western side is dotted with various governmental institutions and historic and stately buildings from the British rule all along its length. Victory War Memorial, a memorial for the warriors who lost their lives in the World Wars, marks the northern end of the beach. Memorials for C. N. Annadurai, M. G. Ramachandran, J. Jayalalithaa and M. Karunanidhi, former chief ministers of Tamil Nadu, are present on the northern end of the promenade known as the Anna Square. As of May 2018, a Lilliputian Children's Traffic Park was under construction near the Anna Memorial adjacent to the Anna Swimming Pool at a cost of ₹ 20.7 million. The traffic park measures 4,140 square meters, with facilities such as a viewing gallery, walking track, children's play area, traffic sign boards, and a riding track.

All along the length of the promenade, stone statues adorn the roadside area of the beach starting from the Triumph of Labour statue, the first statue erected in the beach, near the memorials at the Anna Square to Mahatma Gandhi statue near the lighthouse. Most statues are of national or local legends while others have symbolic significance like the Triumph of Labour statue. The statues along the promenade are (from north to south):

- Robert Caldwell (erected on 2 January 1968)
- Kambar (erected on 2 January 1968)
- Ilango Adigal (erected on 7 November 1971)
- Triumph of Labor (erected on 25 January 1959)
- Bharathiyar (erected on 2 January 1968)
- Kannagi statue (erected on 2 January 1968/re-erected on 3 June 2006)
- Subhas Chandra Bose (erected on 15 December 1997)
- Thiruvalluvar (erected on 2 January 1968)
- George Uglow Pope (erected on 2 January 1968)
- Annie Besant
- Bharathidasan (erected on 2 January 1968)
- Swami Vivekananda (erected on 12 July 1964)
- Avvaiyar (erected on 2 January 1968)
- Mahatma Gandhi (erected on 14 April 1959)
- Veerama Munivar (erected on 2 January 1968)
- Kamaraj
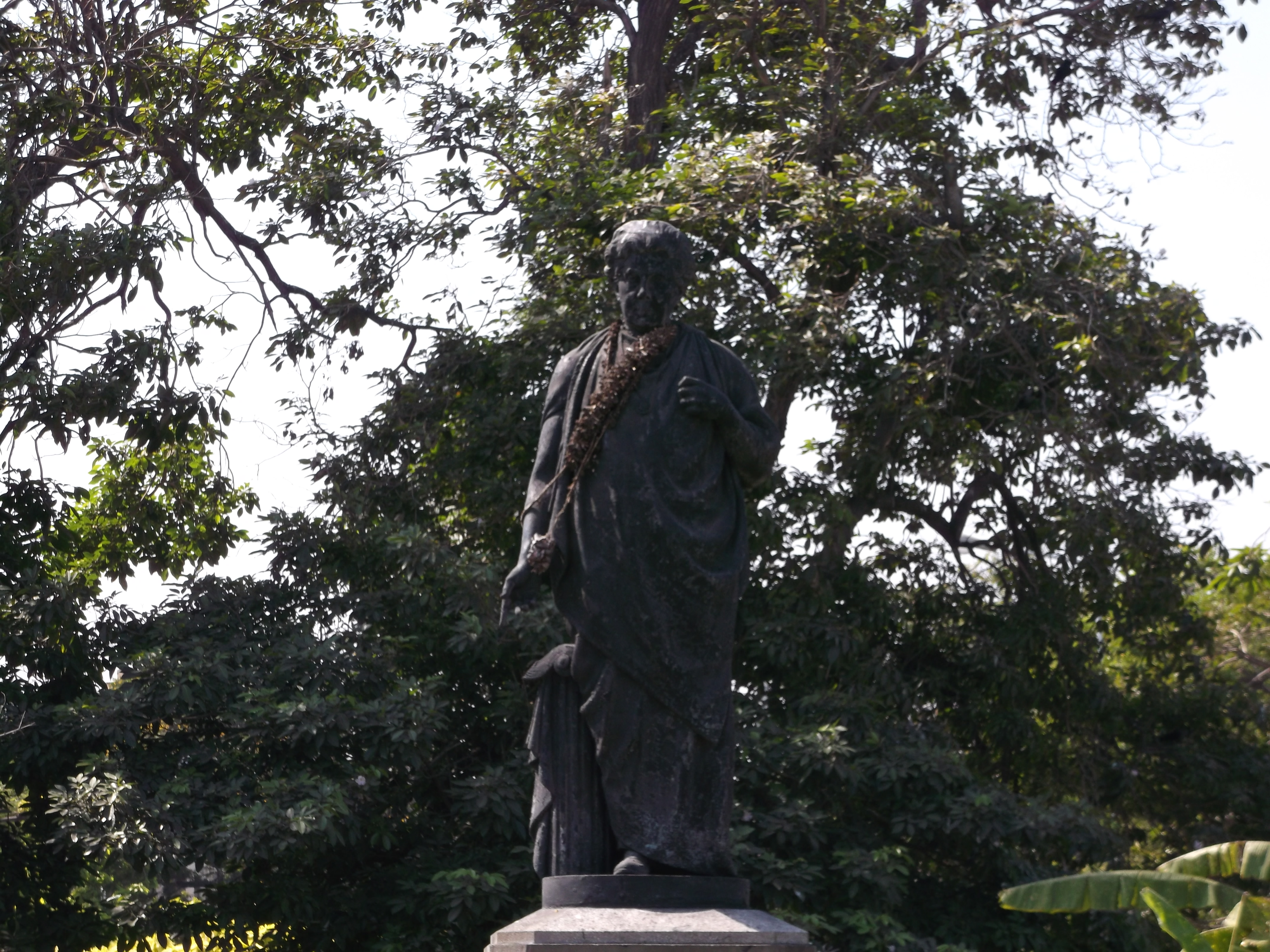
Annie Besant statue

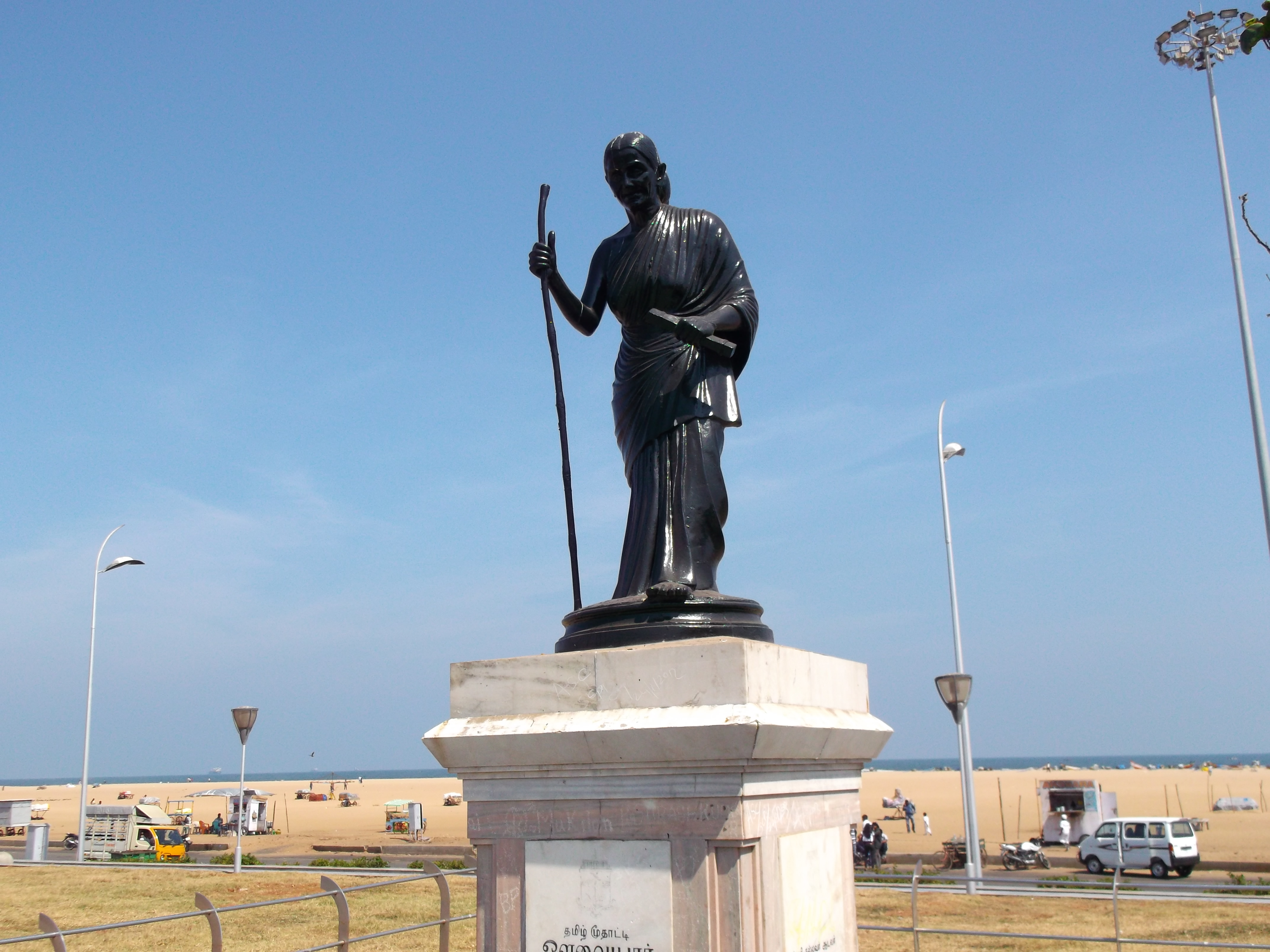
Avvaiyaar statue

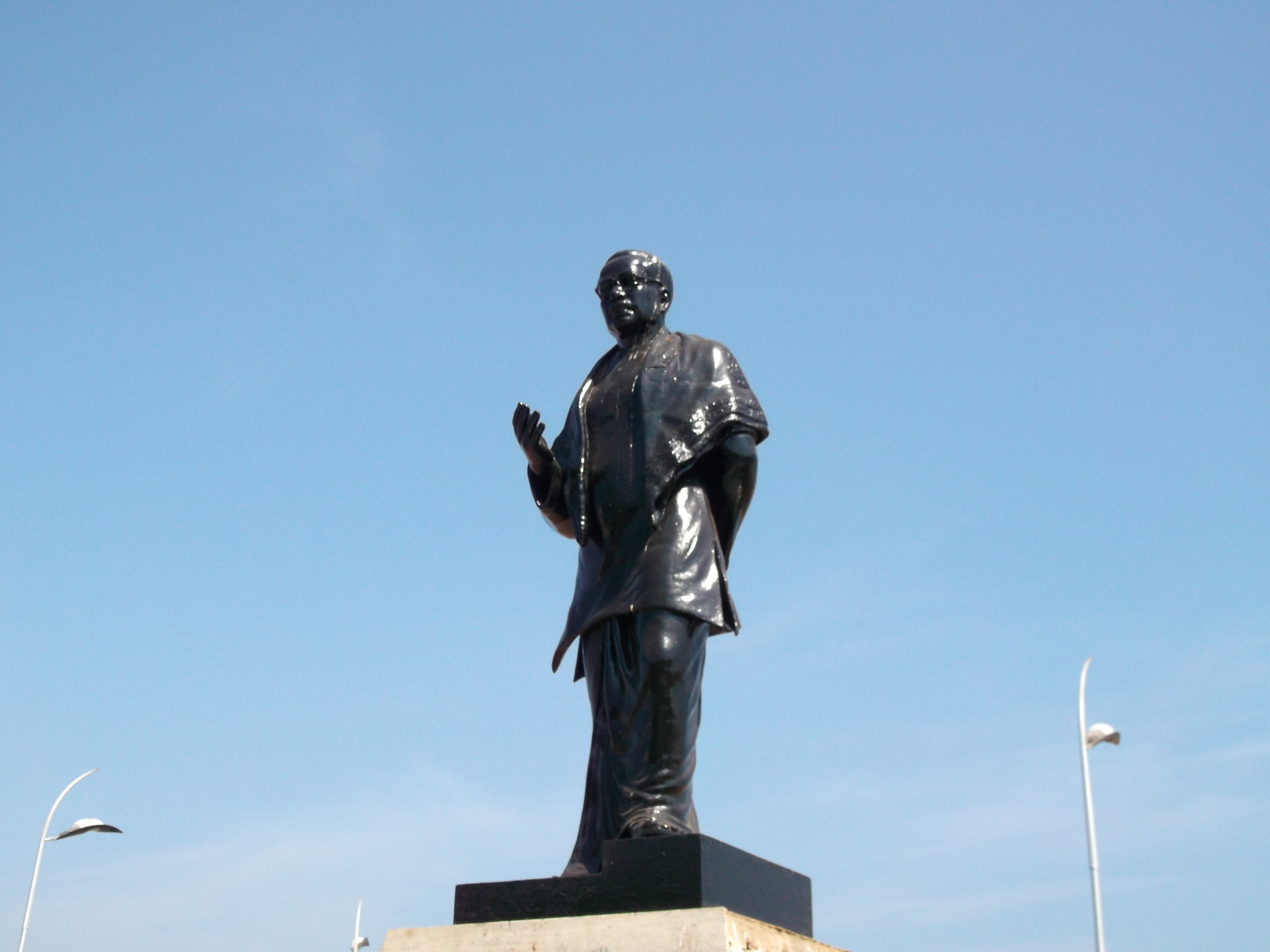
Barathidasan statue

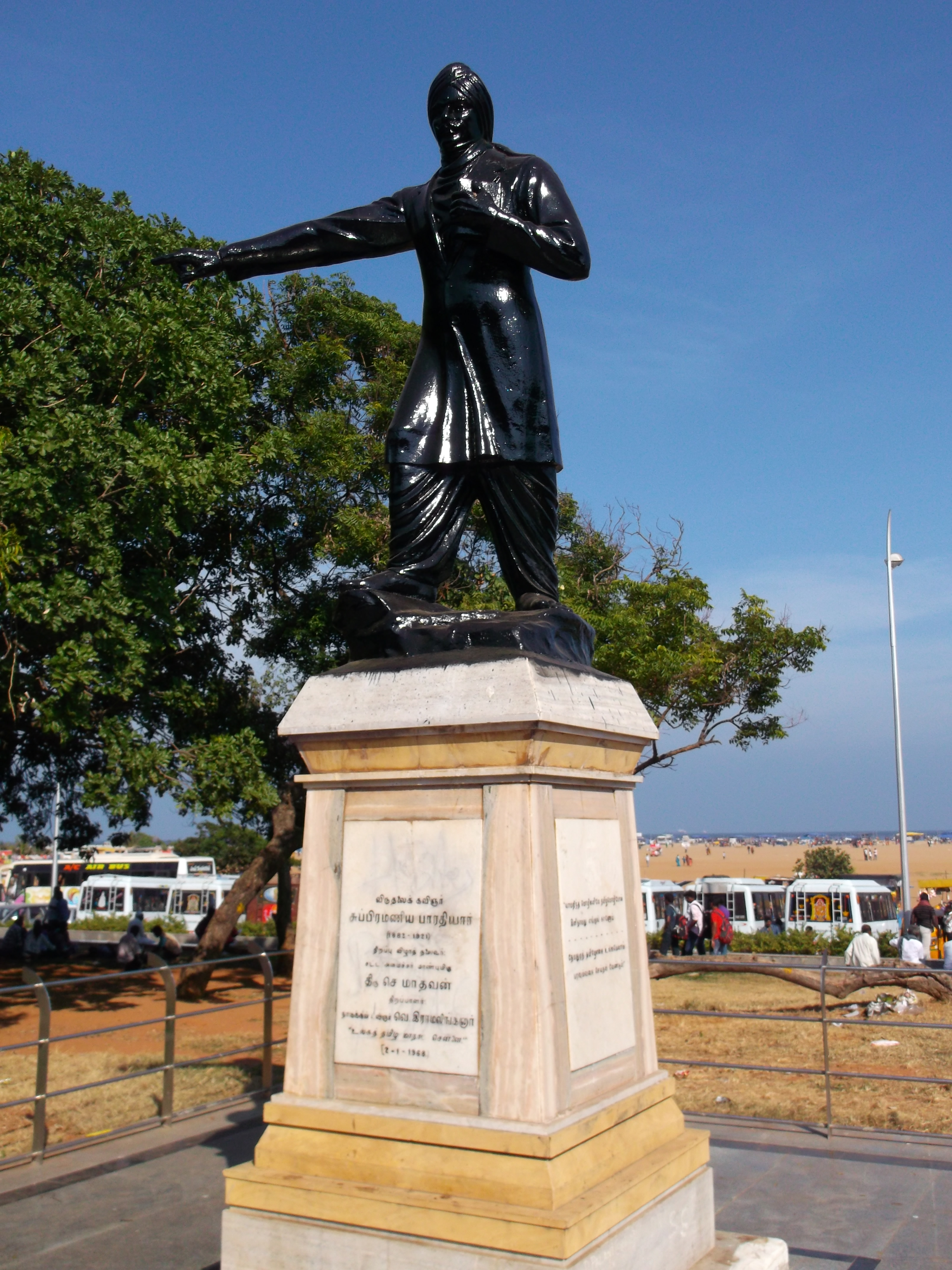
Bharathiyar statue

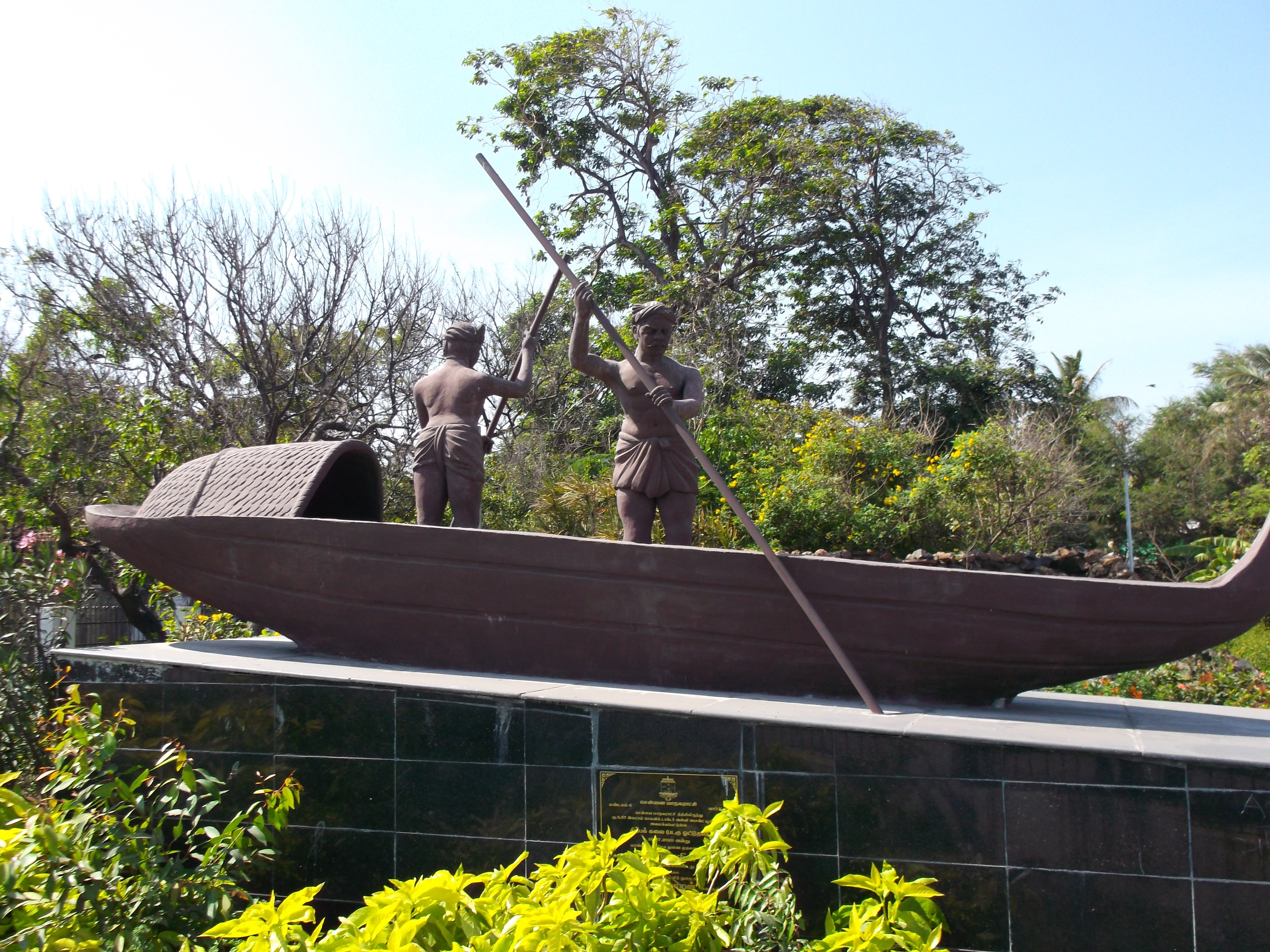
Fishermen at the Buckingham Canal statue

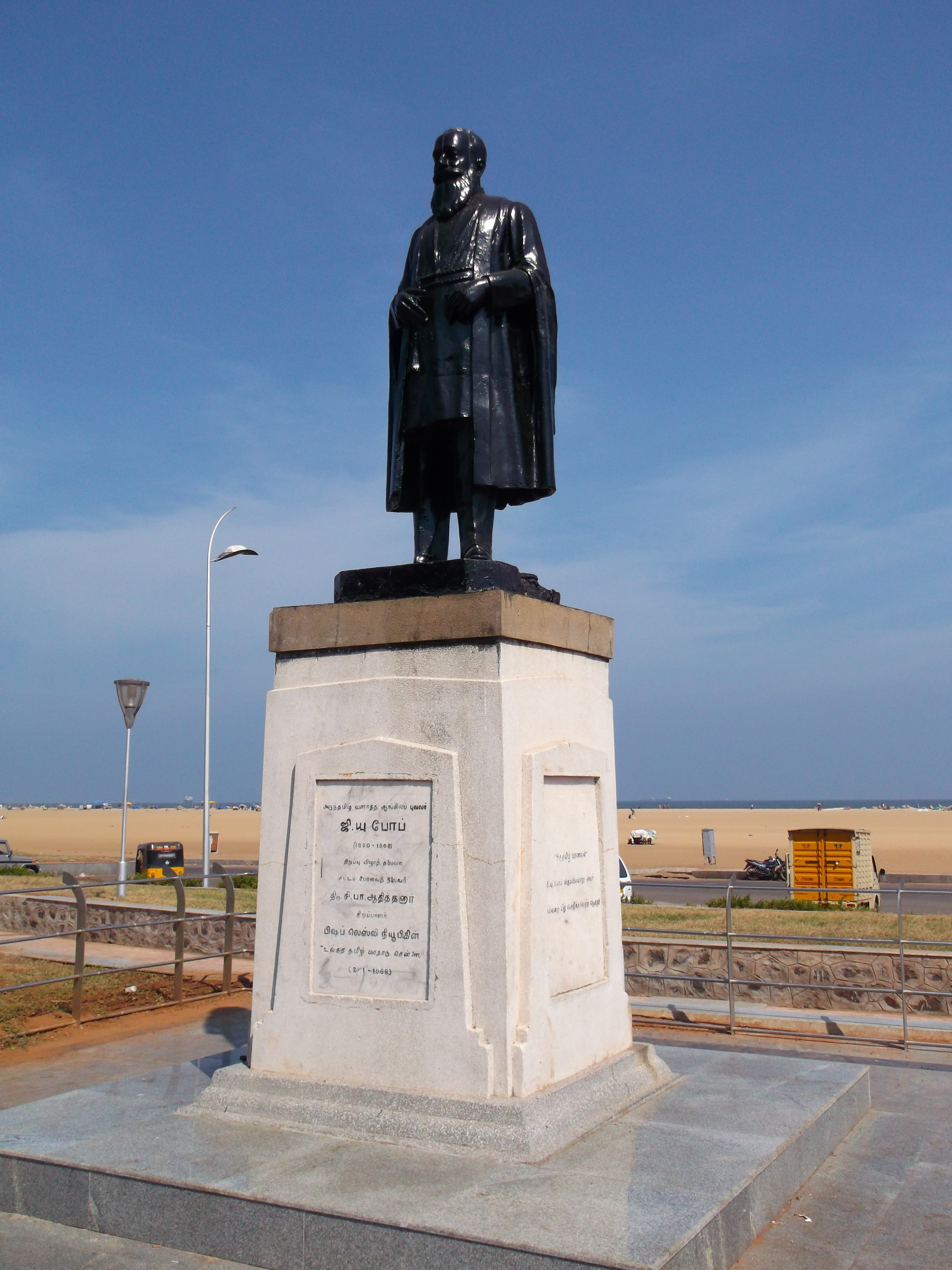
George Uglow Pope statue

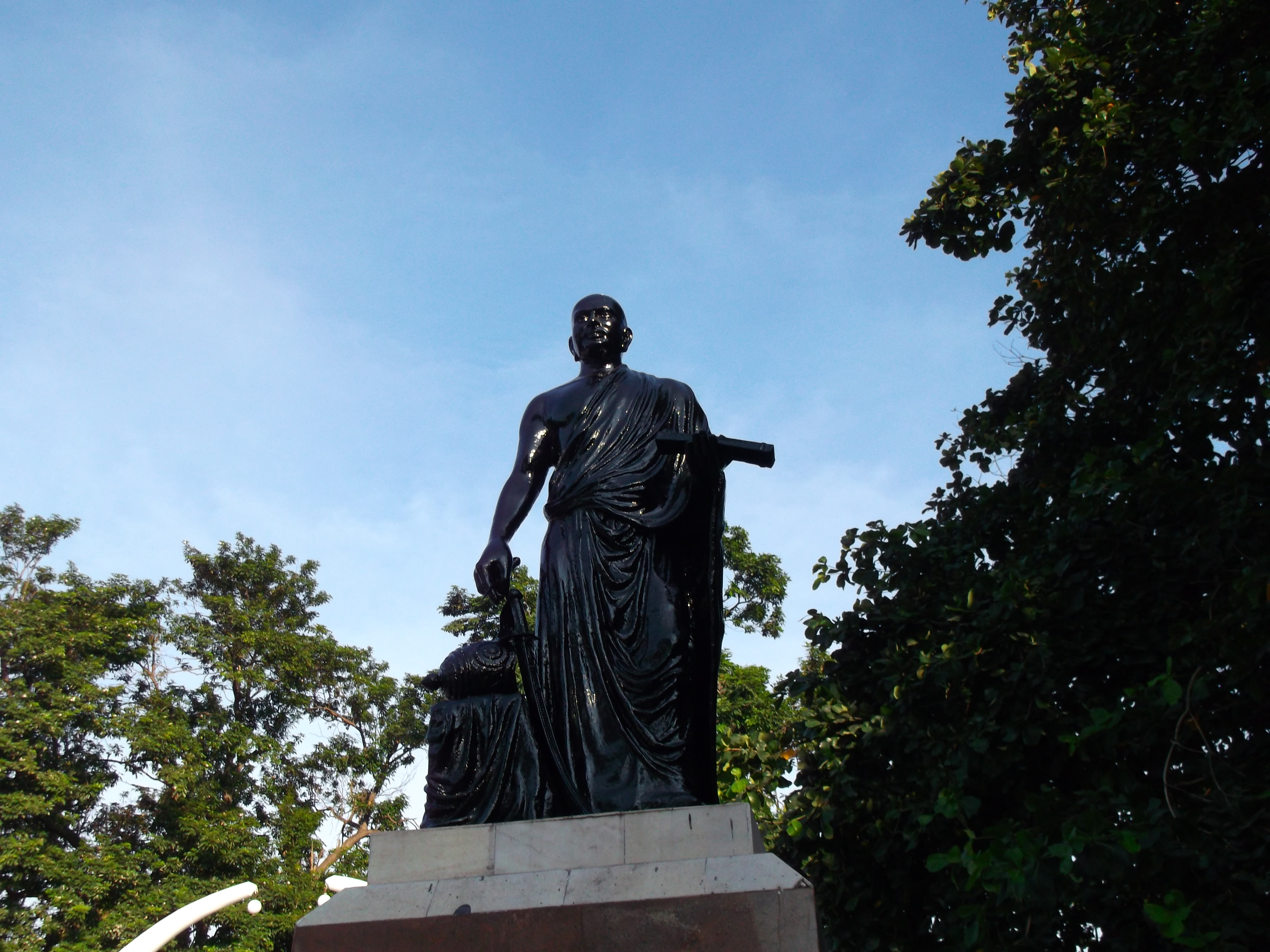
Ilangovadigal statue

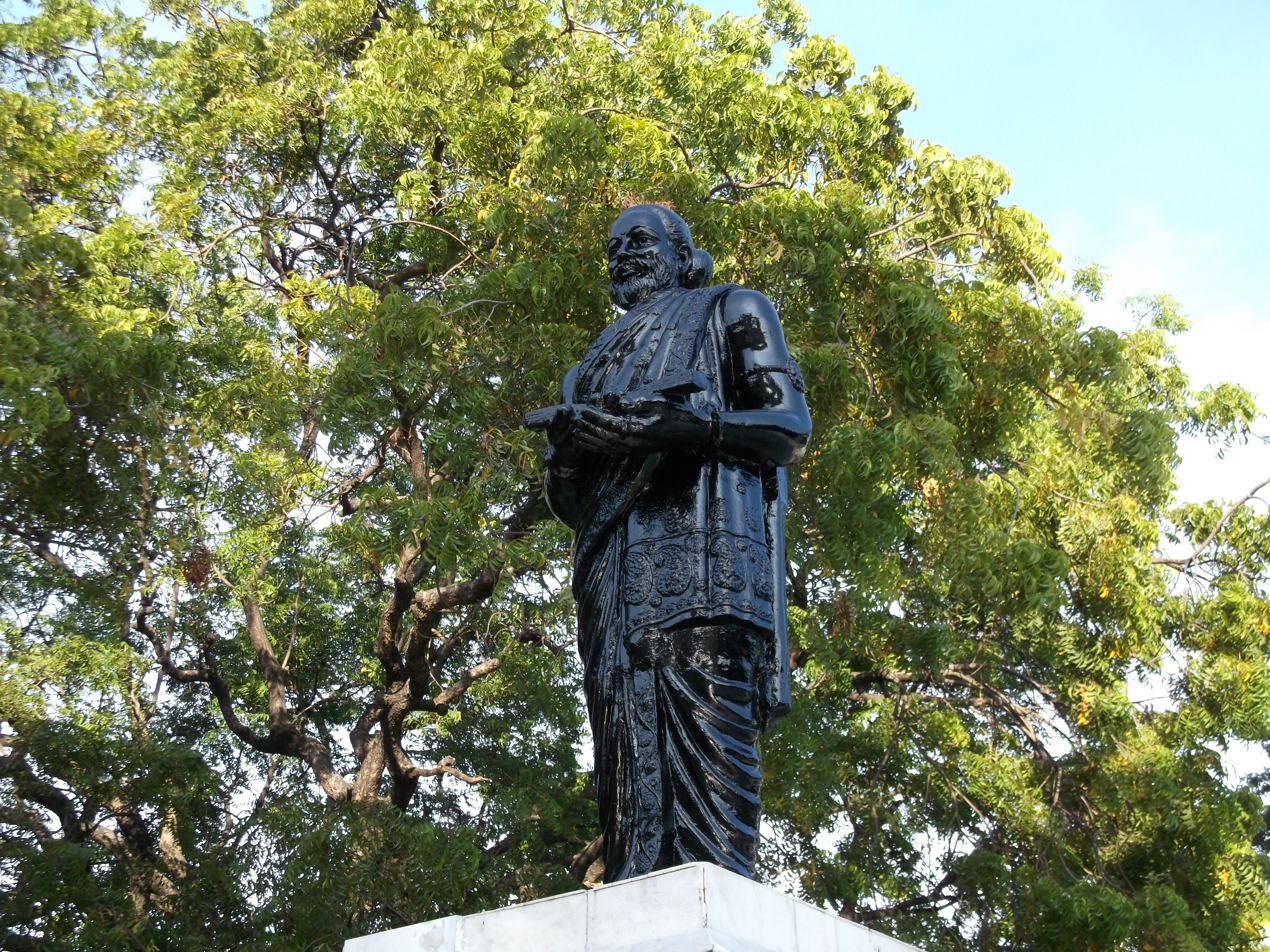
Kambar statue

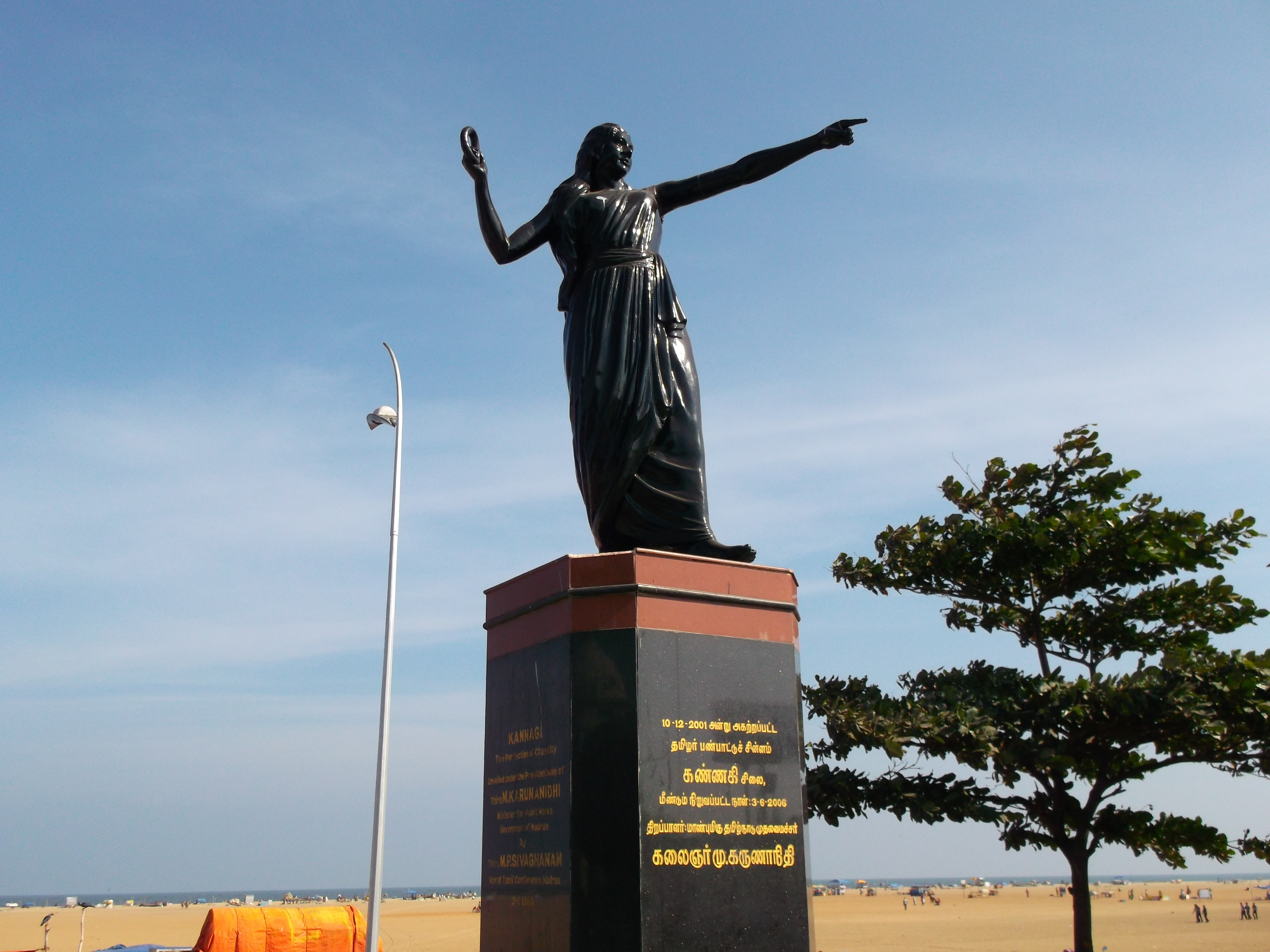
Kannagi statue

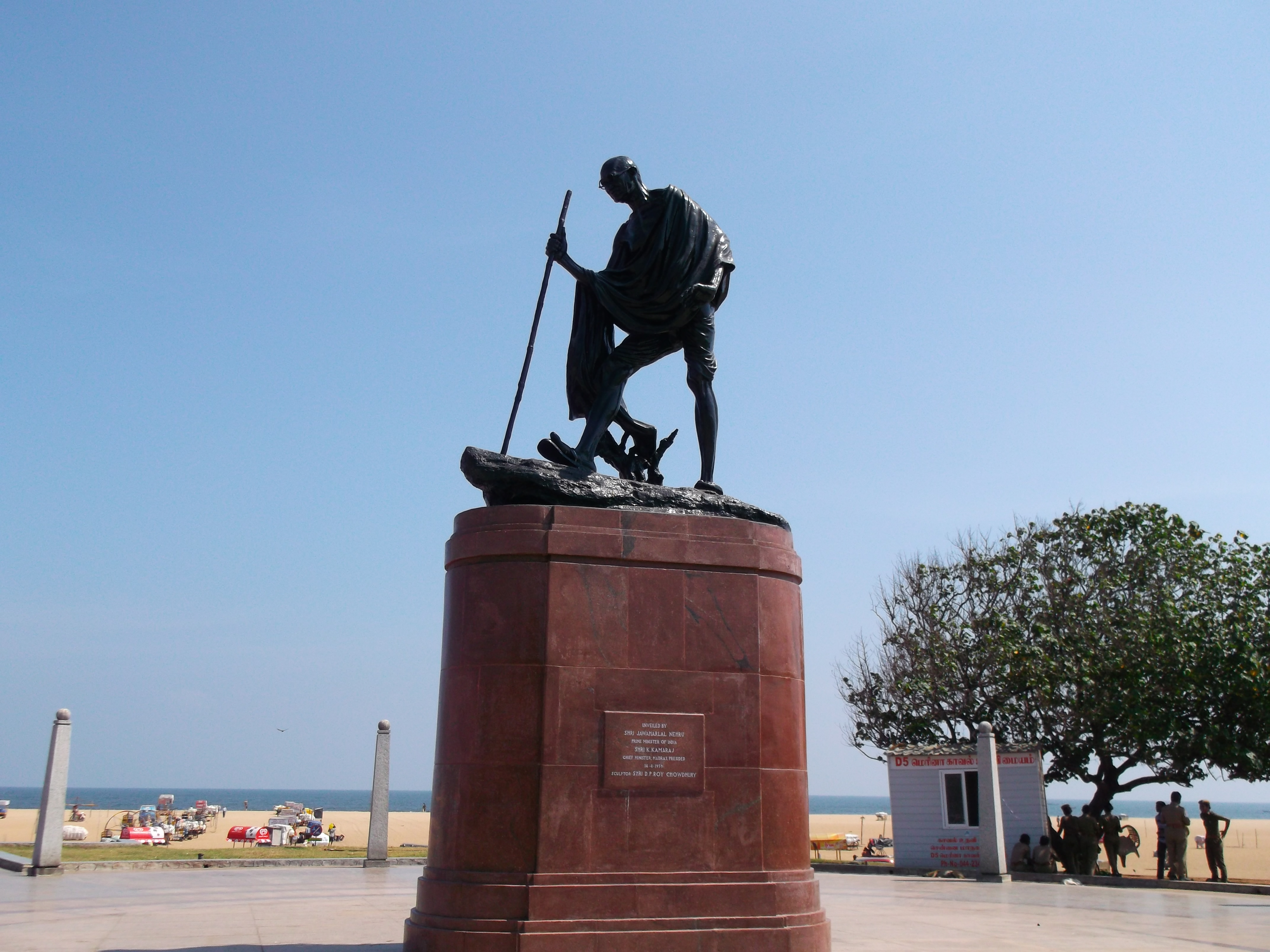
Mahatma Gandhi statue

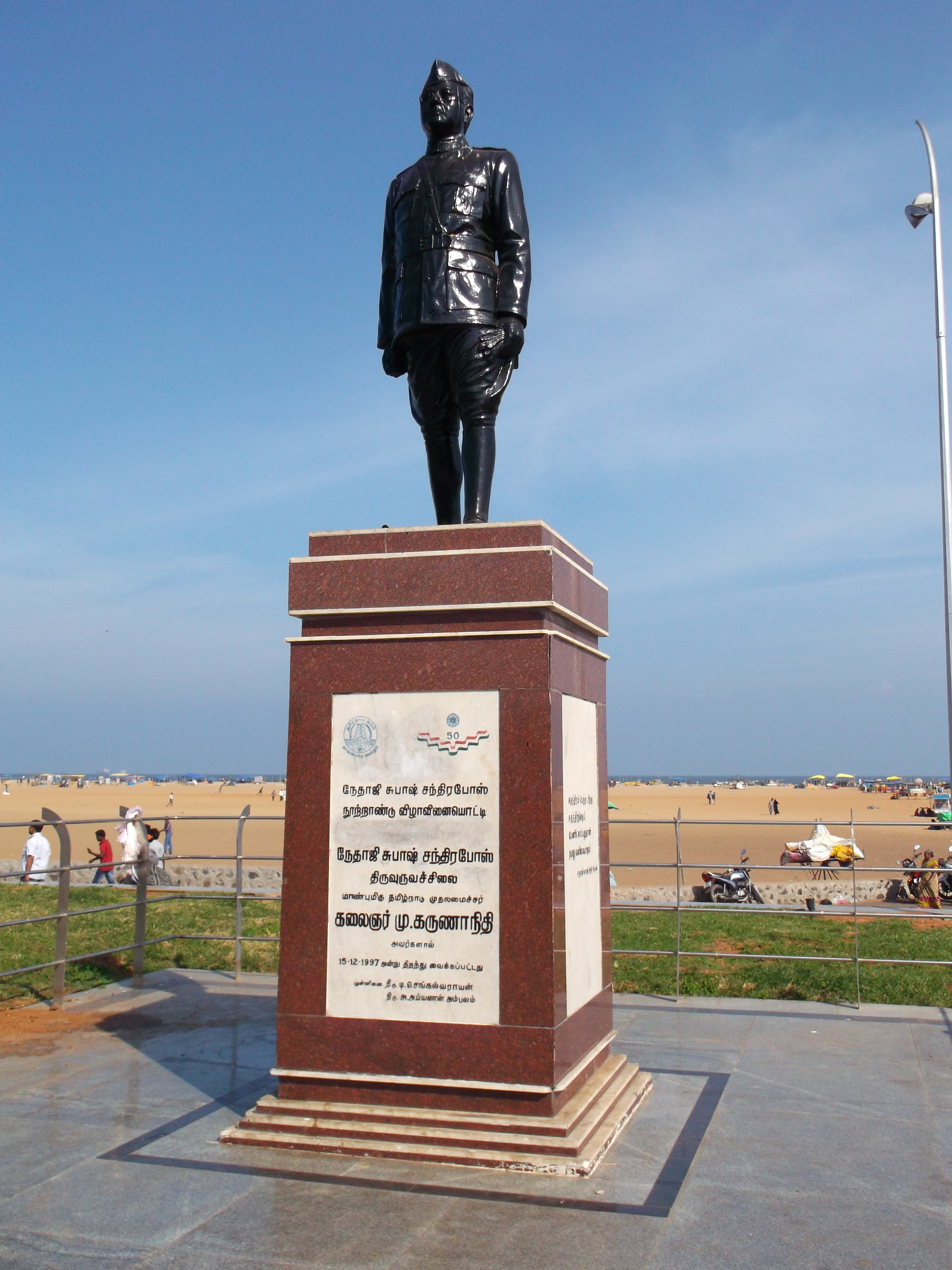
Subhas Chandra Bose statue

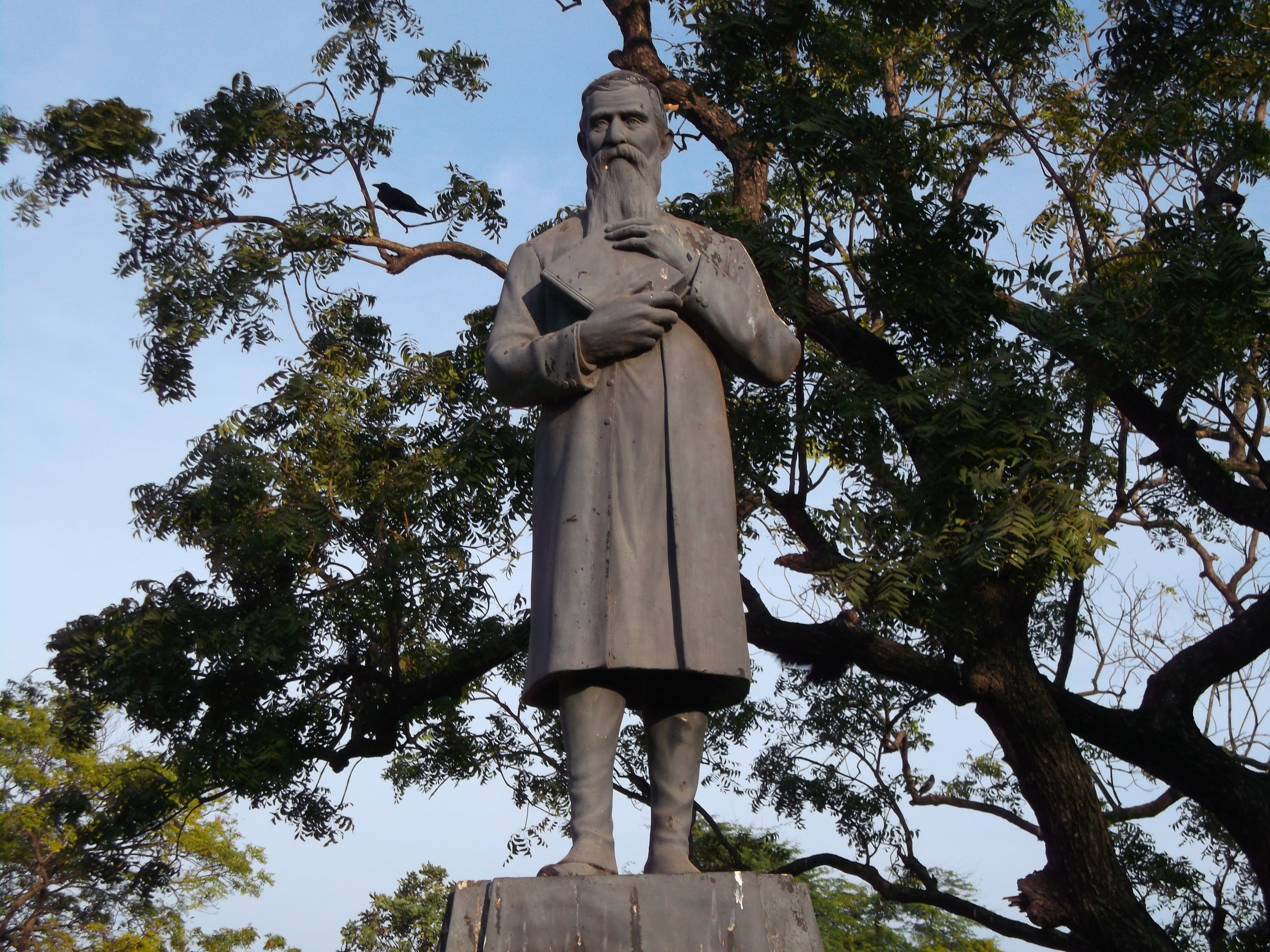
Robert Caldwell statue

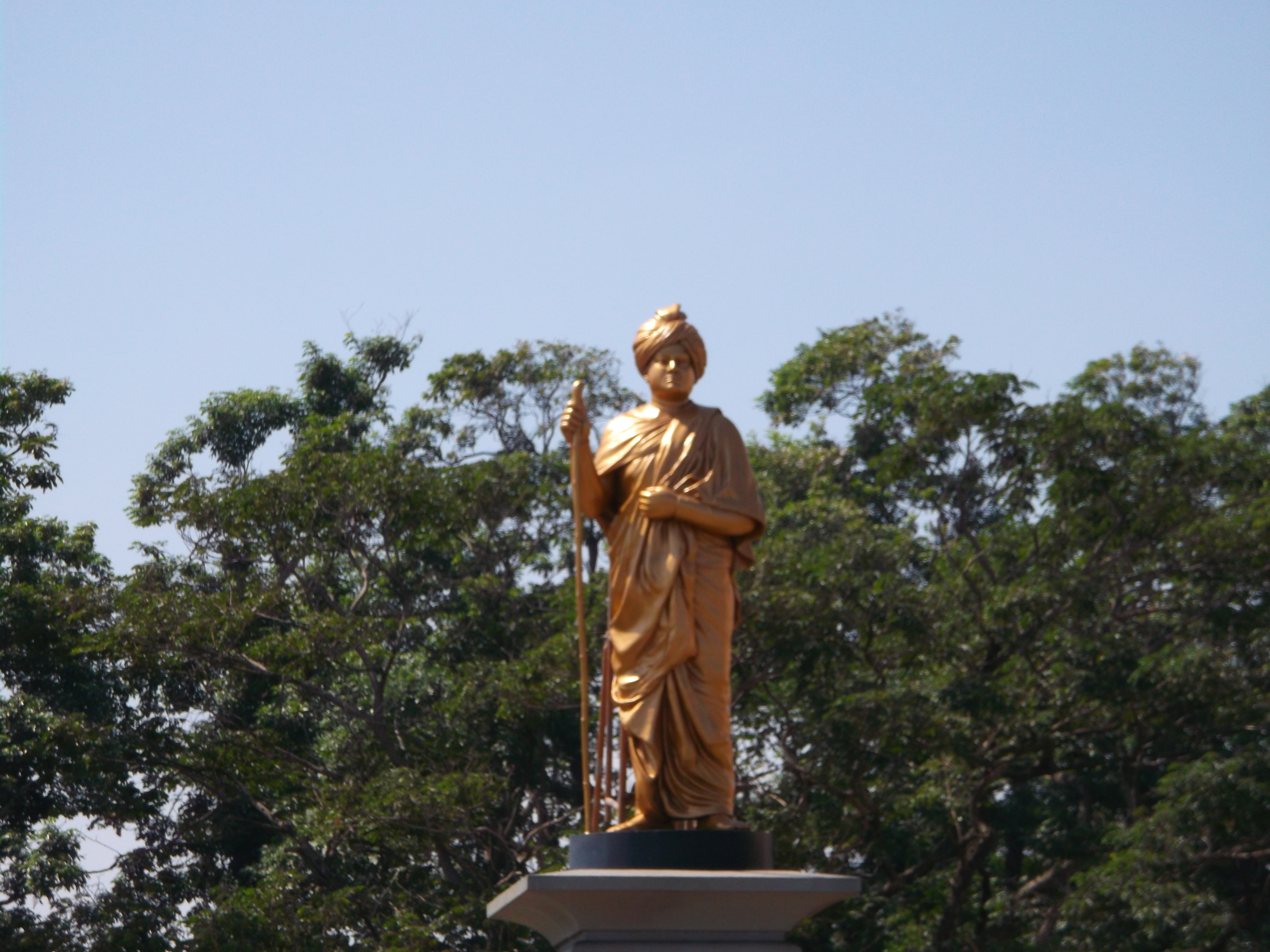
Vivekanandar statue

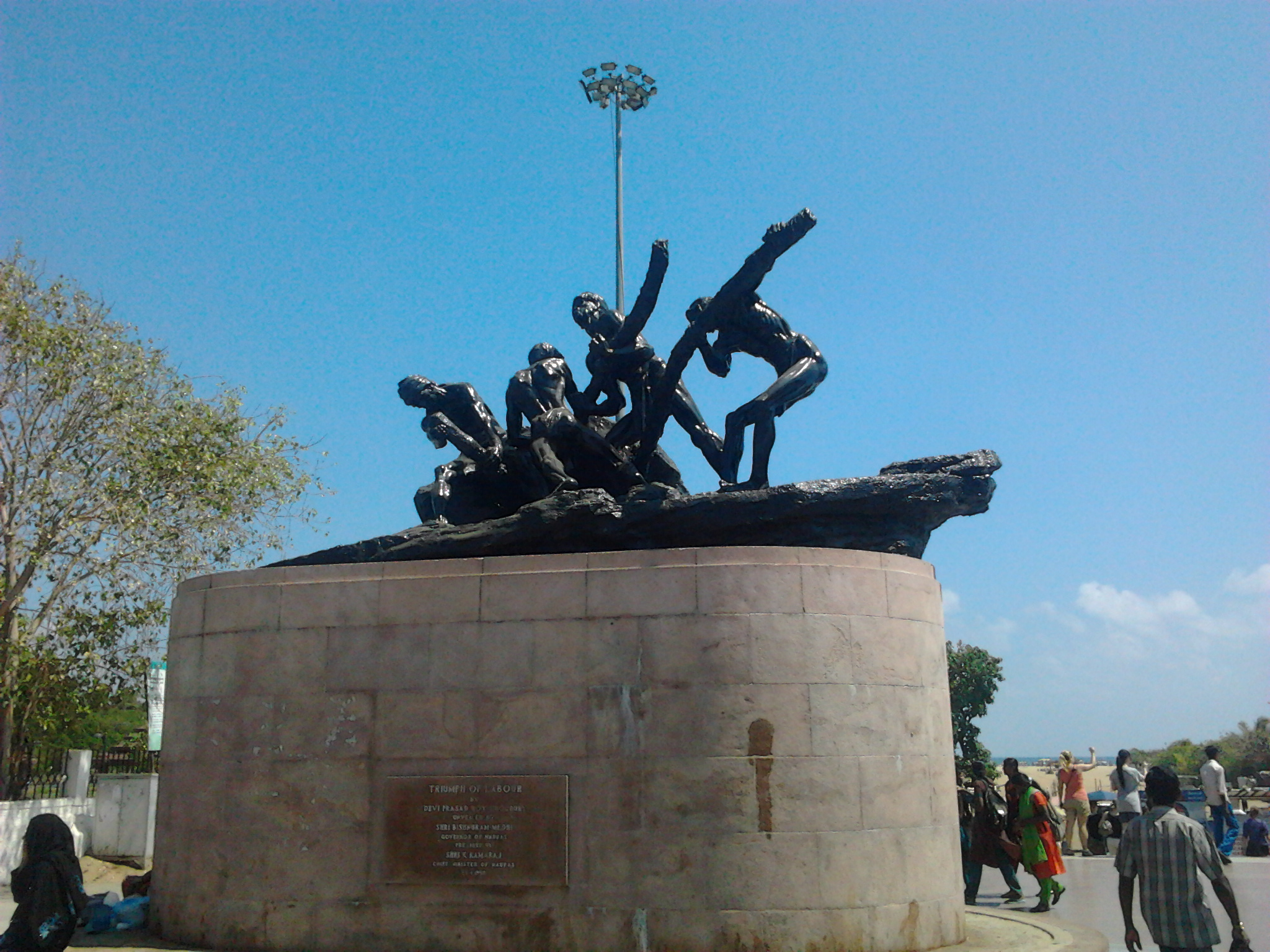
Triumph of Labour statue

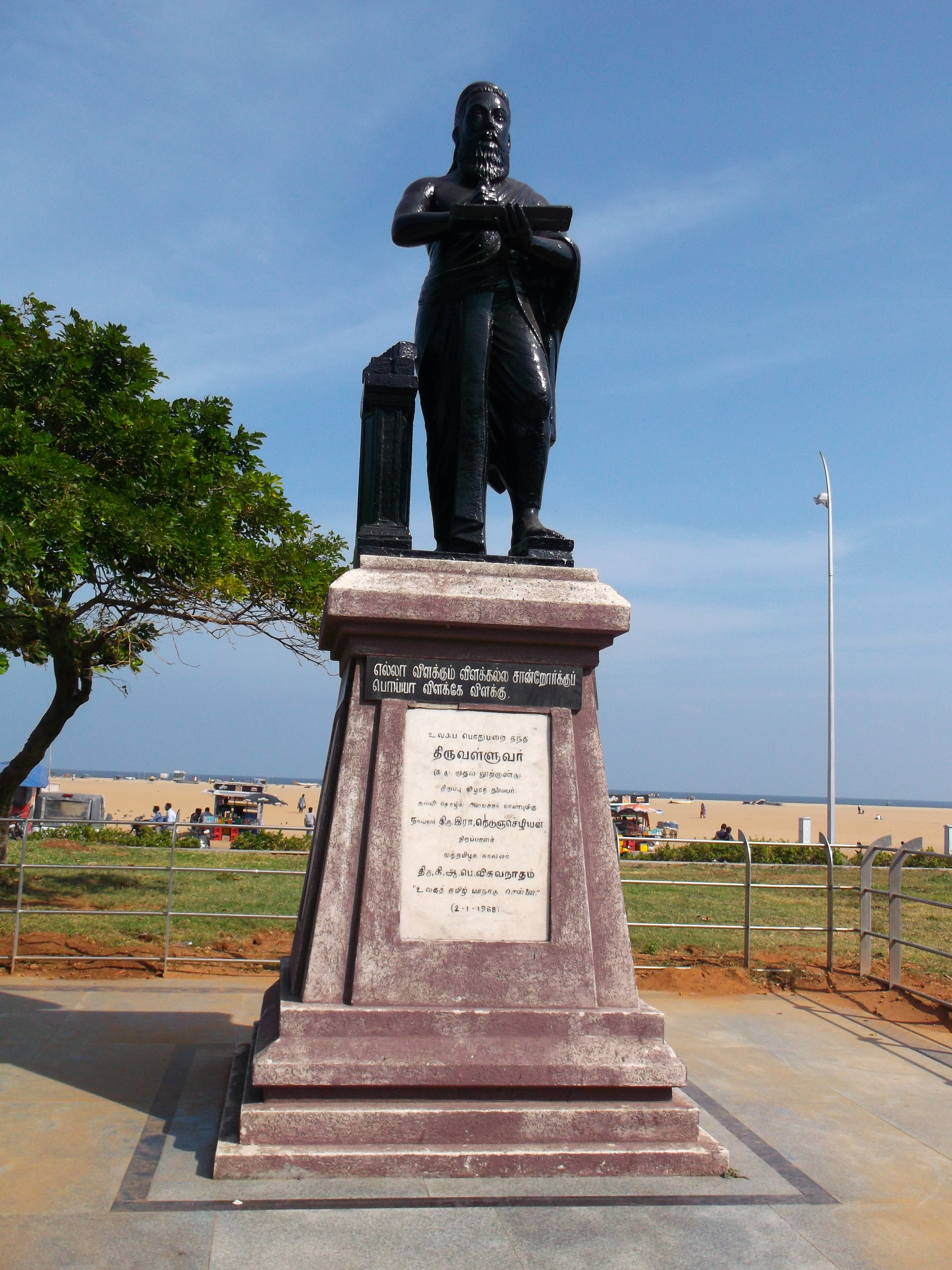
Thiruvalluvar statue

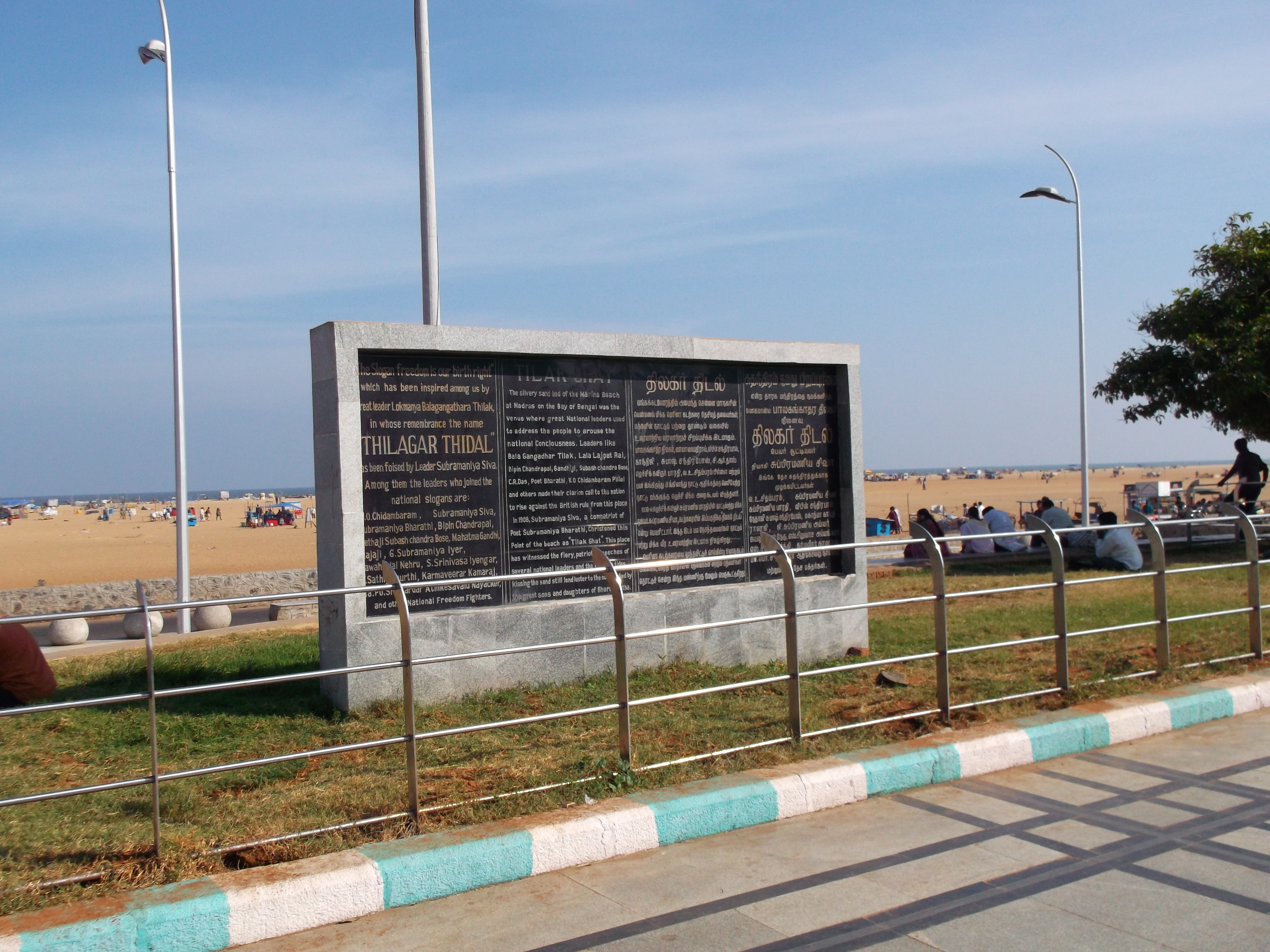
Thilagar Thidal plaque

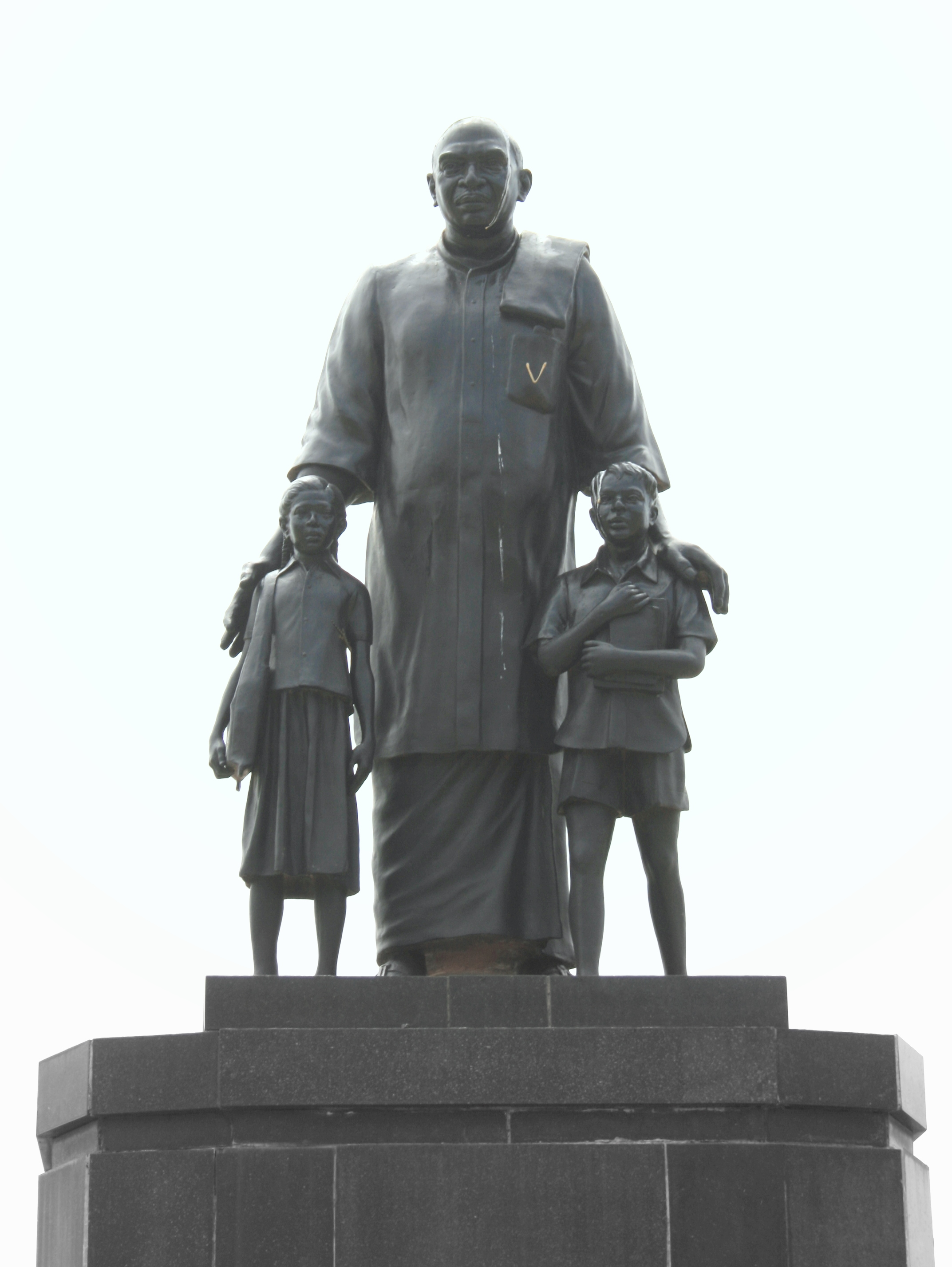
Kamaraj statue

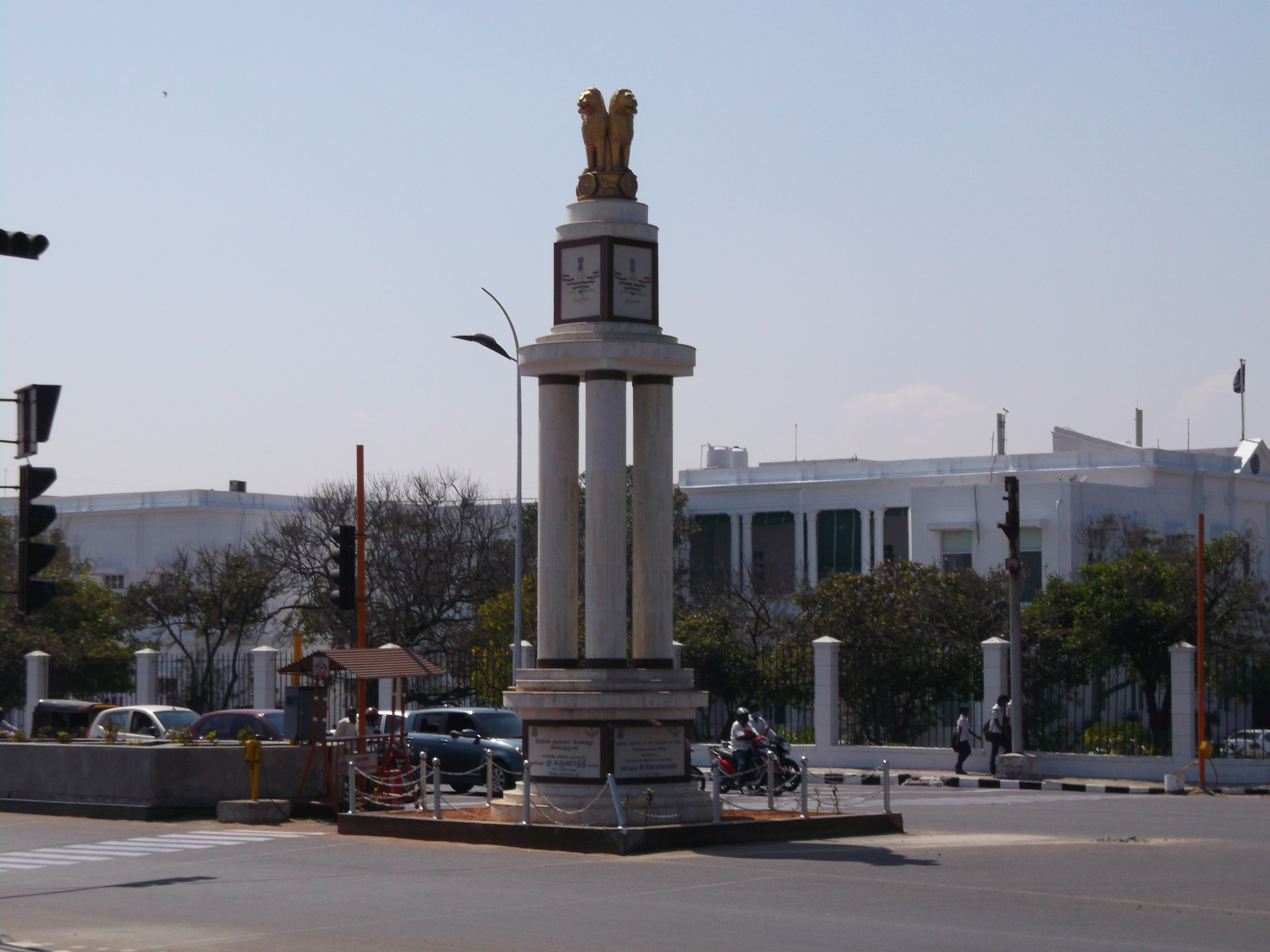
Golden Jubilee of Independence memorial pillar

Earlier present near Gandhi statue traffic island was a statue for Sivaji Ganesan, which was erected on 21 July 2006. Following a court order, it was shifted on 3 August 2017 to a newly built memorial at Adyar.

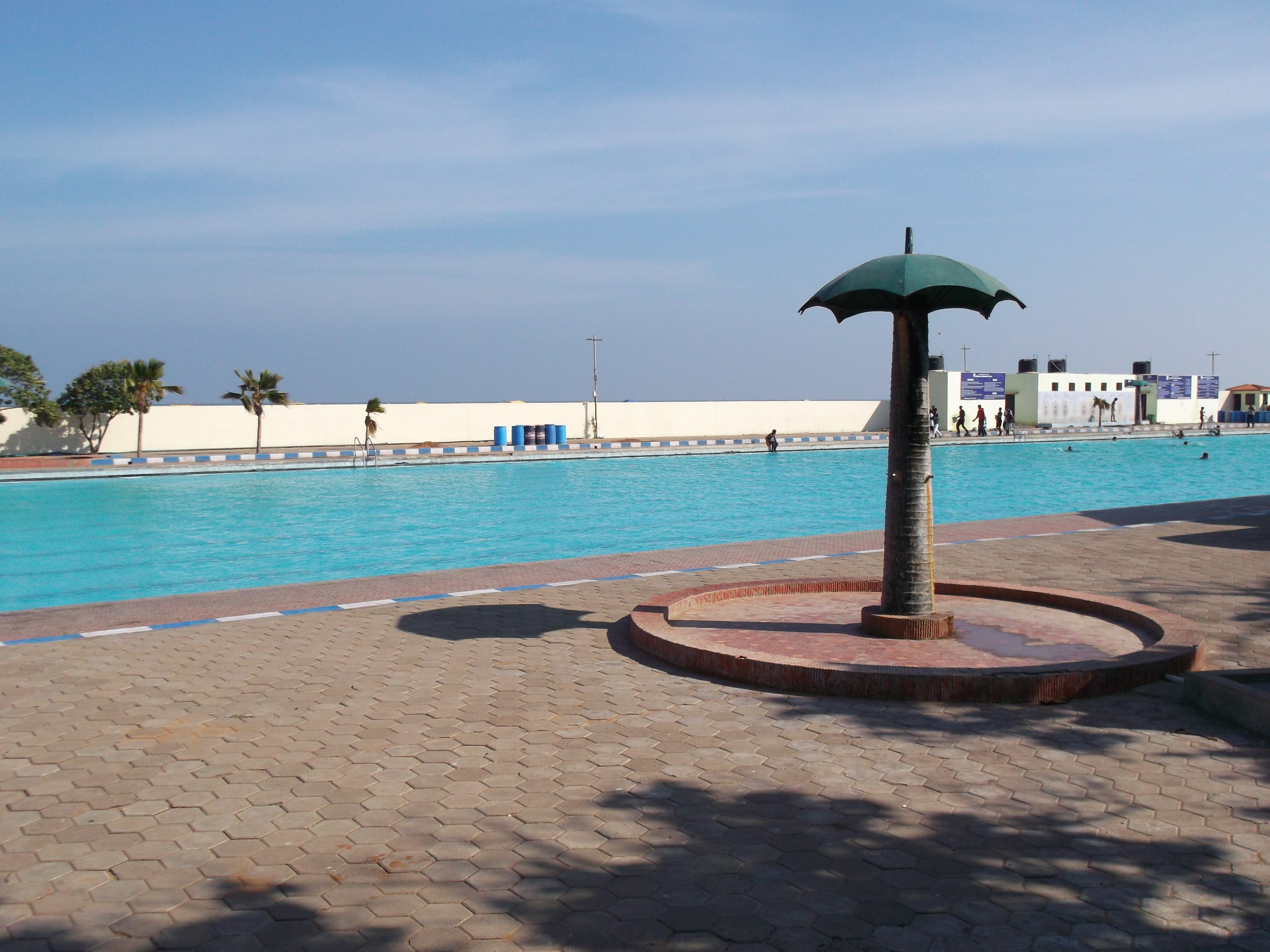
Marina Swimming Pool

The other side of the road houses several historical buildings and institutions including the Chepauk Cricket Stadium, the University of Madras, the Presidency College, Vivekananda House, Queen Mary's College, Inspector General of Police Headquarters, All India Radio—Chennai, Dr. Annie Besant Park.

== Renovation ==
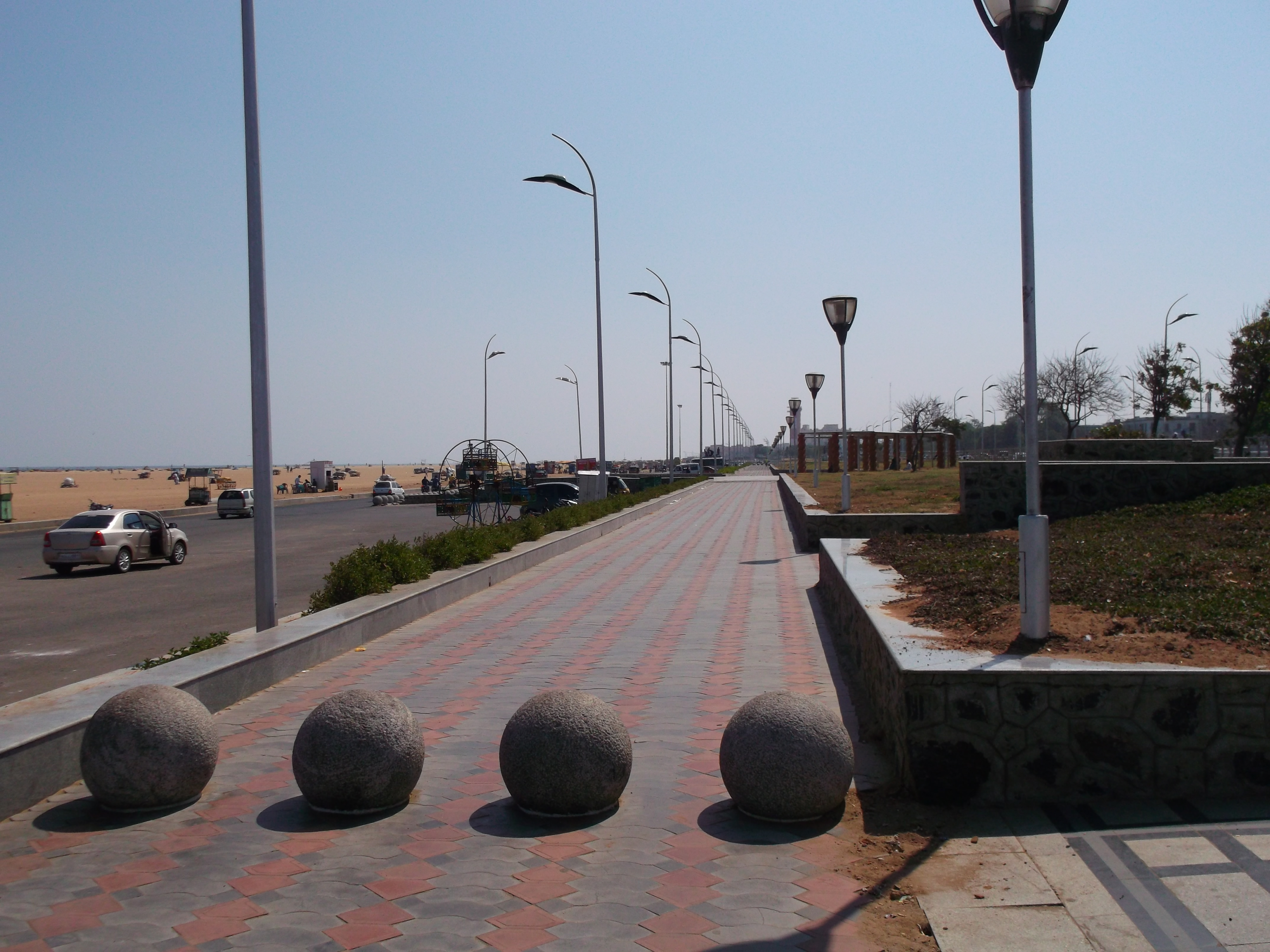
Promenade leading to the lighthouse

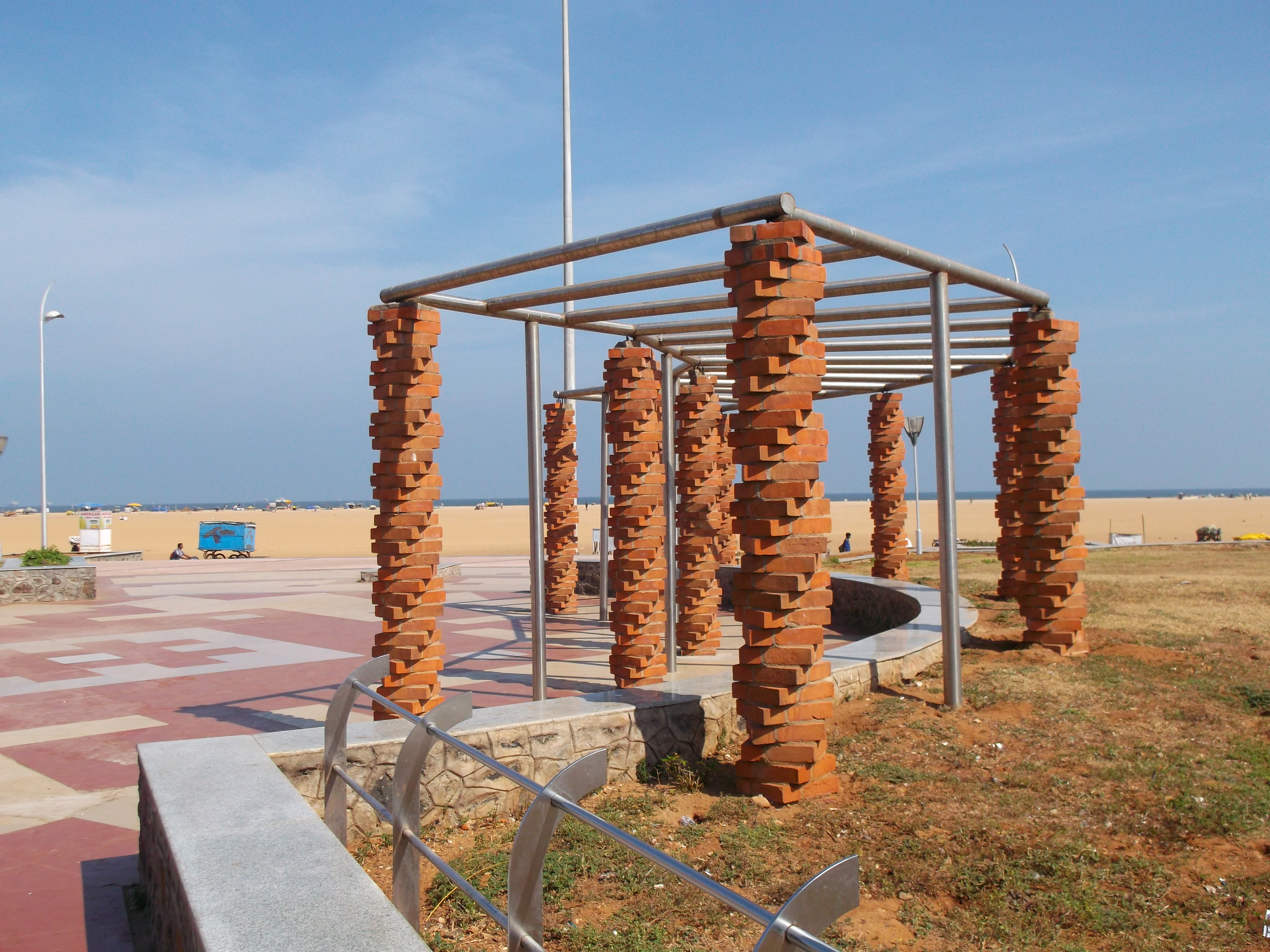
One of the several decorative installations at the beach

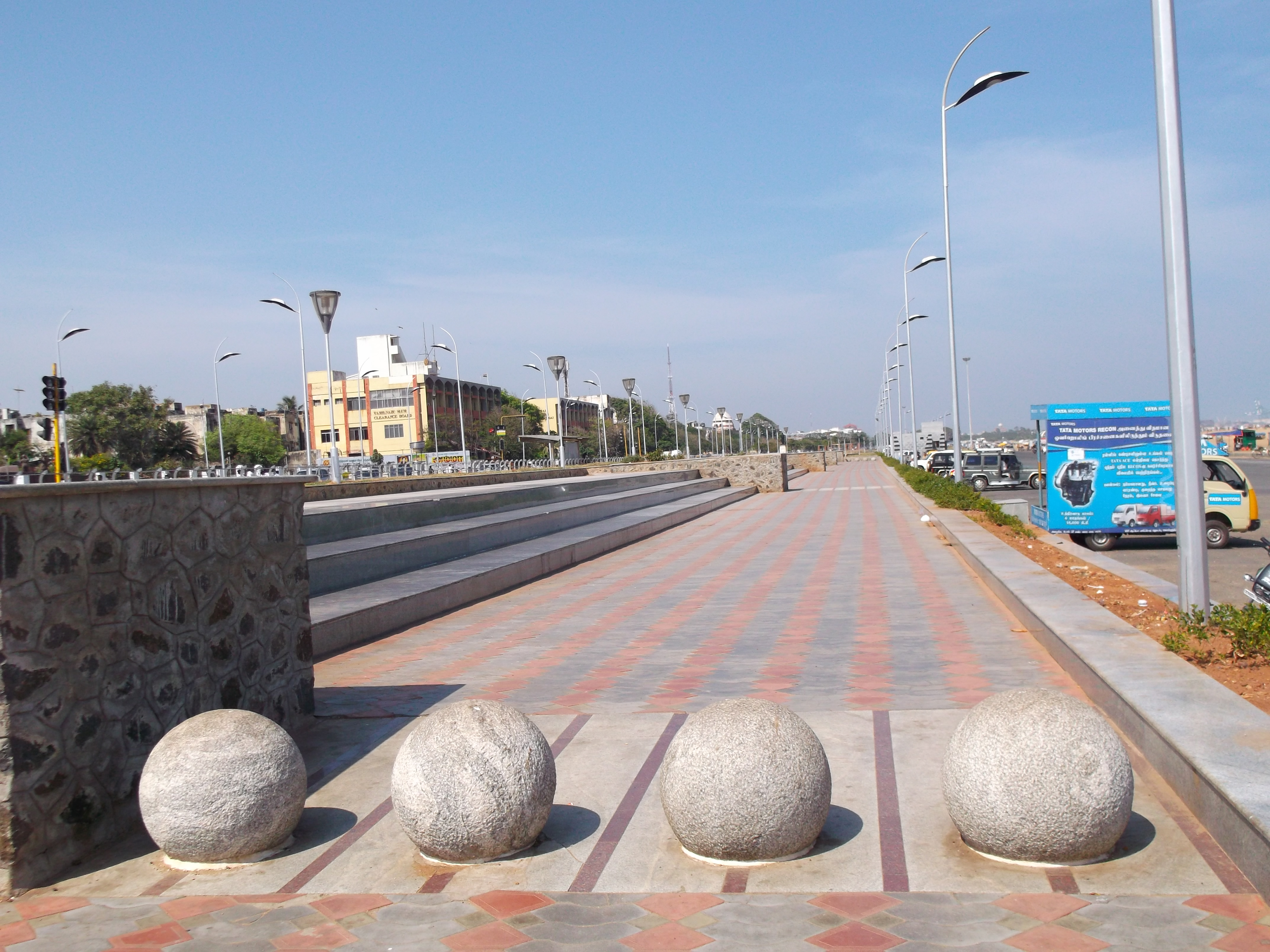
The beach has 14 landscaped galleries

In February 2008, the Chennai Corporation, previously known as The Madras Corporation, took up the Marina Renovation Project with improved landscaping, seating arrangements, walkways, and lighting along the promenade, and architectural elements such as plazas, gazeboes, and pergolas were installed all along the stretch including 4 m-wide non-slippery granite footpaths near the service lane, another 5 m-wide footpath, and 15 m-wide lawns. The blueprint of the renovation project included ornamental fountains, exclusive parking lots for two- and four-wheelers, a children's play area, bus shelters, ramps for physically challenged, and food courts. The whole length of the stretch from Triumph of Labor Statue to the Lighthouse measuring 3.1 km has been divided into 14 harmonious landscaped galleries dotting its span, each with an element of drama attached to the design in the form of small theatre-type galleries where visitors can sit.

All the 14 sections vary significantly from one another and were designed in such a way as to the differentiation of sections not leading to any break in the walkway, which is a continuous walking stretch from the Triumph of Labor Statue to the Kamaraj Statue. One of these galleries is flanked by two semi-circular stainless-steel pergolas resting on wire-cut brick columns. The galleries can accommodate over 1,000 people. The choice of natural stones and pillars used in each section of the promenade was based on the type of the buildings on the other side of the road. The walkway was designed as low-lying as is necessary to have a clear view of the beach from the road. A total of 428 octagonal poles with seagull-shaped light fittings and additional high-mast lamps have been erected.

Ten modern stainless steel bus shelters have been erected near the beach. There is a skating rink behind the Gandhi Statue which has been improved with hand rails and tiles on the periphery under the project. A total of 14 galleries with seating arrangements and a 4-m internal walkway along the sands and fountains have been created on the 3.1-kilometre (1.9 mi) stretch from the Anna Square to the Lighthouse. This stretch has uninterrupted pavement and a sub-road parallel to the main road. Five reverse osmosis plants capable of providing 30,000 liters of drinking water an hour free of cost to visitors is under construction. As part of the beautification project, the decade-old 250-watt lamps were replaced with 690 anti-corrosive lamps along Kamaraj Salai and the service road. The renovation was completed in December 2009 at a cost of ₹ 259.2 million. Although initially the corporation planned to outsource security personnel to protect the renovated structures, the plan was dropped and about 50 corporation staff were employed to man the stretch.

In 2009, a 4.5-km-long stretch along the beach was announced plastic-free zone, prohibiting the sale and use of plastic. In November 2010, the corporation imposed a fine of ₹ 100 on the usage of plastic items that are less than 20 μm thick on the entire stretch. Within a couple of years since the ban, the use of plastics on the beach was reduced by 70 percent.

In 2012, the government allotted ₹ 89 million for the renovation of the memorials of Anna and M.G.R. This include ₹ 12 million and ₹ 43 million towards renovation of Anna Memorial and M.G.R. and Amma Memorial, respectively, ₹ 34 million towards additional construction at the M.G.R. and Amma Memorial.

In 2012, the corporation allotted ₹ 48.4 million for installing two high-mast lamps, a police watchtower, and a giant chess board and an interactive fountain in the children's play area. This also includes relocation of the shops to specific locations on the sand at a cost of ₹ 41.2 million.

In 2017, plans to revamp the beach under the Swadesh Darshan scheme of the Indian government at a cost of ₹ 500 million have been drawn.

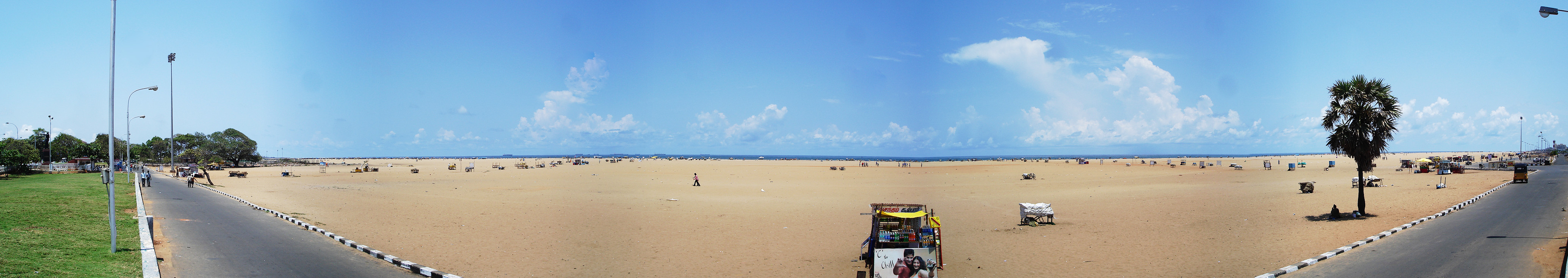
Panoramic view stretch of the sandy Marina beach

== Safety measures and policing ==
The Marina continues to remain the most dangerous place to bathe or swim, recording the highest number of drownings in the state of Tamil Nadu. Bathing and swimming are illegal at Marina beach since the undercurrent in the region is very strong, and there are no lifeguards stationed here. As many people throng the beach, quite often there are drowning mishaps. An estimated five sea-bathers are drowned every month at the beach, and most of the swimmers are dragged by the tides into the debris of a tramp ship SS Damatis that sank off the beach during a cyclone in 1966. Police personnel and lifeguards constantly patrol the whole area, which is divided into seventy-two sections, by means of horses and all-terrain vehicles (known as beach buggies). Five spots off the beach, including near the Anna Square, Kannagi Statue, Triumph of Labor Statue and behind Vivekananda House, have been identified by the police as extremely unsafe due to the presence of whirlpools and rock projections in the seabed. In 2010, 75 people drowned in the sea along the 5-km stretch of the beach. Of this, the 1-km stretch from Anna Square to the Anna swimming pool is considered the most dangerous with as many as 29 persons drowning in the sea in 2010. The deep sea in this stretch is considered to still hold parts of the smacked ship. In 2011, in addition to the tie-up with Coast Guard security personnel, the city police planned for a tie-up with the fire and rescue services department to provide a stand-by rescue team at the beach to save people from drowning. The rescue team, equipped with a rubber boat and a motor-fitted boat, was planned to be stationed at the Anna Square police station or the Marina police station.

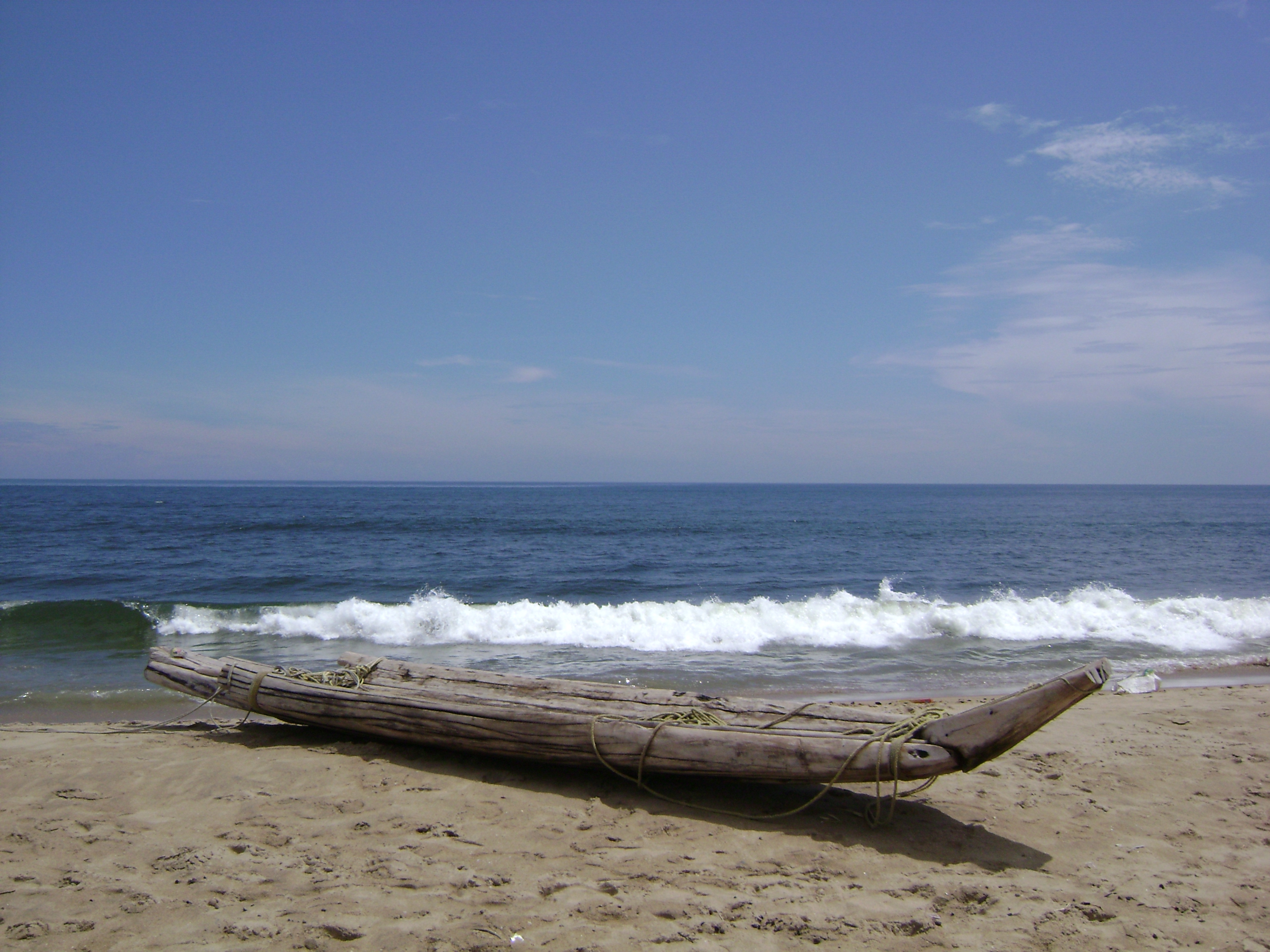
A catamaran on the beach

The law-enforcing agencies is planning to bring the beach under close watch by means of two watchtowers and at least a dozen surveillance cameras. The Chennai Corporation has agreed in principle to create the security infrastructure based on a proposal sent by the Greater Chennai Police. The watchtowers are proposed to be erected behind the Triumph of Labour statue and the Gandhi statue. In August 2012, the government sanctioned six more all-terrain vehicles for patrolling the beach.

In December 2012, in a measure to regulate parking and to control the entry of vehicles into the beach, the Chennai Corporation decided to install drop gates at seven entry points on the beach's service lane, including near the PWD Building, Subash Chandra Bose statue, Dr. Annie Besant statue, Vivekanandar Illam, Avvaiyar statue, Veeramamunivar statue and the lighthouse.

Despite intensive patrolling, illegal bike races and night races are also held along the stretch, resulting in public nuisances and, at times, death of the racers.

== Controversies ==
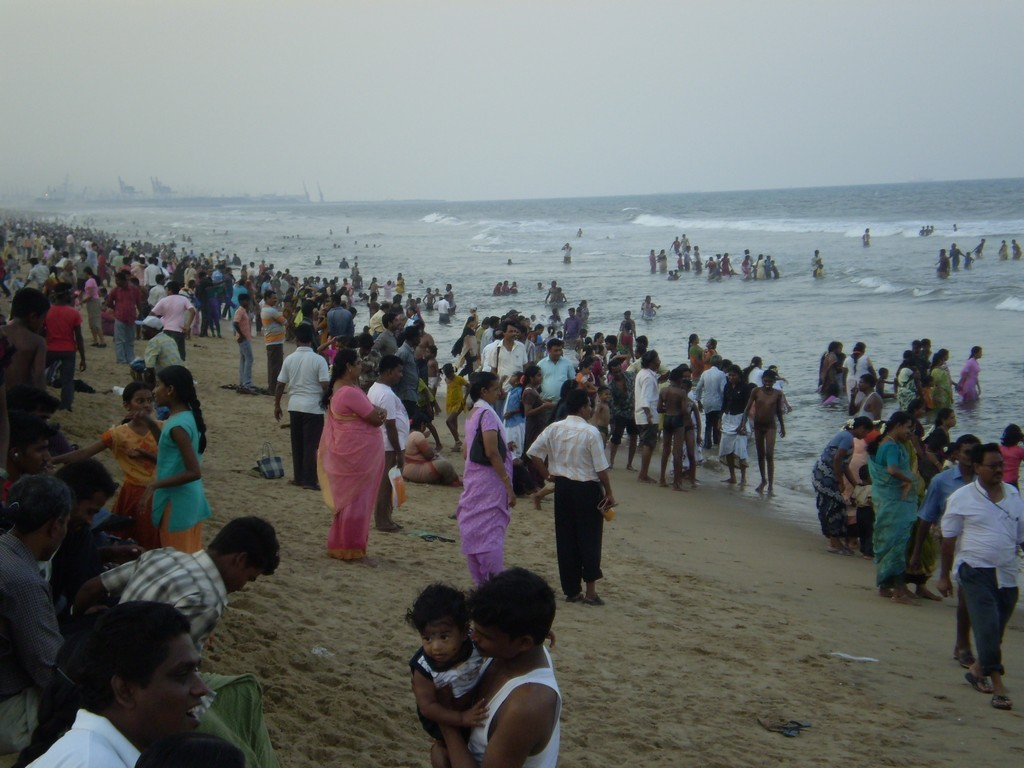
Crowd at the beach in the evening

With a length of 13 km, including a 6 km promenade, the Marina is claimed to be the world's second longest urban beach, although there exist in fact several longer beaches, including Praia do Cassino (254 km) in Brazil, Cox's Bazar (120 km) in Bangladesh, Padre Island on the U.S. Gulf Coast, Ninety Mile Beach in Australia and Ninety Mile Beach (88 km) in New Zealand. However, unlike most beaches, Marina is a natural sandy urban beach similar to the Copacabana beach in Rio de Janeiro, helping it earn the title.

In December 2001, the Kannagi statue, which was erected in 1968 on the occasion of a World Tamil Conference held in Chennai, was removed for traffic maintenance reason as part of modernization of the beach, which led to a huge protest and demonstration by the opposition Dravida Munnetra Kazhagam (DMK) party. When the DMK later came to power, the statue was installed in the same place on 3 June 2006 by the DMK party chief M. Karunanidhi.

On 9 August 2003, an open-air stage located 350 ft from the sea on the sands of the Marina called Seerani Arangam, constructed in 1970, which was used by religious groups and political parties to address gatherings, was demolished by the state government (ADMK) in order to modernise the beach. This spot was a place where rallies were held for the freedom movement during the British Raj, and the stage was considered a symbol of the historical events that had taken place in the Marina. This created a great controversy.

== Incidents ==
In 1966, a tramp ship SS Damatis sank near the Marina due to a cyclone in the region.

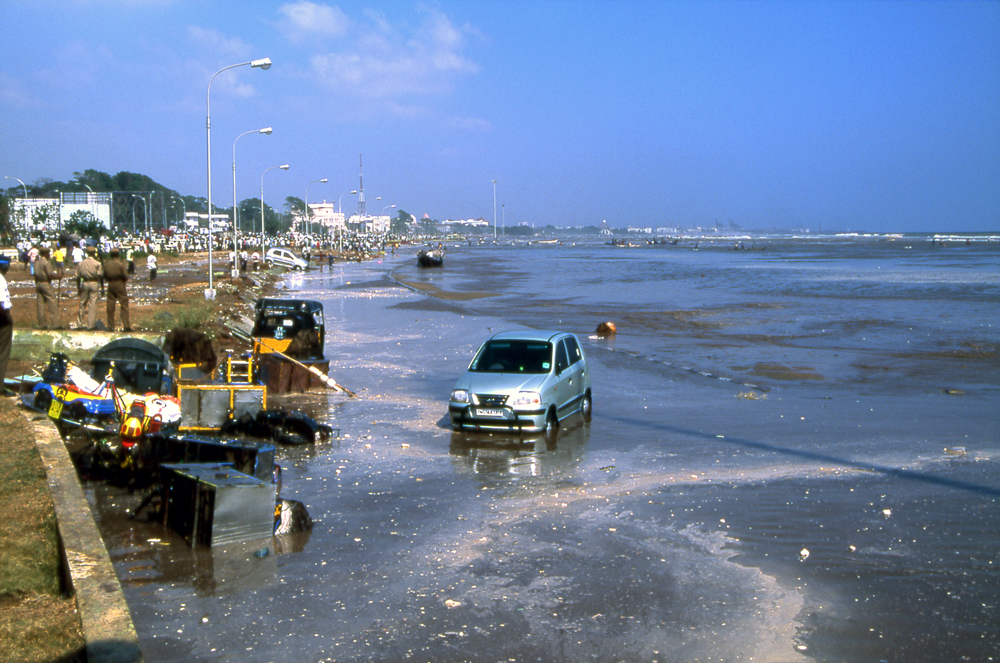
The Marina Beach after the tsunami

The beachfront was severely damaged by the 2004 Indian Ocean tsunami. The tsunami waves, caused due to an M 9.2 magnitude earthquake at about 257 km south-southeast of Banda Aceh, Sumatra, Indonesia, on the Indian Ocean floor on 26 December 2004 at 6.20 am IST, struck the beach, which is about 2028 km North West from the epicentre, at 8.40 am IST. The reported height of the tsunami waves at the beach was 6 m which washed away about 206 persons on the beach, most of whom were morning joggers and children playing cricket on the beach, including a few tourists. With the assistance of the World Bank, the government built 2,000 temporary Marina beach shelters each measuring about 250 sq.ft. to house families affected by the tsunami at a cost of ₹ 172.3 million. However, in 2012, new houses for residents of tenements on the Marina Beach was planned to be taken up under a Disaster Preparedness Project of the state government.

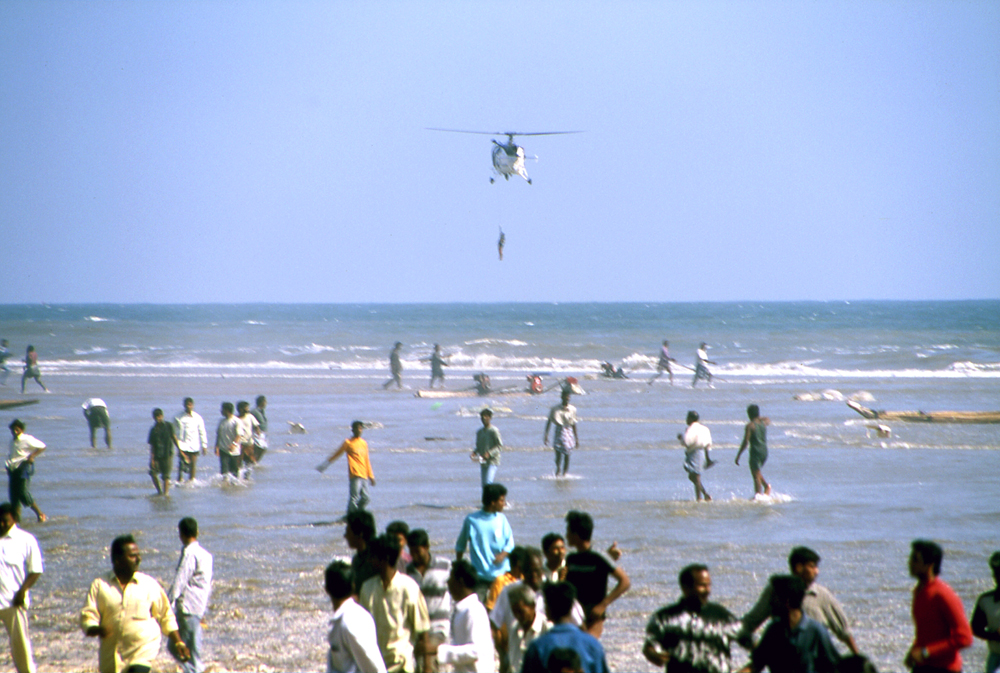
Rescue operations at the beach after the tsunami

As a visible change in the beach immediately after the tsunami, the intertidal area was much flatter on 27 December 2004, which usually featured a gentle slope. However, the usual slope started to appear 4 days after the tsunami and normal profile was restored in about 15 days. The receding wave after the tsunami lasted for more than 24 h. Post tsunami, there was a distinct variation in the distribution of sand grains in the beach until the 4th day. However, from the 5th day after the tsunami, normal composition of sand grains appeared to have been restored at different depths. The tsunami also resulted in various geomorphological changes in the region such as those in the contour of the 2,000 km-long Burma Plate, which sits atop the India plate, resulting in a rise in the land level of Chennai, ranging between 0.5 cm and 3 cm.

Following the tsunami, there was a distinct increase in the meiofaunal density in the beach. Various meiofauna found in the beach after tsunami include foraminiferans (Elphidium sp.), cnidarians (Halammohydra sp., Psammohydra sp.), turbellarians (Otoplana sp., Macrostomum sp.), nemertines, nematodes (Halalaimus setosus, Desmodora sp., Chromadora sp., Sabatieria sp., Steineria sp., Metapselionema sp.), gastrotrichs (Chaetonotus sp., Thaumastoderma sp.), rotifers, kinorhynchs (Cateria sp.), polychaetes (Hesionides sp.), archiannelids (Polygordius madrasensis, Saccocirrus minor), oligochaetes (Marionina sp.), harpacticiod copepods (Arenosetella indica, Psammastacus acuticaudatus, Leptastacus euryhalinus, Emertonia minuta, Sewellina reductus), ostracods (Polycope sp.), isopods (Angeliera phreaticola), halacarids (Halacarus sp.), insects, and various other species.

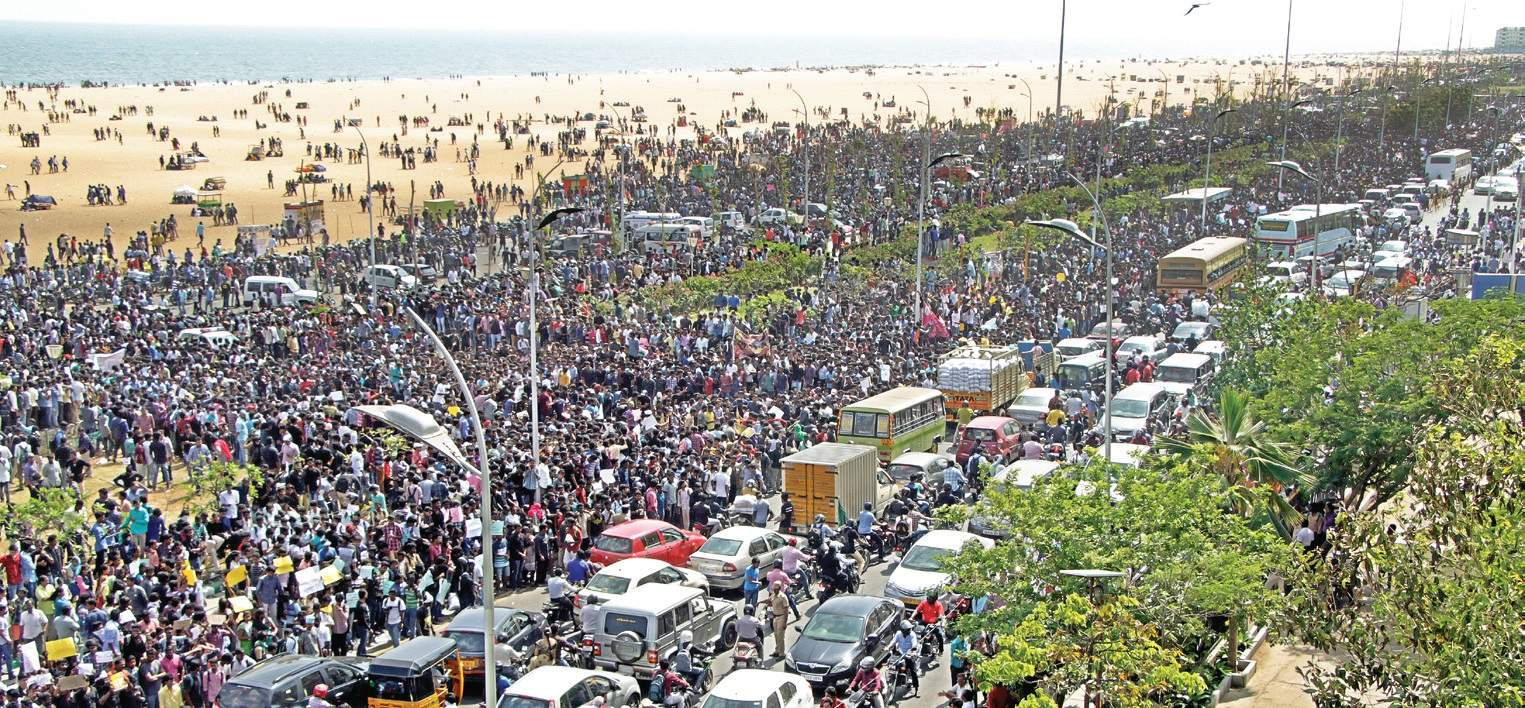
Jallikattu protest at Marina Beach

Marina Beach was also the venue of the 2017 pro-Jallikattu protests. The mass gathering of more than a million people in protest of the ban on the traditional bull-fighting sport Jallikattu at the Marina beach in Chennai for 10 consecutive days turned several eyes on the city's beach from across the nation. The leader-less movement grew much bigger as protests began in other cities across the country and later by Tamils in 15 countries including United States of America, UK, China, Japan and Singapore. The protest came to end only after the ban was revoked after the Prevention of Cruelty to Animals Act, 1960 was amended by the state government to allow the sport.

== Events ==
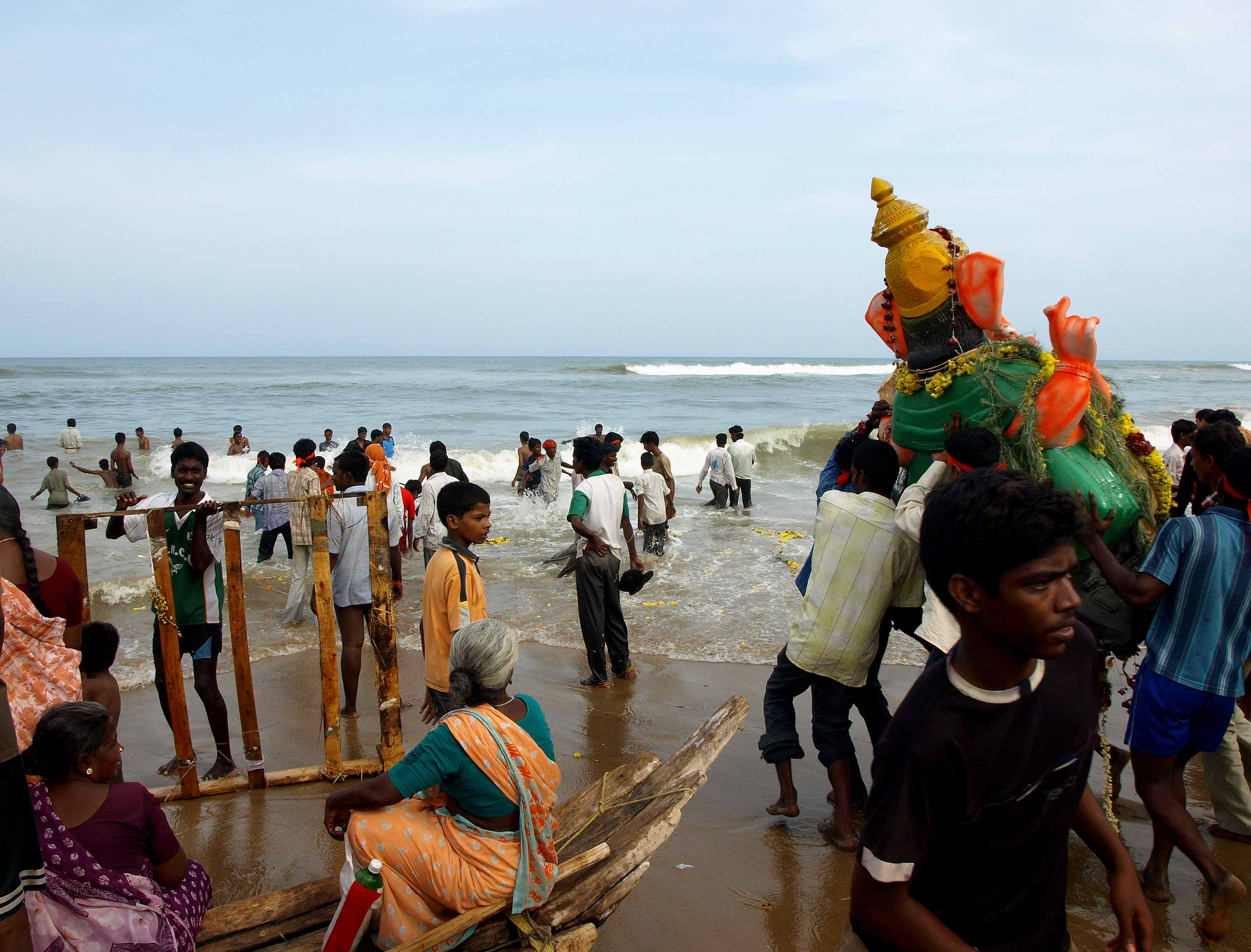
Immersion of Ganesh idols on the Marina at Foreshore Estate

Being the most prominent open space in the city, the Marina Beach hosts several events throughout the year. The annual Independence Day and the Republic Day ceremonial parades and airshows are held along the promenade along with the unfurling of the national flag in the Marina. The annual idol-immersion event following the Hindu festival of Vinayaka Chathurthi takes place at the beach where most of the idols of Lord Ganesh kept on display during the festival in the city is immersed into the sea. The event occurs in the month of August–September. The beach is also the venue for several marathon and walkathon campaigns throughout the year conducted for various cause.

The beach receives the maximum number of visitors on the Kannum Pongal day, a day in the festival season of Pongal in mid-January, when about 150,000 people come to the beach.

The annual Chennai Marathon managed by Chennai Runners is held in the beach starting from the Anna Square to Annai Velankanni Church on the Elliot's Beach in Besant Nagar. It is India's biggest city marathon and is also said to be South India's richest marathon, in which over 1,000 athletes and more than 20,000 people participate, which includes various categories such as a 21-km run for professional athletes, a city run for everybody, a junior run for children, a master's run for senior citizens and a wheelchair run for the disabled.

From 2016, the Marina Runner Marathon managed by Marina Runner Running Group is held every year in the last weekend of February, this event prides itself on promoting running along Marina Beach, the second longest Urban beach in the world.

In 2008, the beach played host to India's first International Beach Volleyball Championship, BSNL FIVB Chennai Challenger:2008, from 15 to 20 July to popularize beach volleyball. The event was organized by the Beach Volleyball Club and was sponsored by Bharat Sanchar Nigam Limited. Eleven Indian teams along with 60 teams from 21 countries participated in the 6-day-long tournament offering a total prize money of US$40,000 in the men's and US$6,400 in the women's events.

In March 2016, "My leader" campaign was launched in this historical place. The main focus of this event was to attract youngsters to take up politics.

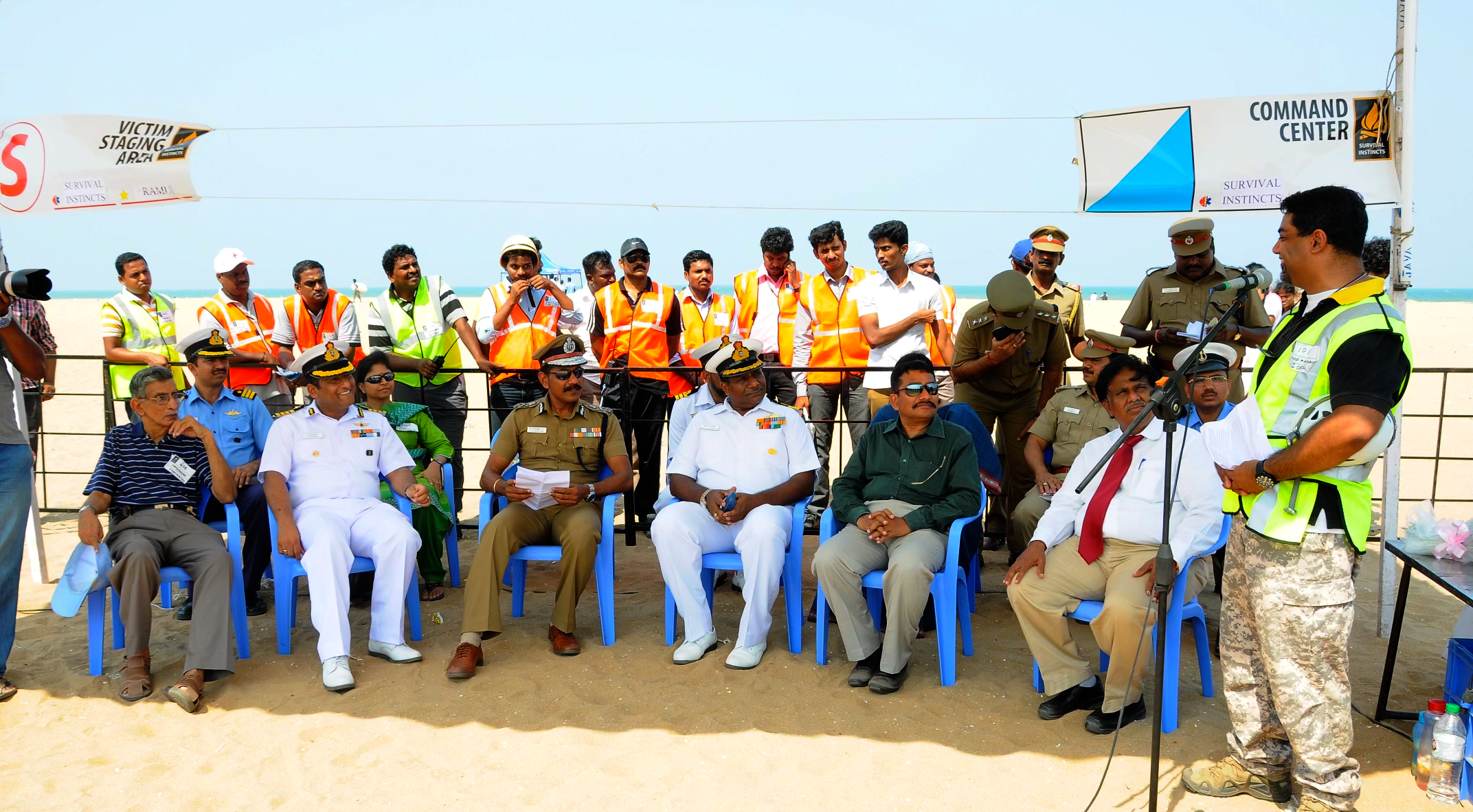
Survival Instincts provides mission briefing to Navy, Coast Guard, and Police Coastal security group.

From 2014, Tsunami and Anti-terrorism Drills have been conducted at the beach by Survival Instincts jointly with Indian Navy, Indian Coast Guard, Tamil Nadu Disaster Management Authority, and Tamil Nadu Police Coastal Security Group.

== Transportation ==
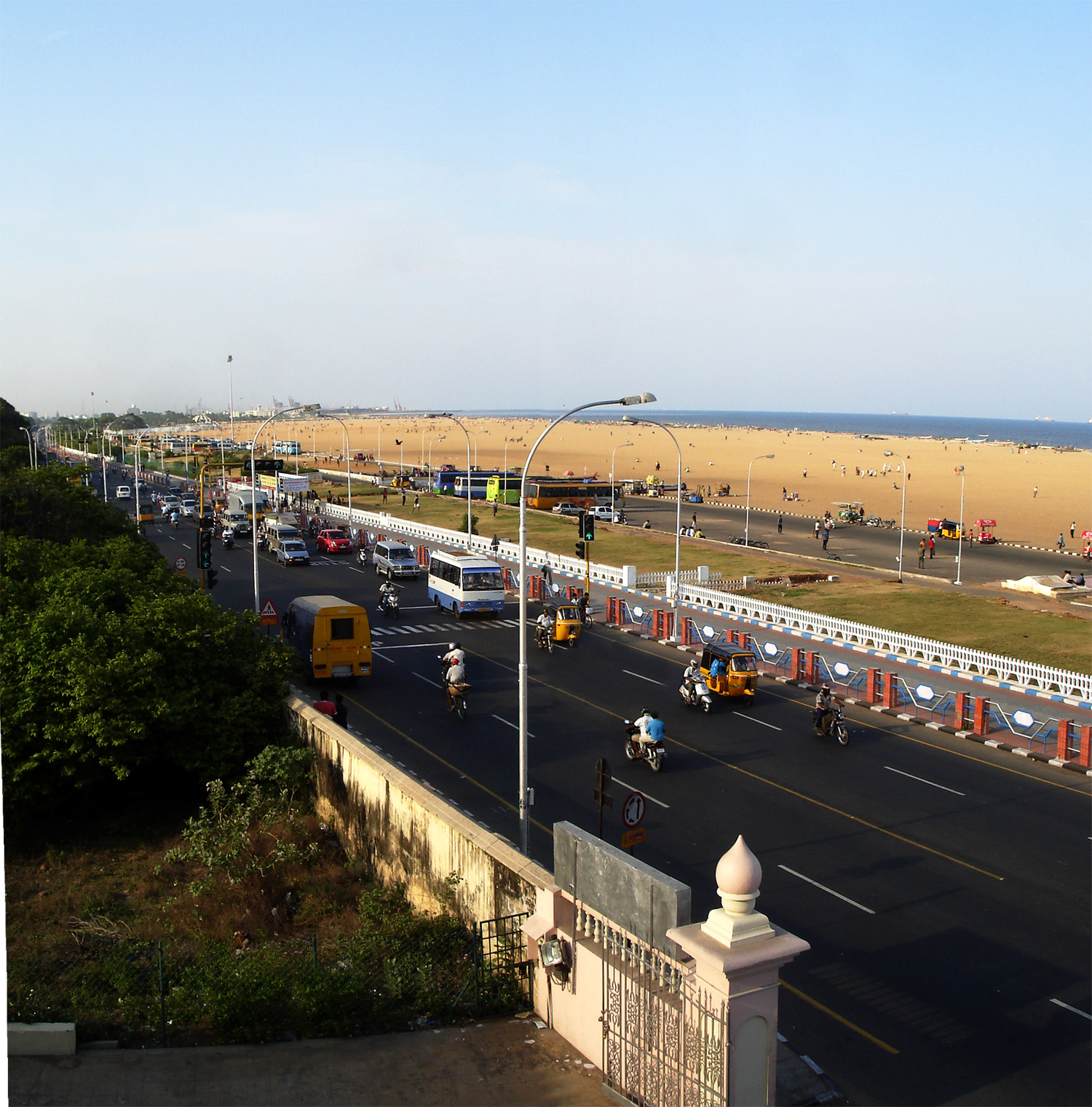
Kamaraj Salai running along the beach

Kamaraj Salai, a six-lane road and one of the arterial roads of Chennai City, runs alongside the beach providing a sea view starting from the Victory War Memorial near the Cooum River delta till the lighthouse to the south. The road extends further south beyond the lighthouse where it is known as the 'Santhome High Road', running away from the sea but parallel to the beach until Santhome. The Metropolitan Transport Corporation has a terminus called the 'Anna Square' terminus at the northern end of the beach, Triplicane Terminus near Kannagi statue/Pycrofts Road, Vivekananda House (Ice House) Terminus and Foreshore Estate terminus. Railway stations alongside the beach include the Chepauk, the Tiruvallikeni and the Lighthouse MRTS railway stations. The Poonamallee–Lighthouse (Line 4) section of the Chennai Metro (Phase II) under construction will connect the beach with other parts of the city.

There was a plan to build a 9.7-km elevated road along the beach connecting the lighthouse with the East Coast Road in the south at a cost of ₹ 10,000 million. However, the plan was dropped due to opposition from the public such as the 'Save Chennai Beaches' campaign.

== Legacy ==
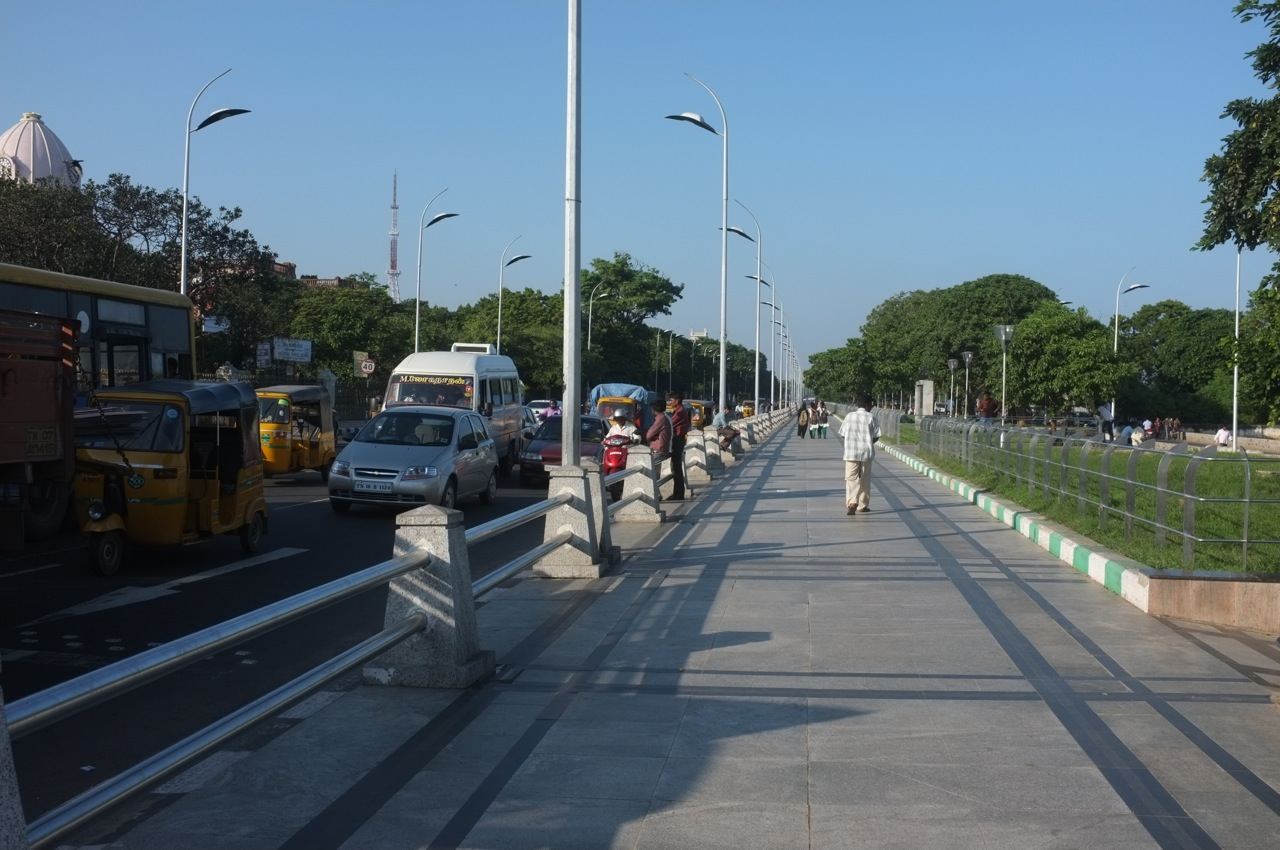
The pedestrian path along the beach

Although the beach promenade was created in 1884, the sandy shore has been mentioned in the literature much earlier. The beach shore has a mentioning in the verse no. 2297 of the 4000 Divya Prabandham written by Peyalwar. The verse, dating back to 7th century CE, was written in Tamil, and it says that the sea was so rich with white waves bringing to the shore very precious gems like red corals and white pearls and that the light of the dusk (moonlight) falls on these gems at the shore and makes the area brightened with beautiful colors.

Grant Duff, the governor of Madras who developed the beach promenade, recalls in his memoirs:

Our way lay first along the shore and made me think of the very sensible answer made to me when I was talking about going to India. 'Go', he said, 'For God's sake go. If you spend only twelve hours on the beach at Madras, it will be a great deal better than nothing'.

Grant Duff christened it the Madras Marina in 1884, the same year when the beach promenade was created, on which he explains in a letter:

We have greatly benefited Madras by turning the rather dismal beach of five years ago into one of the most beautiful promenades in the world. From old Sicilian recollections, I gave in 1884 to our new creation the name of Marina; and I was not a little amused when walking there last winter with the Italian General Saletta, he suddenly said to me 'On se dirai a Palerme'.

In New India, the newspaper that was run by Annie Besant, the Irish theosophist and Home Rule advocate, the beauty of Marina Beach was described back in 1914. On 6 October 1914, Anne Besant wrote,

One of the chief attractions of Madras is undeniably its Marina. There is nothing in all of India to match this long and pleasantest of promenades that runs by the side of the foam-crested surf from the southern extremity of the Fort to Santhome. The Marina is certainly a cap of this 'city of magnificent distances'. An old promenade, popularly known as 'Cupid's Bow' south of the fort, now hides her head in shame besides her statelier and more favoured sister.

She also added that Madras

... in keeping with her dignity as a progressive city with a population of over half a million souls, (its) delectable evening resort, Marina Beach will be converted into being 'a thing of beauty and joy forever'.

== Future developments ==
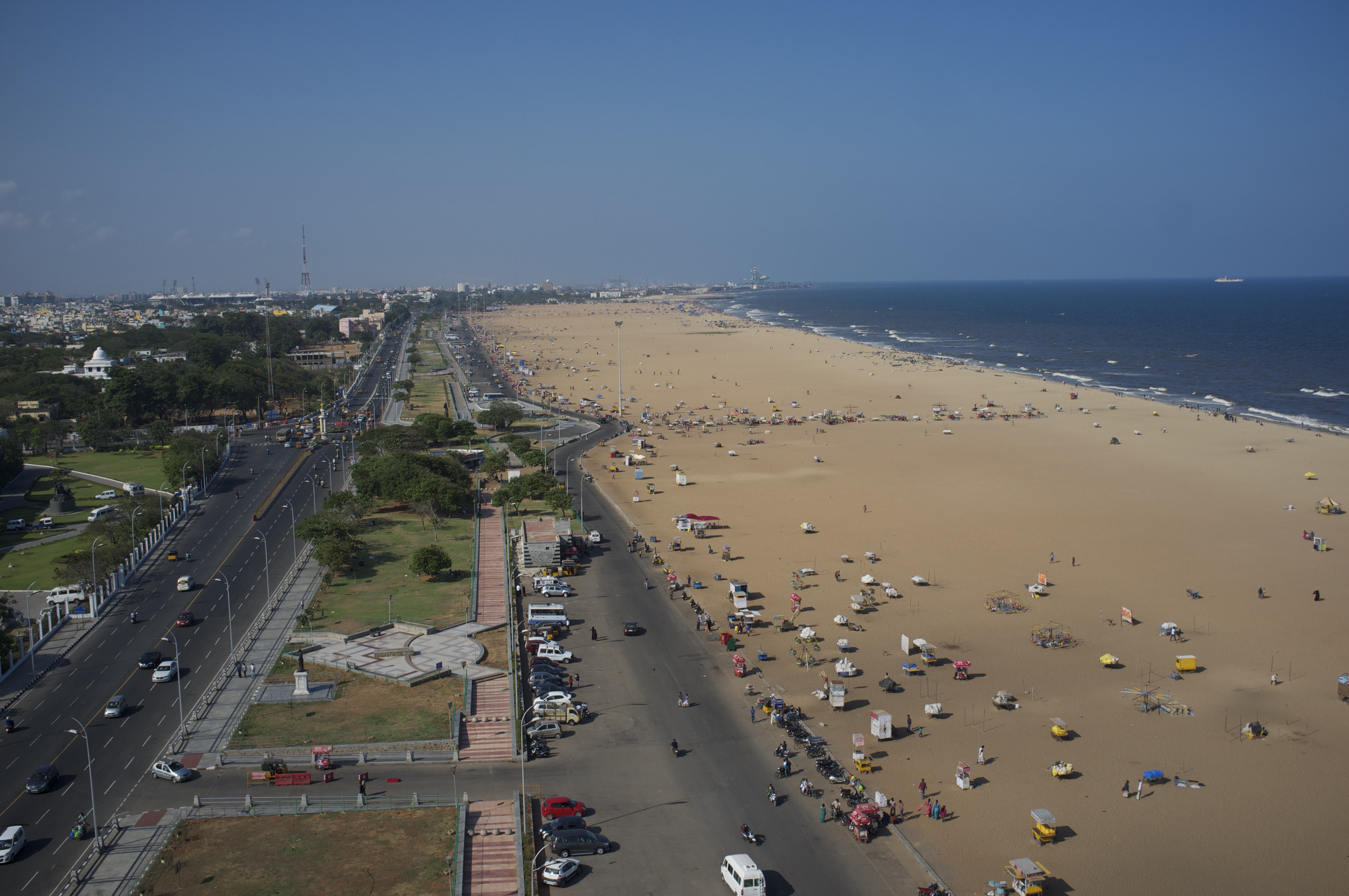
View of the beach from the lighthouse

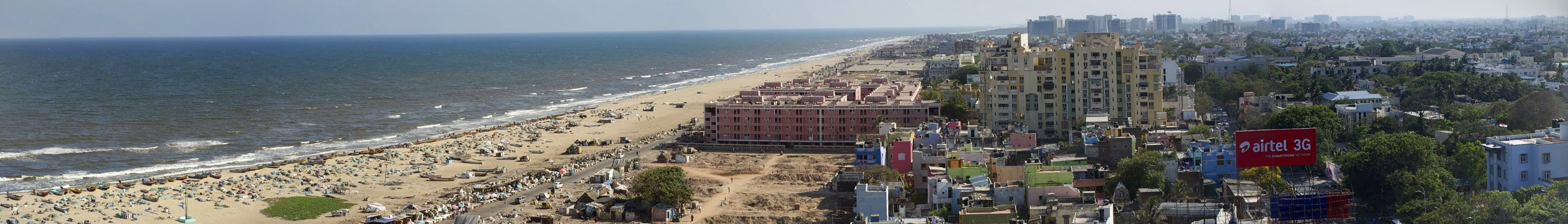
Southern stretch of the beach, south of the lighthouse

In January 2014, the corporation announced a makeover of the 2.8-km stretch on the southern part of the beach from Lighthouse to Foreshore Estate, including development of walkways, benches, a gallery, bicycle tracks, concrete roads, service trenches, rainwater trenches and streetlight fittings at an estimated cost of ₹ 400 million. The development would provide alternative accommodation to vendors of the existing market on the Marina Loop Road by commissioning of a modern fish market on the stretch. The loop road connecting the Lighthouse and Foreshore Estate, which is currently a 20-metre-wide road, will be converted to a four-lane concrete road barricaded on both sides with stainless steel pillared railings and will pass all along the Santhome coast of the Marina Beach. A 2.4-metre-wide bicycle track, a 3.3-metre-wide walkway and a 2.5-metre-wide gallery will be developed on the eastern side of the road. The western side of the road will have a fish market with cold storage facilities as well as a walkway.

The corporation also plans to develop more than 300 heritage pillars, each 1.2 meters tall, on the western side of Kamaraj Salai opposite the beach. The uniformly designed heritage pillars will be made of granite and iron on the stretch from All India Radio to Swami Sivananda Salai. The pillars would replace the existing walls of various institutions to improve aesthetics around the beach. In 2018, the Corporation revealed plans to make the beach disabled-friendly.

As of 2019, the Greater Chennai Corporation was exploring the feasibility of conducting water sports on the Marina beach.

== In popular culture ==
Marina Beach has been featured in numerous Tamil movies, including the 2012 Tamil movie Marina that is entirely based upon the lives of child workers in the beach. The entire story and screenplay for the comedy hit film Kadhalikka Neramillai were conceived on Marina Beach and the "Enna Paarvai" song sequence in the film was filmed in this beach.

== See also ==
- Elliot's Beach
- Golden Beach
- List of beaches in India
