= Anna Memorial =

Memorial in Chennai, India

Coordinates: 13.0656°N 80.2844°E

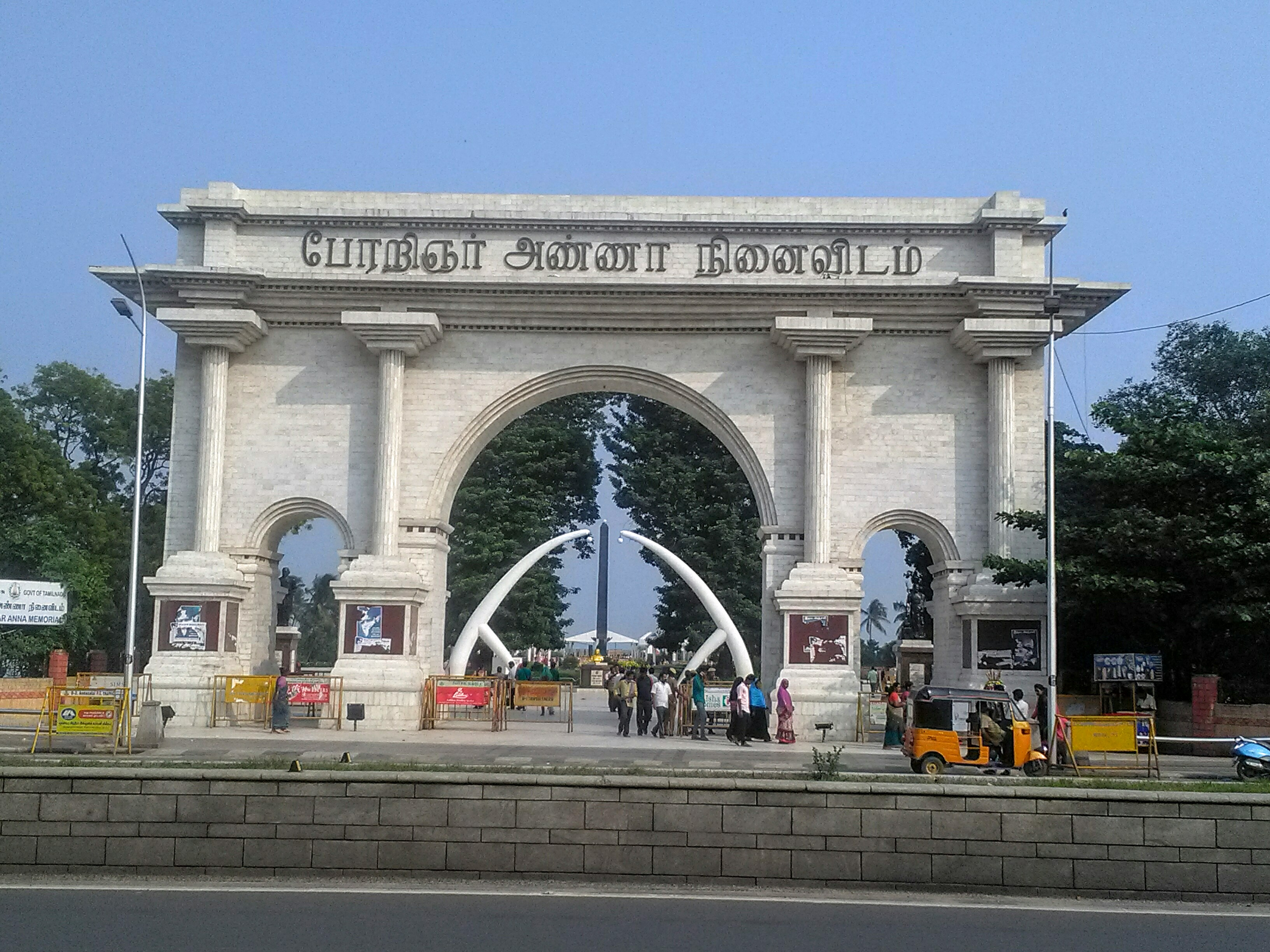
View of the entrance and the Anna Arch

Anna Memorial, officially Perarignar Anna Memorial, is a memorial dedicated to the former chief minister of Tamil Nadu C. N. Annadurai (Anna), where a black marble platform was raised on the spot of Anna's cremation in February 1969. The memorial lies on a footpath that leads to the two-semicircle house-shaped platform around the memorial. The cemetery consists of an eternal flame at one end, with the sword pillar topped with a spherical-shaped doom light. Located on Kamarajar Promenade, on the northern end of Marina Beach in Chennai, Tamil Nadu, India, abutting the M.G.R. and Amma Memorial, the memorial of former chief ministers of Tamil Nadu M. G. Ramachandran and J. Jayalalithaa. Later, on 8 August 2018, the Anna Memorial Complex was expanded to include a memorial for another former chief minister of Tamil Nadu, M. Karunanidhi.

== History ==
In 1996–1998, during the reign of the DMK party, the memorial was remodelled at a cost of ₹ 27.5 million and the entrance arch carried the design of the 'Rising Sun', the symbol of the DMK party. However, the design was removed after the opponent AIADMK party returned to power in May 2001.

In 2012, the memorial was renovated at a cost of ₹ 12 million. In 2018, when his protégé M. Karunanidhi, died, he was buried behind his mentor. A new memorial for Karunanidhi is being planned at a cost of ₹390 million rupees.

== Museum ==
The memorial also houses a museum on Annadurai, which is located at the northern side.

== Gallery ==
Anna Memorial Complex

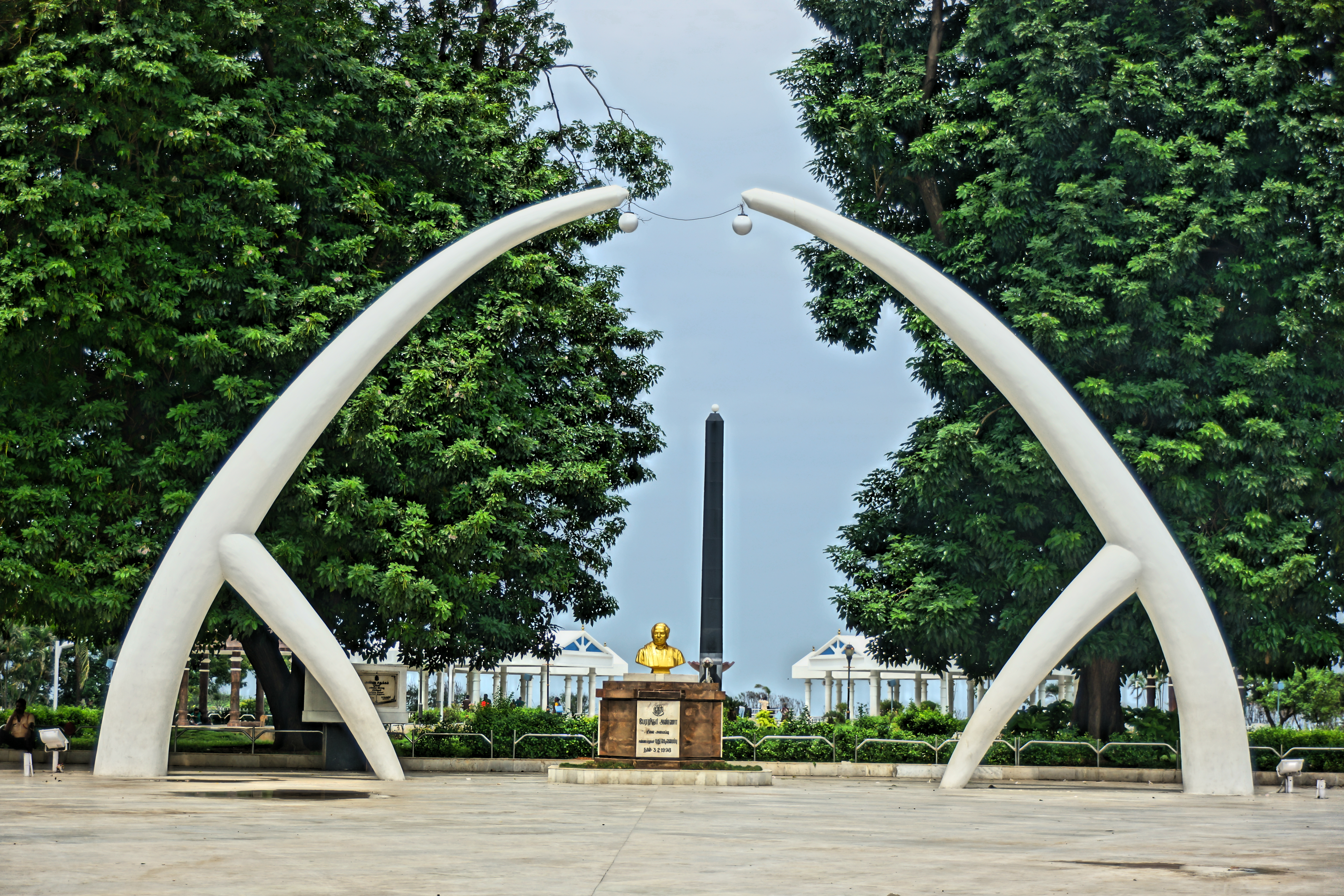
Main corridor of the memorial

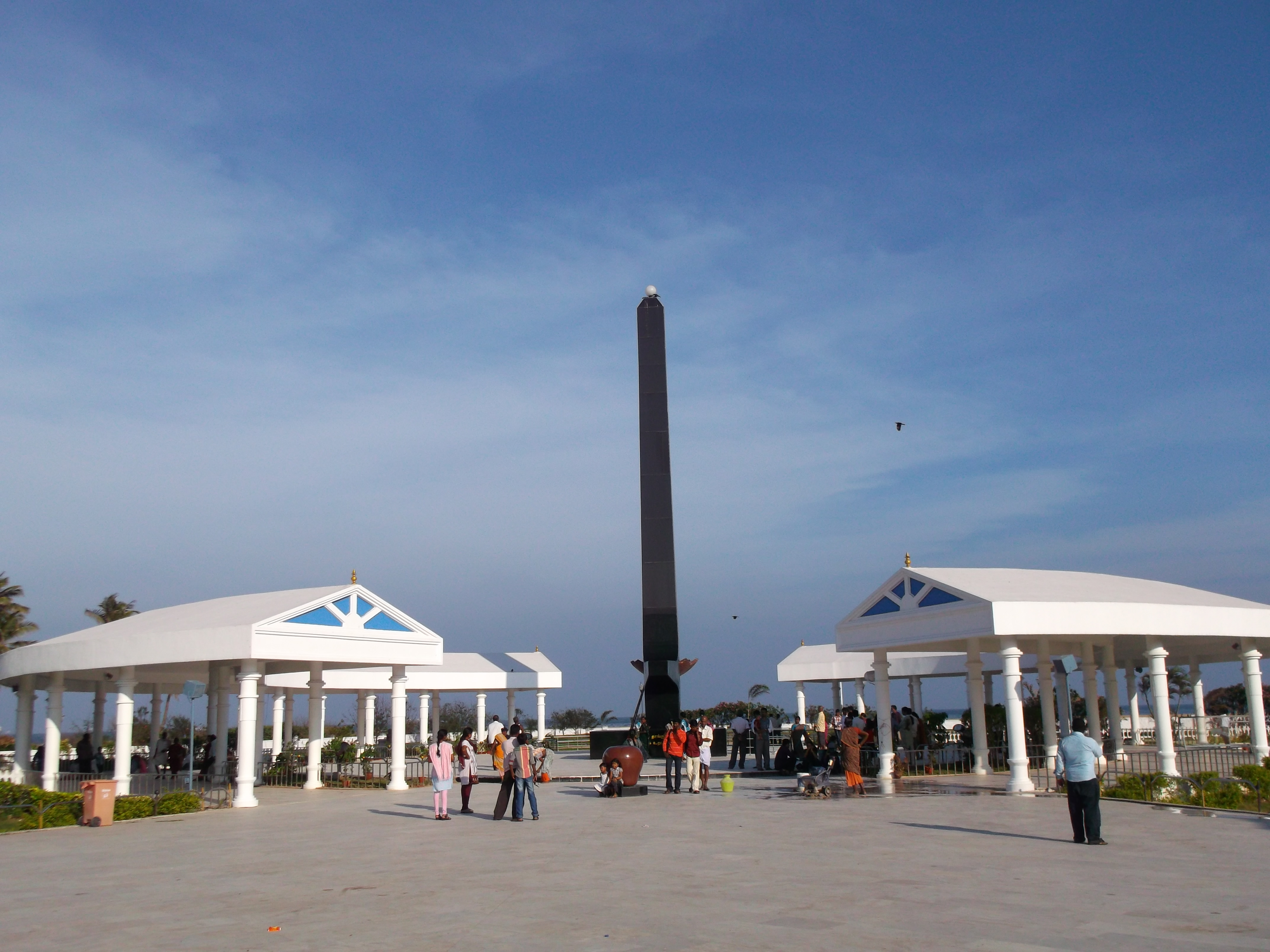
Two-semicircle house-shaped wall houses the Anna Memorial

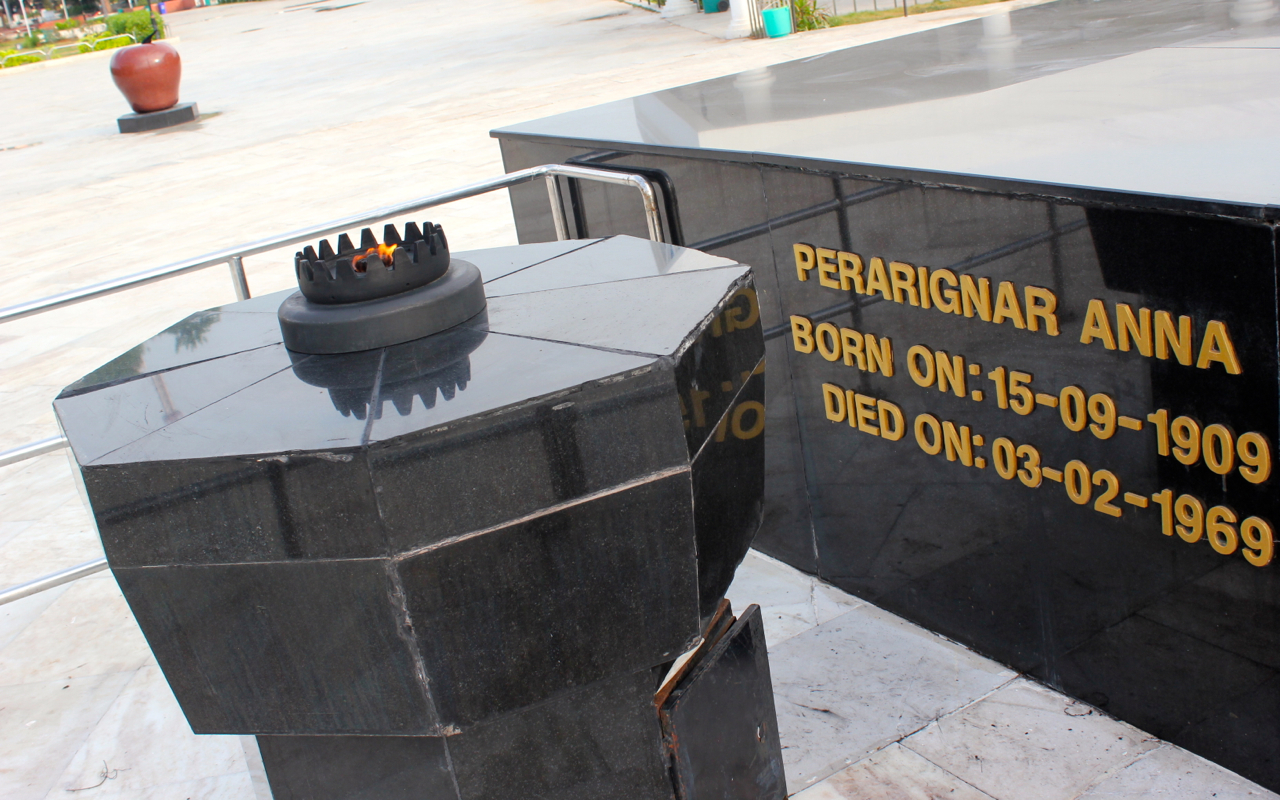
An eternal flame near the cemetery of Anna

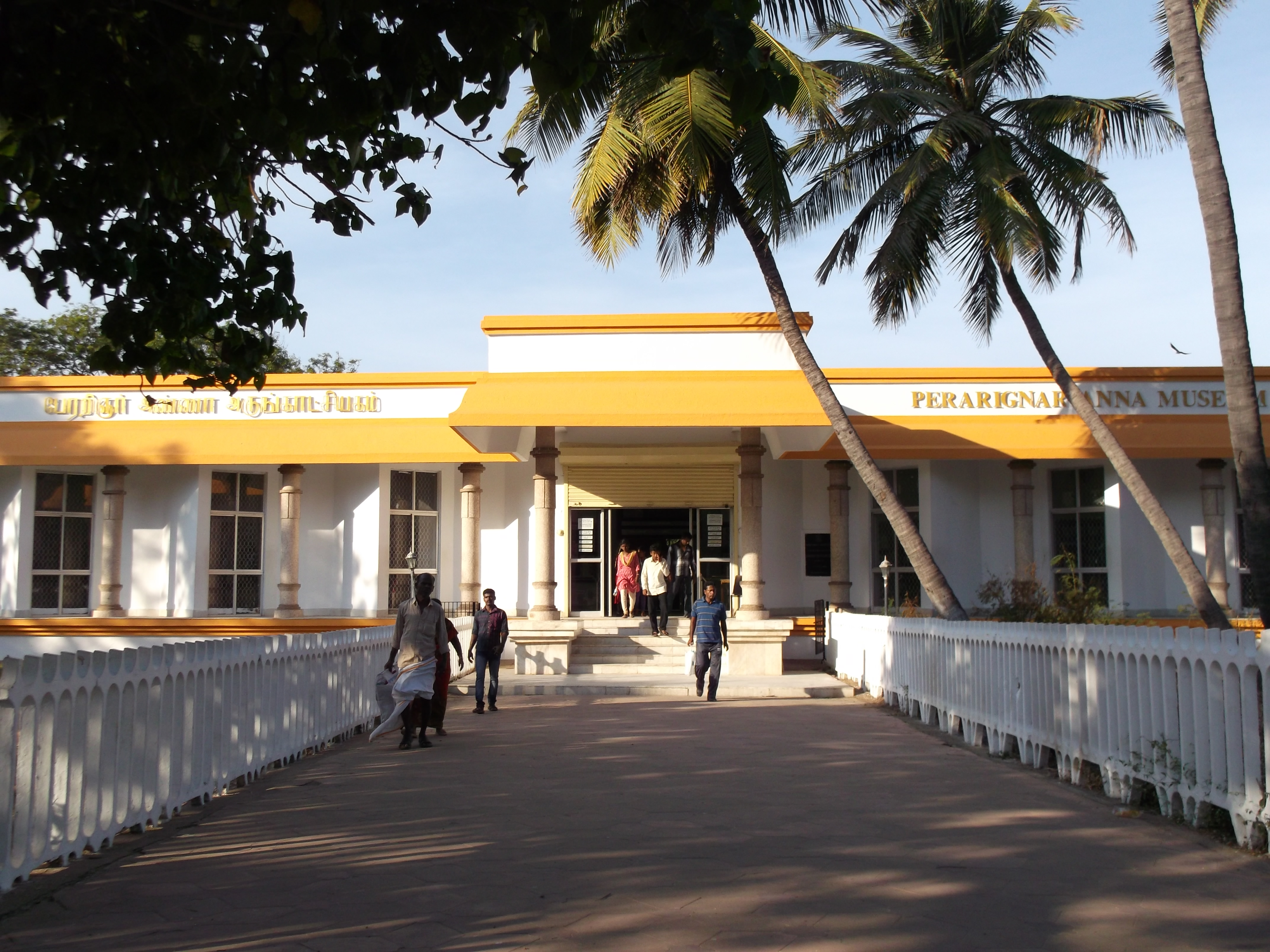
Perarignar Anna Museum inside the memorial complex

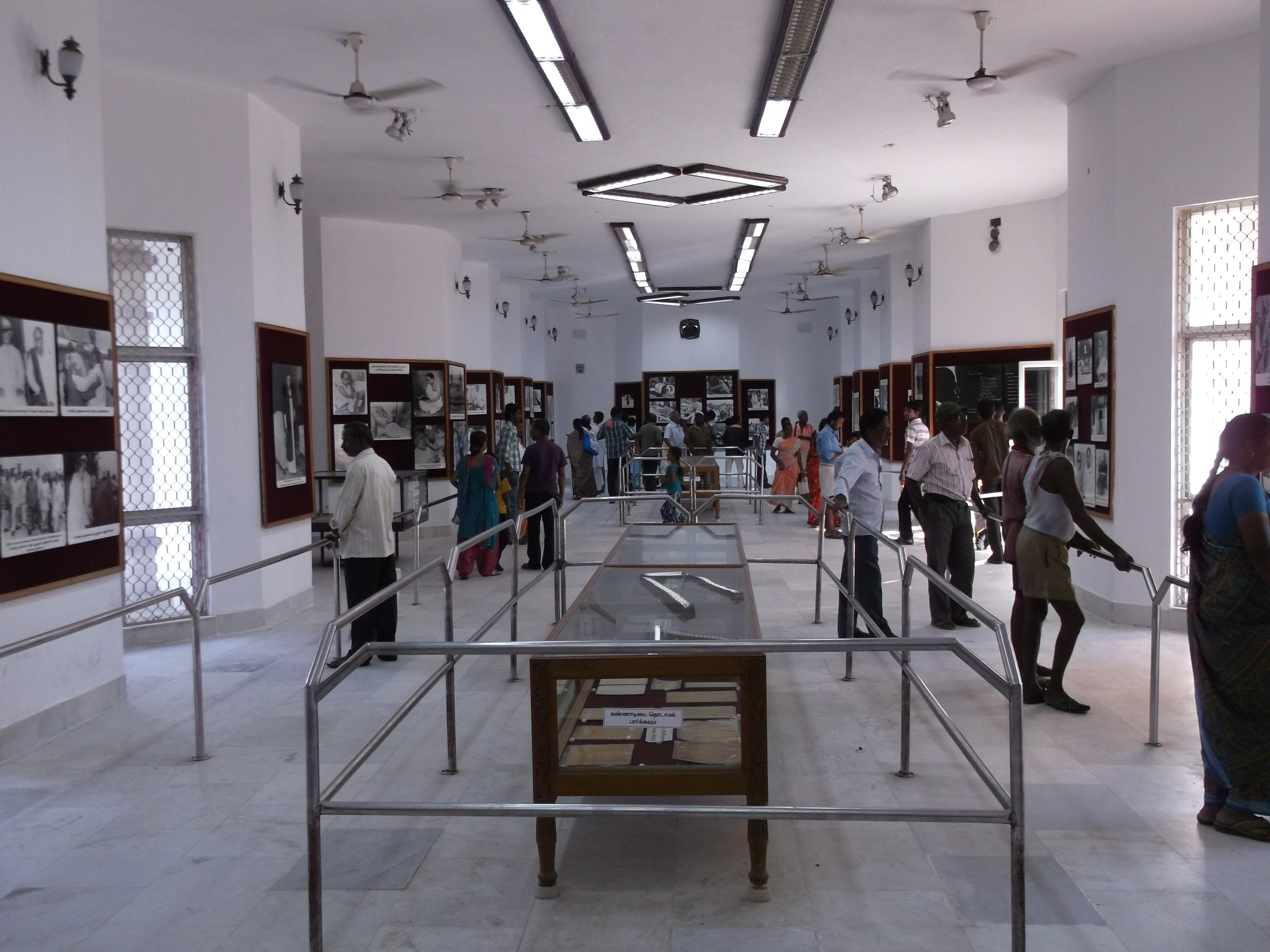
Photo galleries inside the Perarignar Anna Museum

== See also ==
- M.G.R. and Amma Memorial
- Marina Beach
