= M.G.R. and Amma Memorial =

Memorial complex in Chennai, Tamil Nadu, India

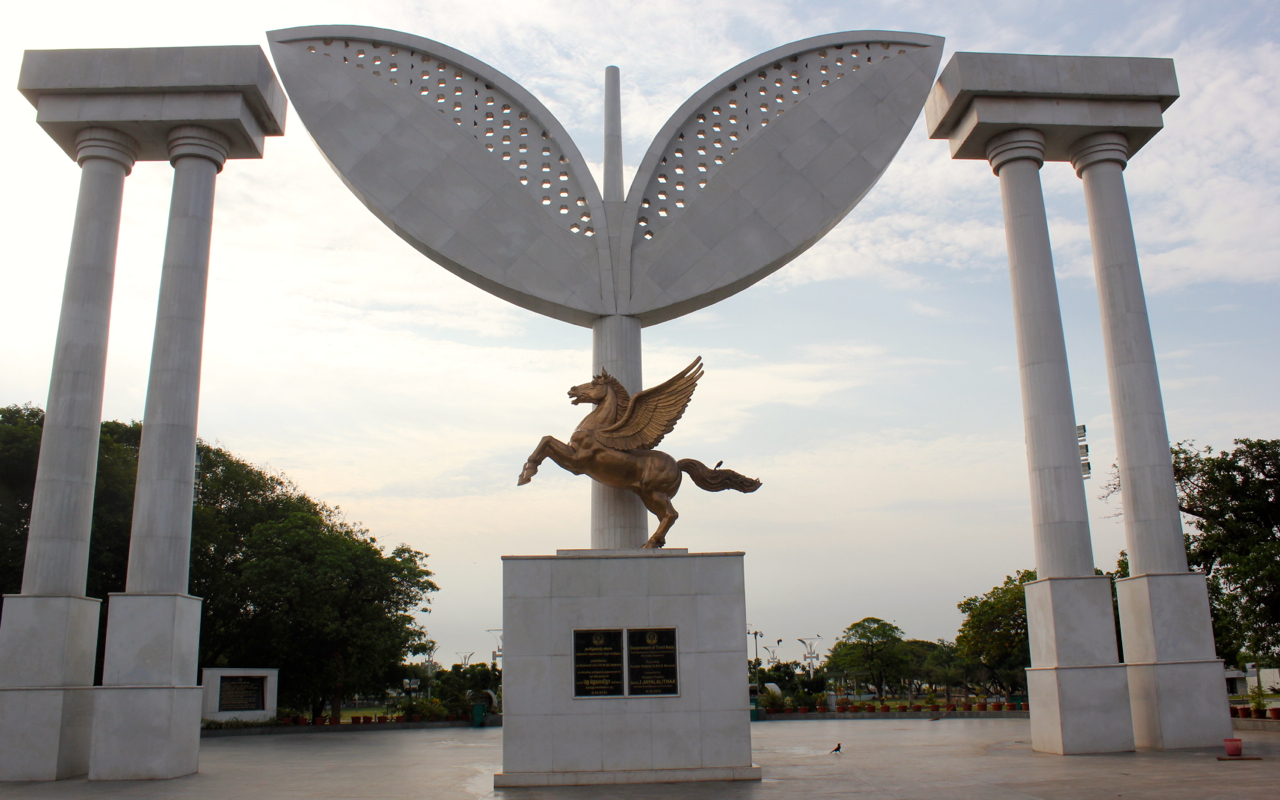
- Façade of the memorial complex at the Marina Beach
- Interactive map of the M.G.R. and Amma Memorial area
- Alternative names: M.G.R. and Amma Ninaividam; M.G.R. and Amma Square

General information
- Type: Tomb and Museum
- Architectural style: Lotus-shaped (M.G.R.) and Phoenix-shaped (Amma)
- Location: Kamarajar Promenade, Marina beach, Chennai, India
- Coordinates: 13°3′52.38″N 80°17′3.3″E
- Groundbreaking: 25 December 1987 and 6 December 2016
- Owner: Government of Tamil Nadu

M.G.R. and Amma Memorial, officially Bharat Ratna Puratchi Thalaivar Dr. M.G.R. and Puratchi Thalaivi Amma Selvi J. Jayalalithaa Memorial, is a memorial complex dedicated to the former chief ministers of Tamil Nadu M. G. Ramachandran (M.G.R.) and J. Jayalalithaa (Amma), where a black marble platform was raised on the spot of M.G.R.'s cremation on 25 December 1987 and on the spot of Jayalalithaa's on 6 December 2016. An eternal flame illuminates both cemeteries, with a portrait of each individual placed at one end. A stone footpath leads to the lotus-shaped wall enclosure that houses the M.G.R. Memorial, with the sword pillar topped with a spherical-shaped dome light, and a stone footpath leads to the phoenix-shaped wall enclosure that houses the memorial of M.G.R.'s protégé and the former chief minister of Tamil Nadu Jayalalithaa. The memorial complex is located on Kamarajar Promenade, adjacent to the Anna Memorial on Marina Beach in Chennai, Tamil Nadu, India.

== History ==
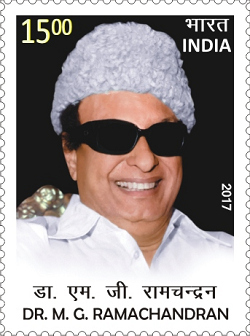
M. G. Ramachandran
(1917–1987)

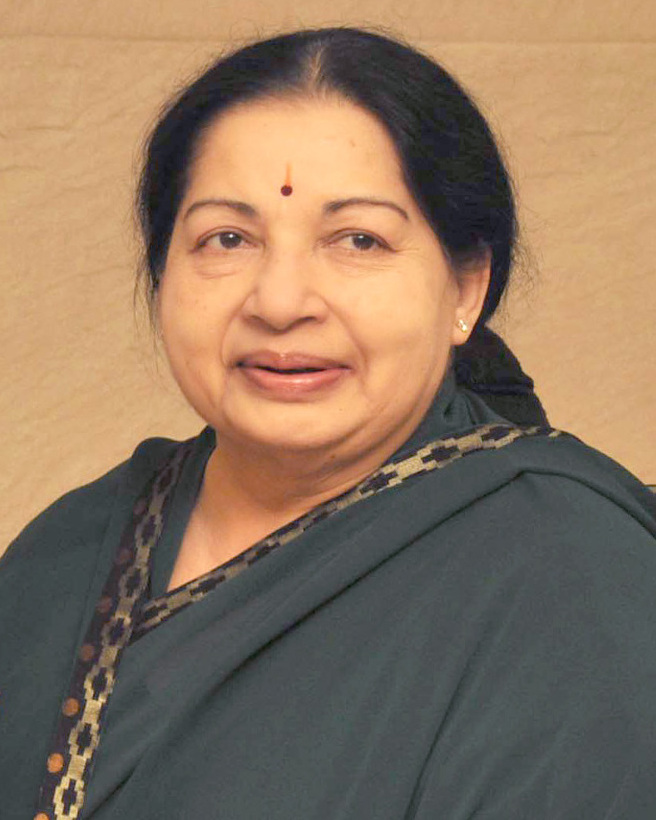
J. Jayalalithaa
(1948–2016)

=== M.G.R. Memorial ===
The memorial was built in the memory of the former chief minister of Tamil Nadu M. G. Ramachandran, the first actor to become the chief minister in the Republic of India, and that too by winning three consecutive legislative assembly elections and continuing to be in the position until his death. Considered one of the greatest political leaders and actors of the state, his followers idolise him as "Puratchi Thalaivar" (Revolutionary Leader). He was posthumously awarded the Bharat Ratna, the highest civilian award of the Republic of India.

On 24 December 1987, after his prolonged illness, he suffered cardiac arrest at 1:00 a.m. and was declared dead at 3:30 a.m. in his M.G.R. Thottam residence in Ramapuram, Chennai. He was 70 years old, just a month away from his 71st birthday on 17 January 1988. His death sparked a frenzy of looting and rioting all over the state. Shops, cinemas, buses, and other public and private property became the targets of violence. The police had to resort to issuing shoot-at-sight orders. Schools and colleges immediately announced holidays until the situation was under control. Violence during the funeral alone left 129 people dead and 47 police personnel badly wounded. Young and married women allegedly shaved their heads bald and dressed like widows. Men whipped themselves until they bled to death. There were some extreme instances where people burnt themselves to death and burnt villages down.

His body was kept in state at Rajaji Hall for the public to pay their tribute for two days, from 8:40 a.m. on 24 December until 1:00 p.m. the next day. On 25 December 1987, the funeral procession began at 1:25 p.m., and his remains were buried at the northern end of Marina Beach, proximate to his mentor and the former chief minister of Tamil Nadu C. N. Annadurai's memorial, named the Anna Memorial. He was laid to rest in his iconic attire, complete with his white fur cap, dark glasses, and his famous Seiko watch on his right wrist.

=== Amma Memorial ===
The memorial was built in the memory of the former chief minister of Tamil Nadu J. Jayalalithaa, the second actress to become the chief minister in the Republic of India after M.G.R.'s wife, V. N. Janaki Ramachandran. Jayalalithaa served as the general secretary of the All India Anna Dravida Munnetra Kazhagam from 1988 to 2016 and has the second-longest tenure of chief ministership in Tamil Nadu, having served multiple terms and continuing to hold the position until her death. Considered one of the greatest political leaders and actresses of the state, her followers idolise her as "Puratchi Thalaivi" (Revolutionary Leader). She was the first and only woman to serve as the leader of the opposition in the Tamil Nadu Legislative Assembly.

On 22 September 2016, Jayalalithaa was admitted to Apollo Hospitals in Chennai as she was suffering from an infection and acute dehydration. On 12 October 2016, she was also said to be suffering from a severe pulmonary infection and septicaemia, which were cured. On 4 December 2016, she was re-admitted to the intensive care unit after suffering a cardiac arrest around 4:45 p.m. The hospital released a press statement stating that her condition was "very critical" and that she was on life support. On 5 December 2016, the hospital announced her death around 11:30 p.m., and she became the first female chief minister to die in office in the Republic of India. She was 68 years old, just two months away from her 69th birthday on 24 February 2017.

Her body was kept in state at her residence, Veda Nilayam in Poes Garden, Chennai, until the wee hours of 6 December 2016 and later at Rajaji Hall for the public to pay their tribute. Her last rites were performed on the evening of 6 December 2016, and her remains were buried at the northern end of Marina Beach in a sandalwood casket engraved with "Puratchi Thalaivi Selvi J Jayalalithaa", adjacent to the grave of her mentor and the former chief minister of Tamil Nadu M. G. Ramachandran's memorial, named the M.G.R. Memorial.

== Construction and Renovation ==
The memorial complex spreads over 8.25 acres and has the highest number of visitors along the seafront. The M.G.R. memorial started its construction work in 1988 and was inaugurated by M. G. Ramachandran's wife and the former chief minister of Tamil Nadu V. N. Janaki Ramachandran in May 1990. In 1992, the memorial complex was remodelled and laid with marble by the government of Tamil Nadu led by chief minister J. Jayalalithaa. Between 1996 and 1998, the mausoleum was again renovated at a cost of about ₹2.75 crore. When the Indian Ocean tsunami struck the seafront in December 2004, the memorial was damaged. Repair works cost approximately ₹1.33 crore.

In 2012, the memorial was again renovated at a cost of ₹4.3 crore, including ₹3.4 crore for remodelling the facade and the surrounding wall. This renovation included a new entrance with the Two Leaves, the electoral symbol of the All India Anna Dravida Munnetra Kazhagam, and Pegasus, the horse from Greek mythology; landscaping of the open area around the memorial using Korean grass; and the planting of exotic, decorative plants such as palmyra alpha, date palm, spider lily, and adenium. Also included were a granite pathway shaped like a guitar, stainless steel handles around the memorial, a fountain in the middle, a waterfall at the rear, decorative lamps, and an overhead tower with lights both at the entrance and on the arch. Two 18-metre-wide pergolas were also constructed, in addition to ramps for the physically challenged.

The erection of the two leaves insignia at the façade of the entrance as an arch was opposed by the Dravida Munnetra Kazhagam. A public interest petition was filed in the Madras High Court in October 2012 against the erection of that insignia, but it was dismissed by the court.

In 2016, when M.G.R.'s protégé and the former chief minister of Tamil Nadu J. Jayalalithaa, died, she was buried behind her mentor in the memorial complex. A new memorial was built for her at a cost of ₹50 crore. The memorial is planned to be built in the shape of a phoenix, covering the cemetery of Jayalalithaa. On 7 May 2018, the foundation stone was laid for the construction of the memorial by the chief minister of Tamil Nadu Edappadi K. Palaniswami, in the presence of prominent members of the All India Anna Dravida Munnetra Kazhagam. The memorial is named Amma Memorial, as Jayalalithaa is fondly called Amma by her followers and party cadres.

On 27 January 2021, the memorial and the museum of J. Jayalalithaa, named Amma Memorial and Amma Museum, respectively, were inaugurated by the chief minister of Tamil Nadu Edappadi K. Palaniswami, in the memorial complex.

== Entrance ==
The facade of the memorial complex was a tall entry arch with a concrete replica of the Two Leaves, the electoral symbol of the All India Anna Dravida Munnetra Kazhagam, founded by the former chief minister of Tamil Nadu M. G. Ramachandran. The facade was also given a Grecian touch with the erection of a 12-foot-high bronze sculpture of Pegasus, the winged horse of Greek mythology. The 3.75-tonne sculpture, by architect R. Ravindran, is set on a 4.5-meter-high pedestal.

Two 15.9-metre-high columns serving as the entrance were built with reinforced concrete. The elevated structure of the two leaves is supported by a 6-metre-high beam serving as the stem. The leaf structure, with a span of 10.2 metres for each leaf, is a metre higher than the towering columns. The leaves have a slight resemblance to a honeycomb and are visible from both the front and the rear.

== Gallery ==
M.G.R. and Amma Memorial Complex

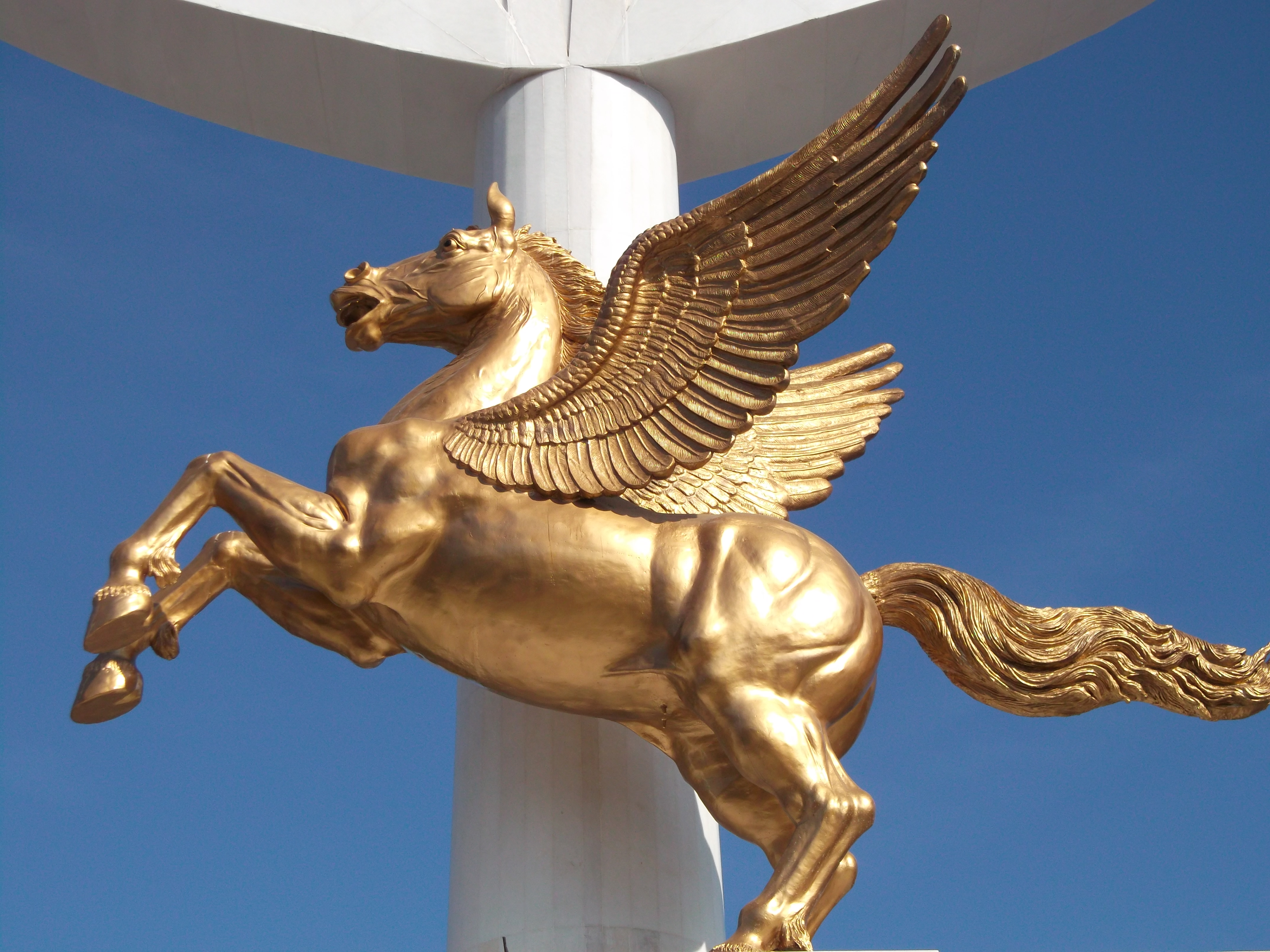
Bronze Pegasus at the entrance to the memorial

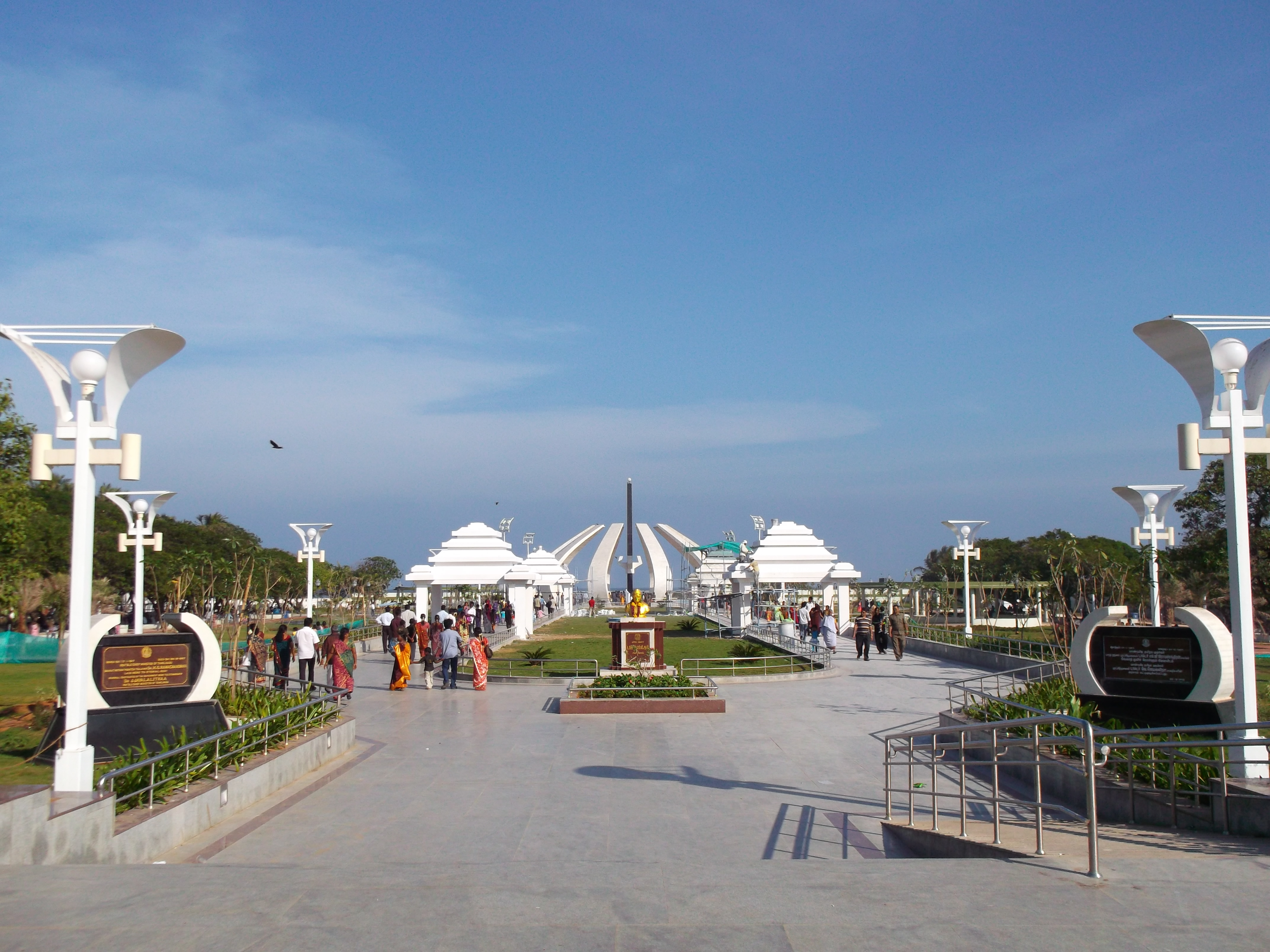
Main corridor of the memorial

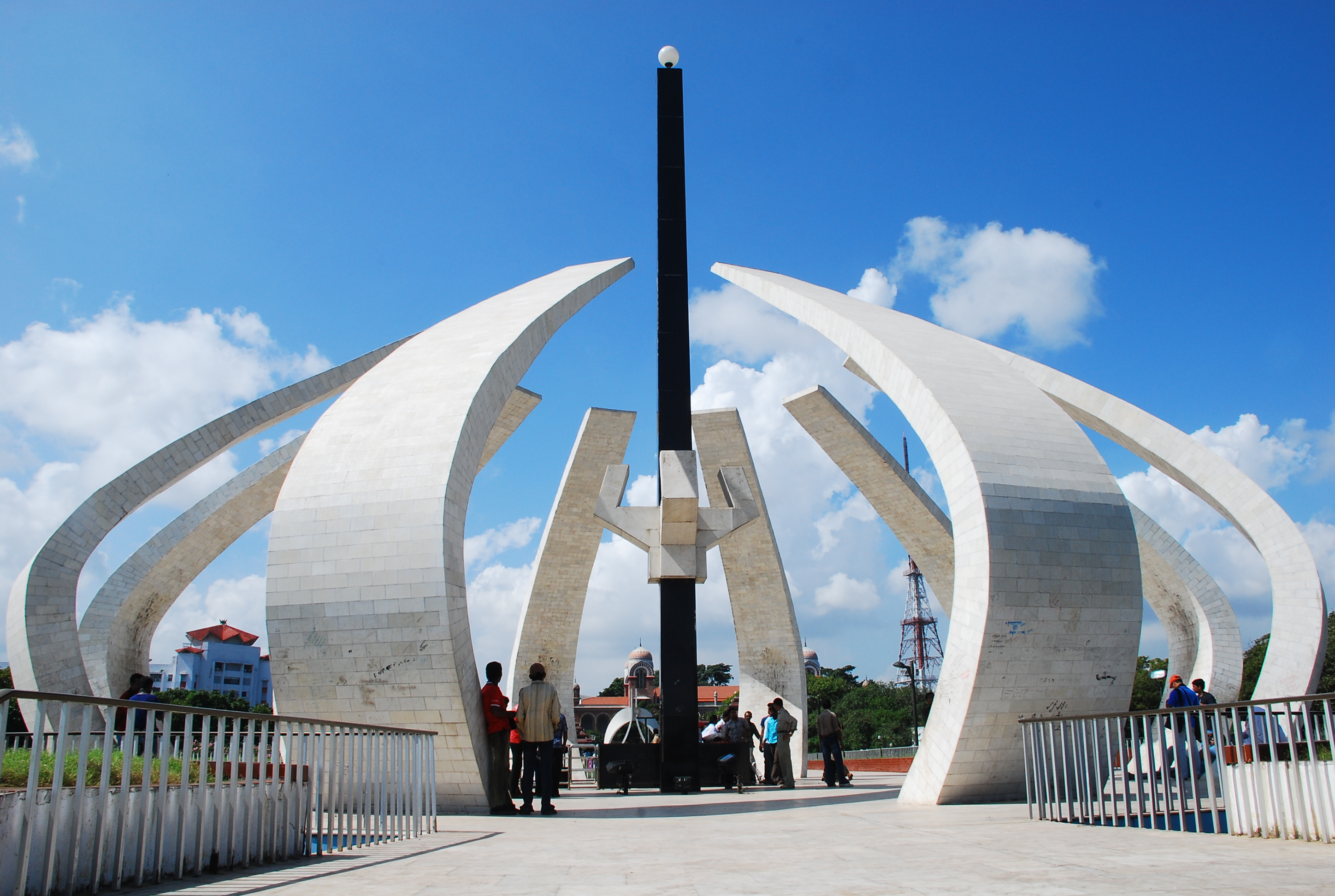
Lotus-shaped wall houses the M.G.R. Memorial

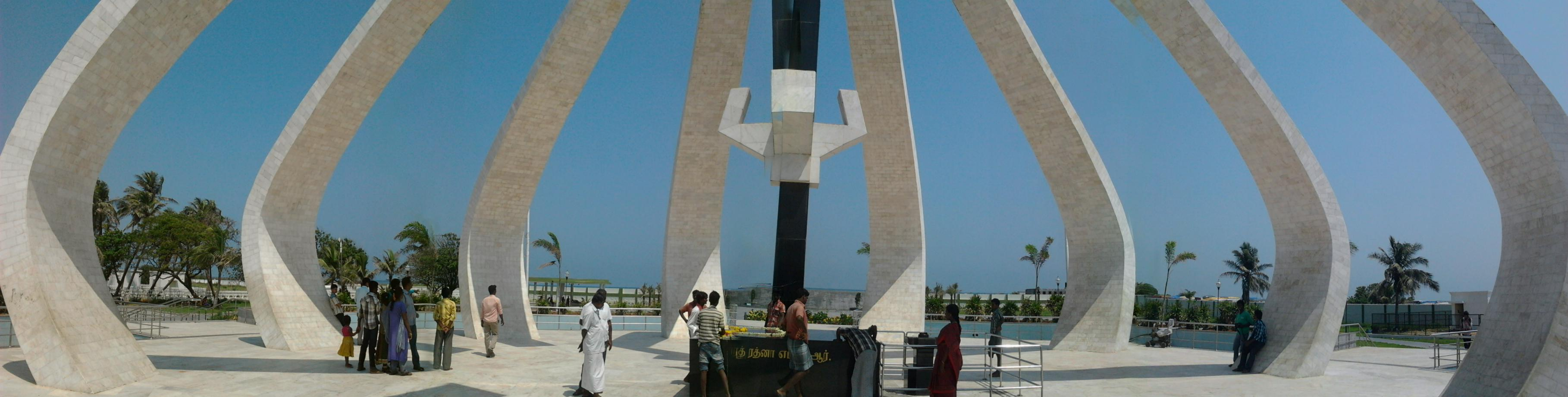
A panoramic view of the M.G.R. Memorial

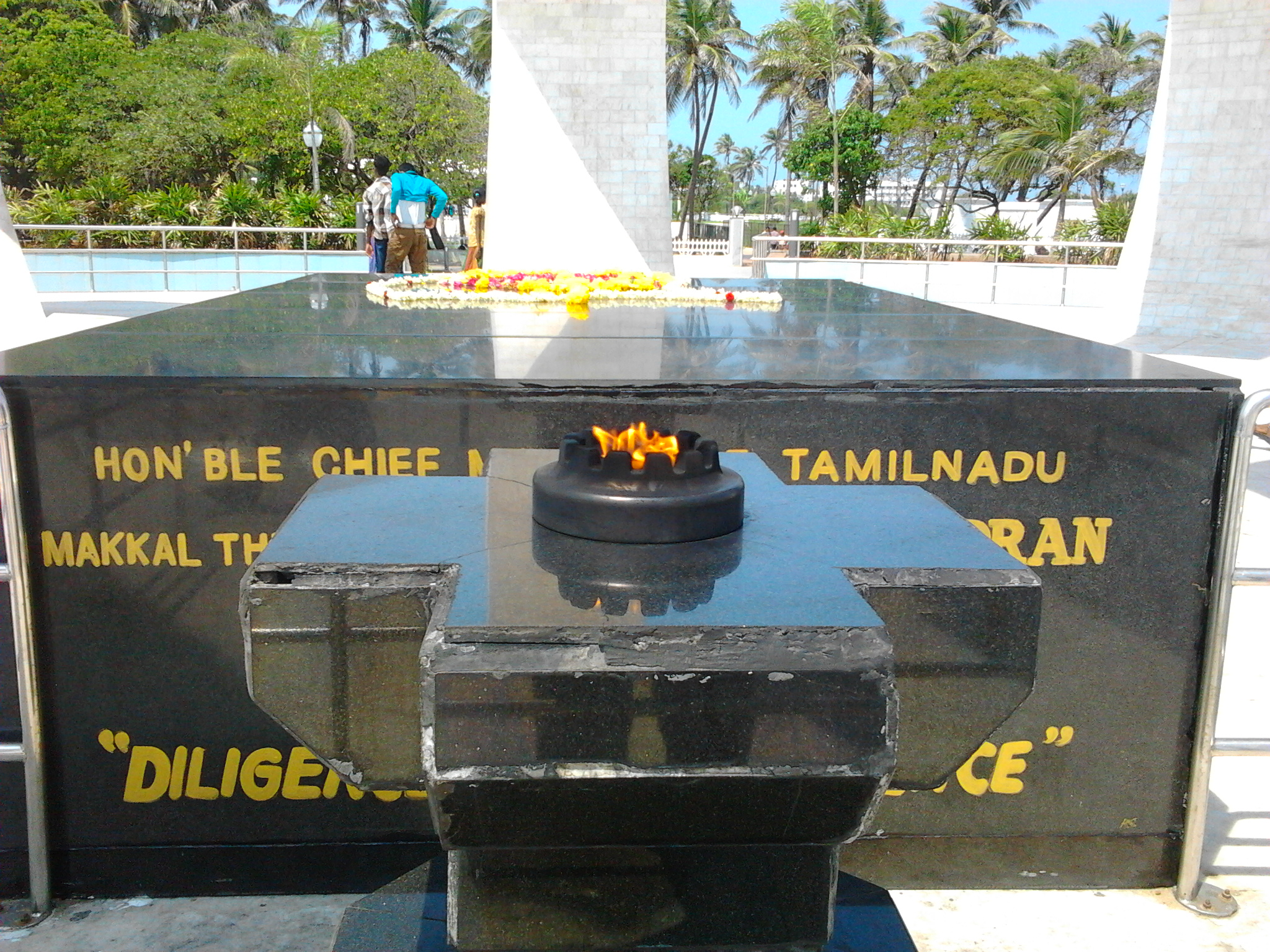
An eternal flame near the cemetery of M.G.R.

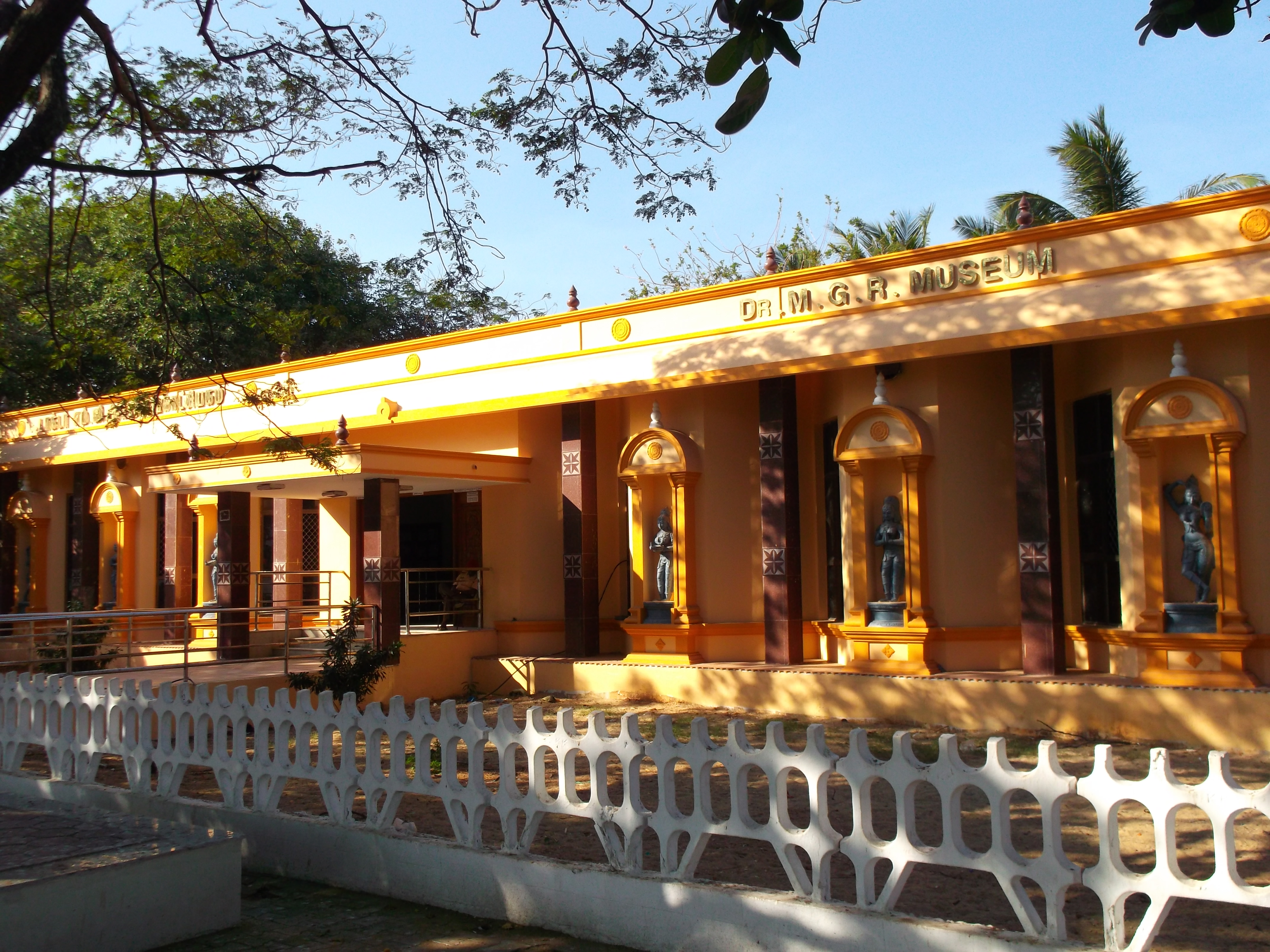
Dr. M.G.R. Museum inside the memorial complex

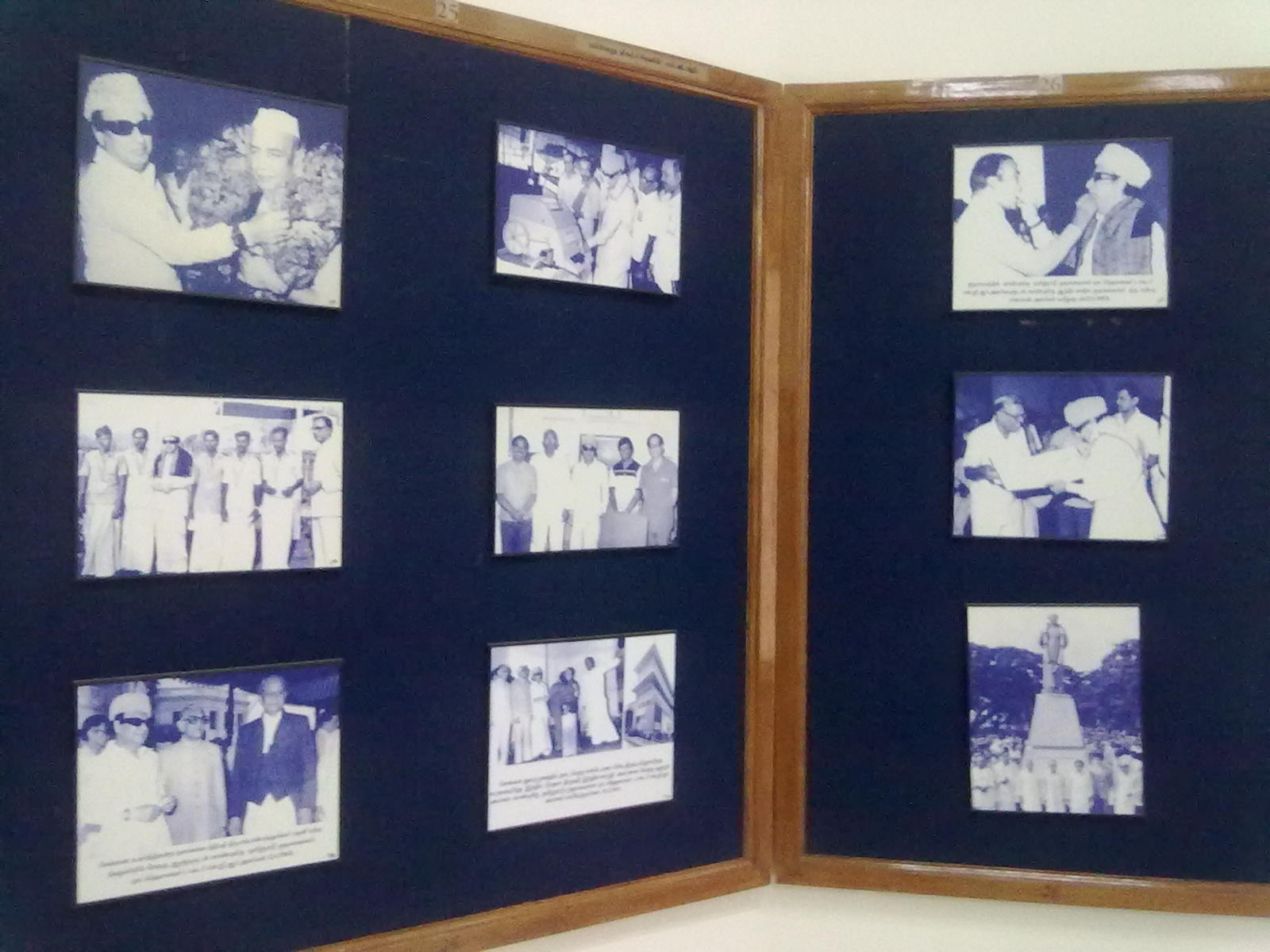
Photo gallery inside the Dr. M.G.R. Museum

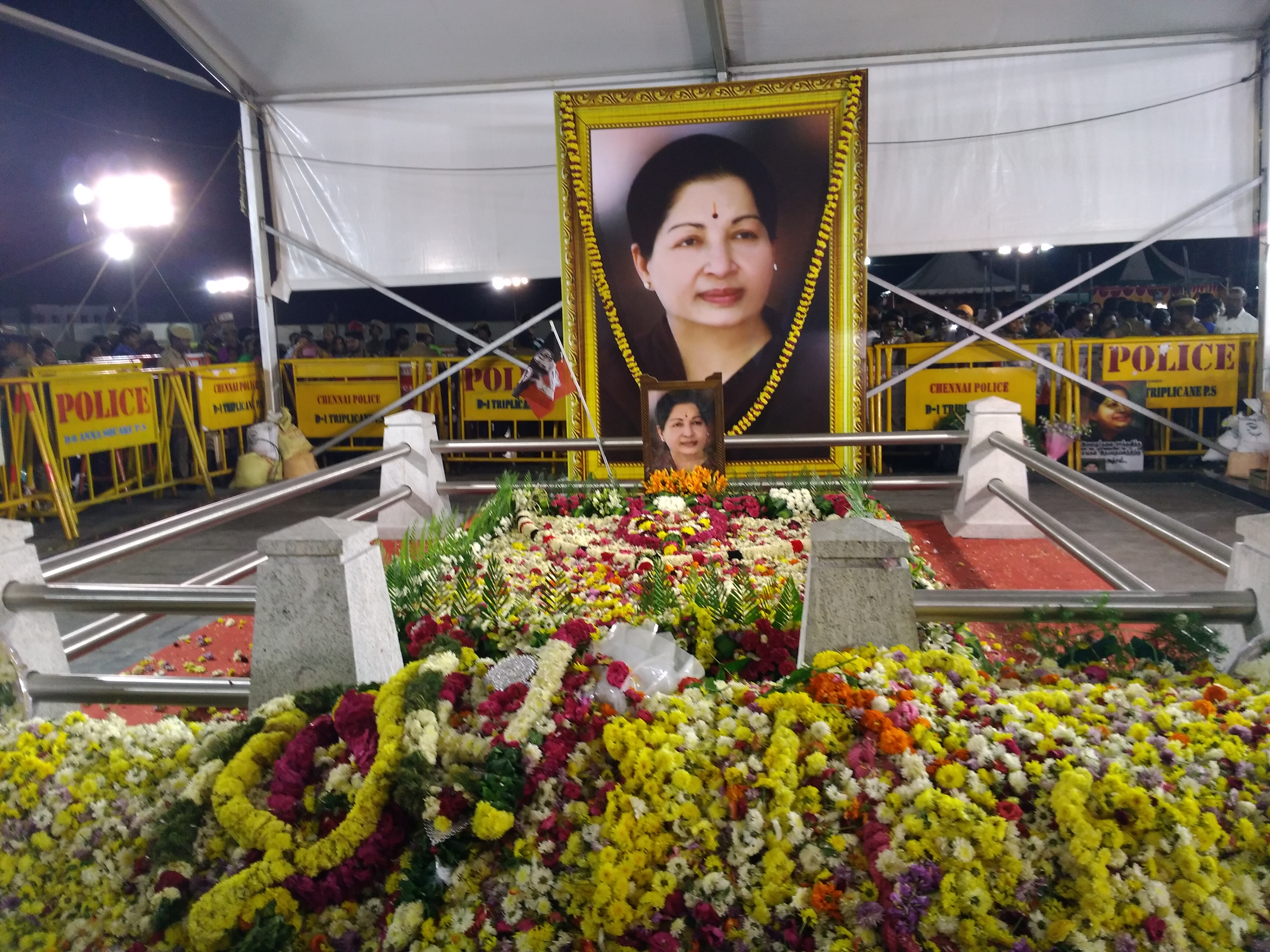
Amma Memorial on the next day of cremation

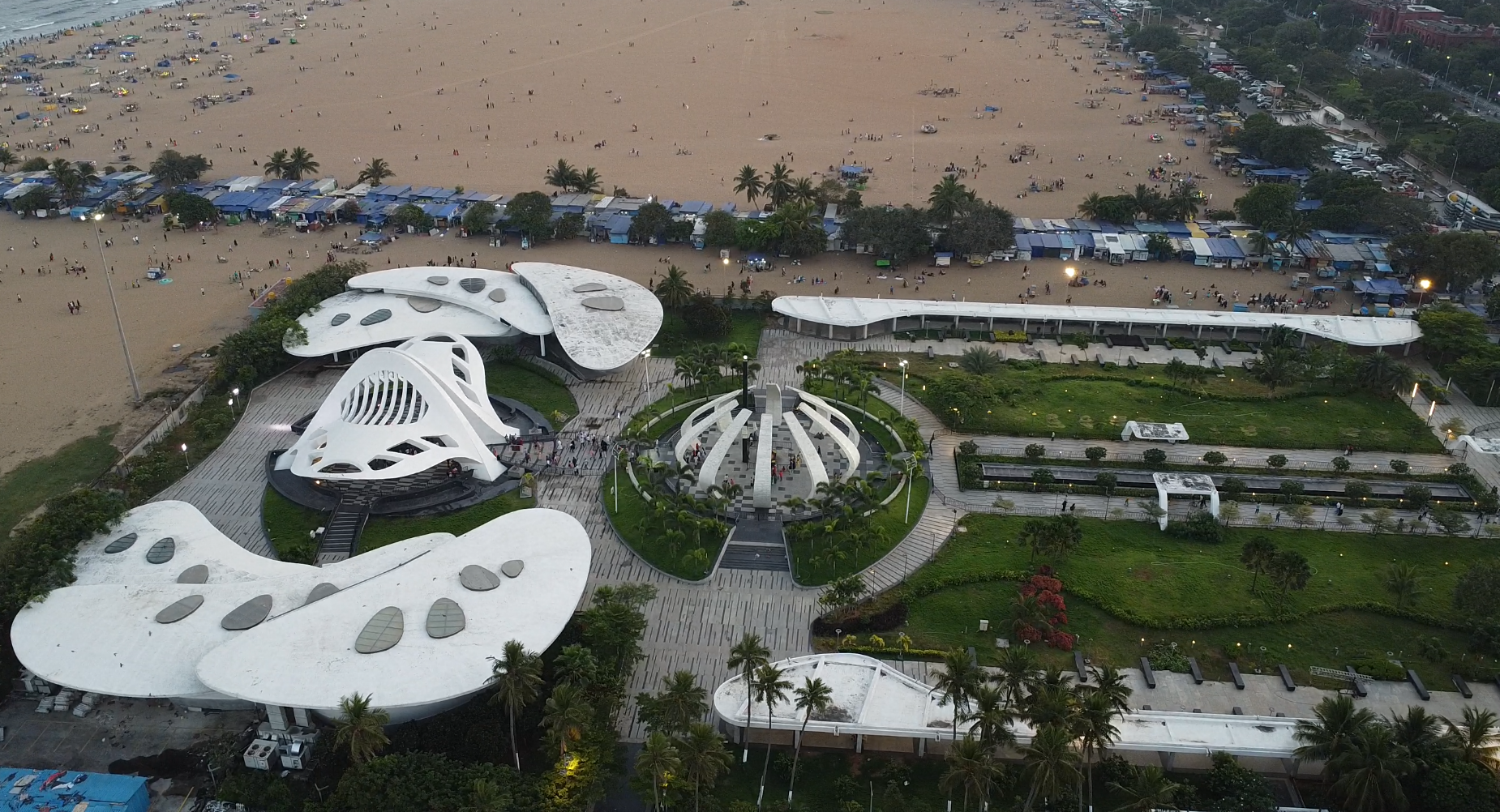
An aerial view of the M.G.R. and Amma Memorial Complex

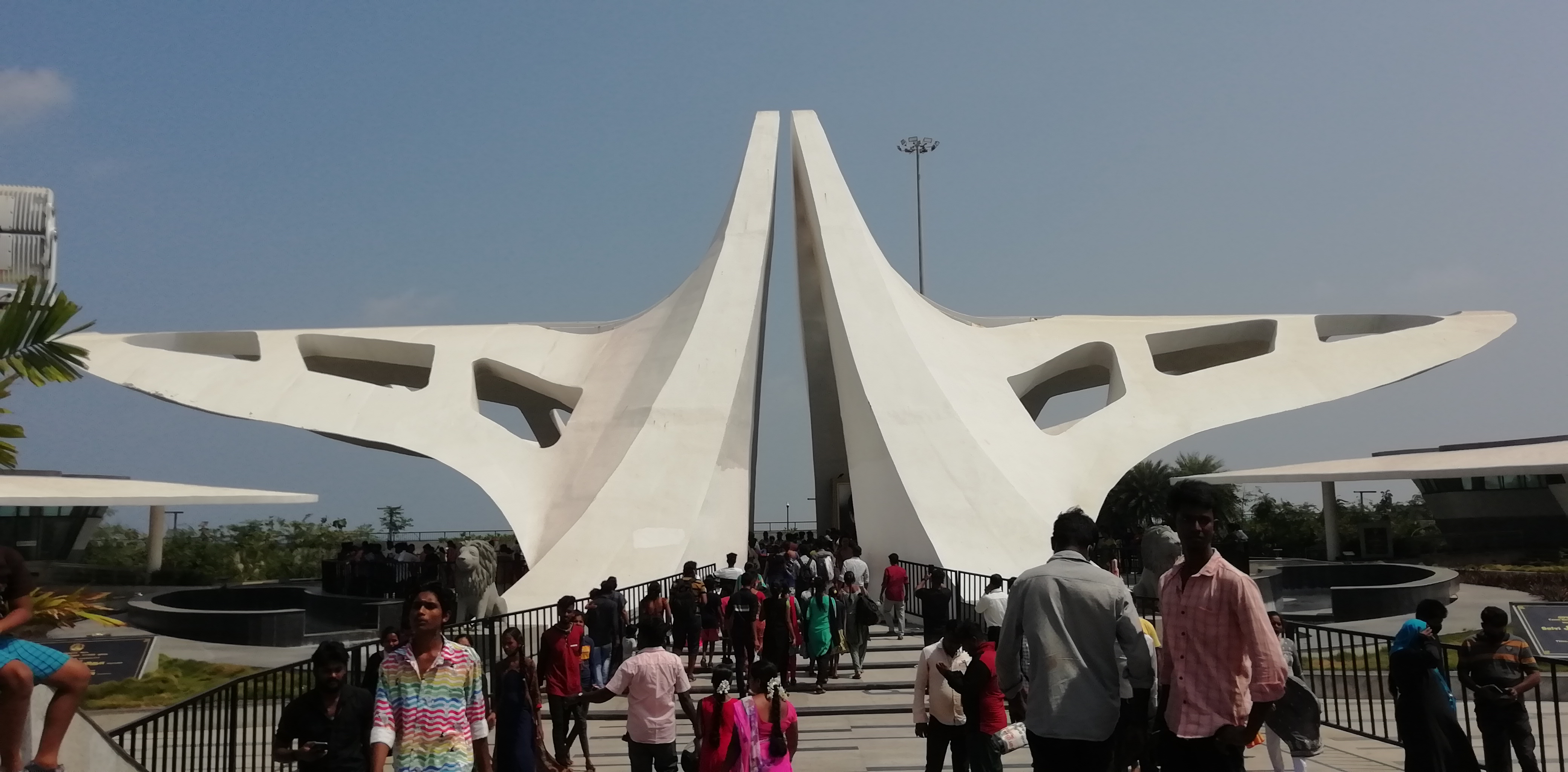
Phoenix-shaped wall houses the Amma Memorial

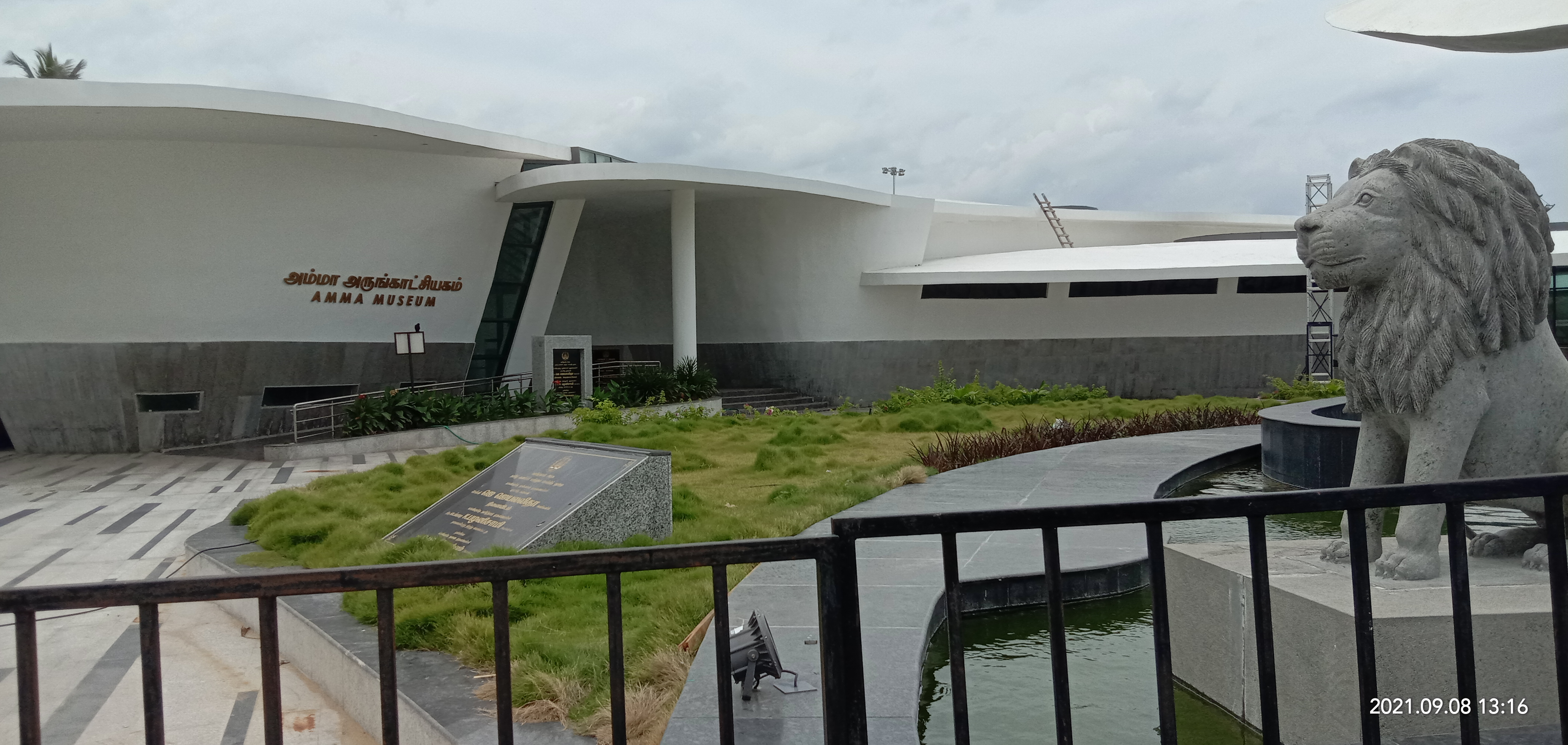
Amma Museum inside the memorial complex

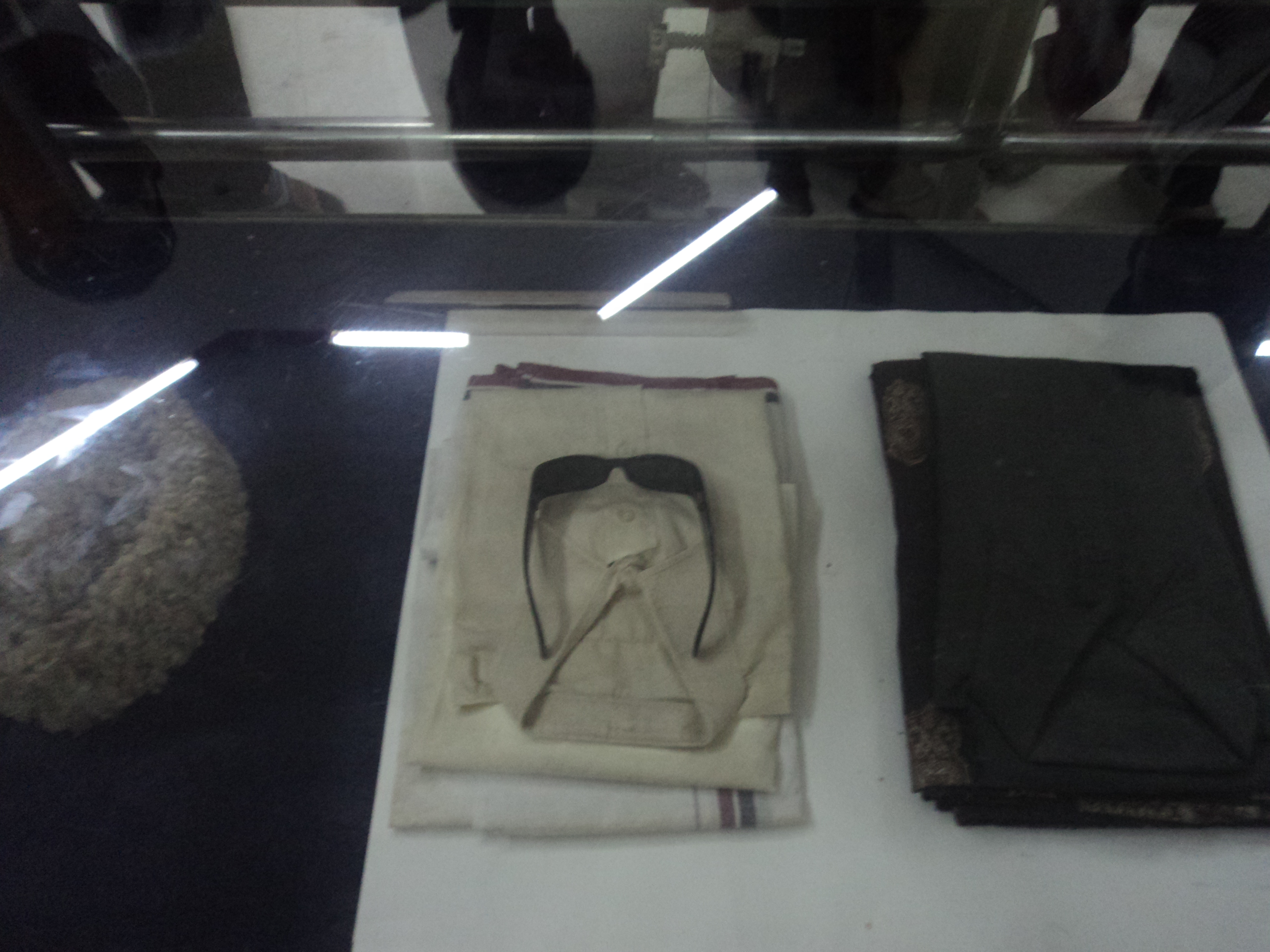
Preserved White Fur Cap, dark glasses, clothing worn by M.G.R.

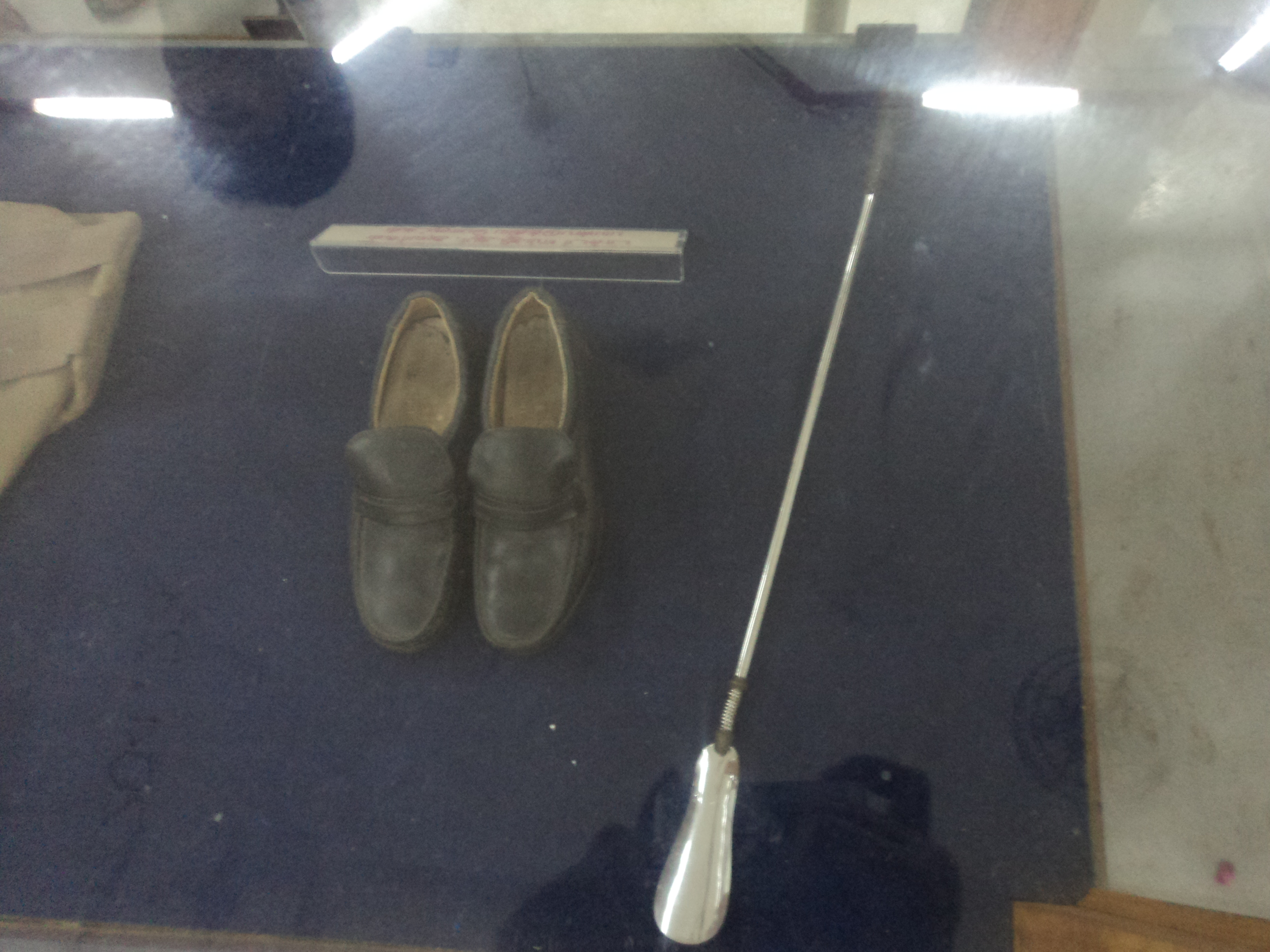
Preserved shoes of M.G.R

== See also ==
- Anna Memorial
- Marina Beach
