= History of rapid transit =

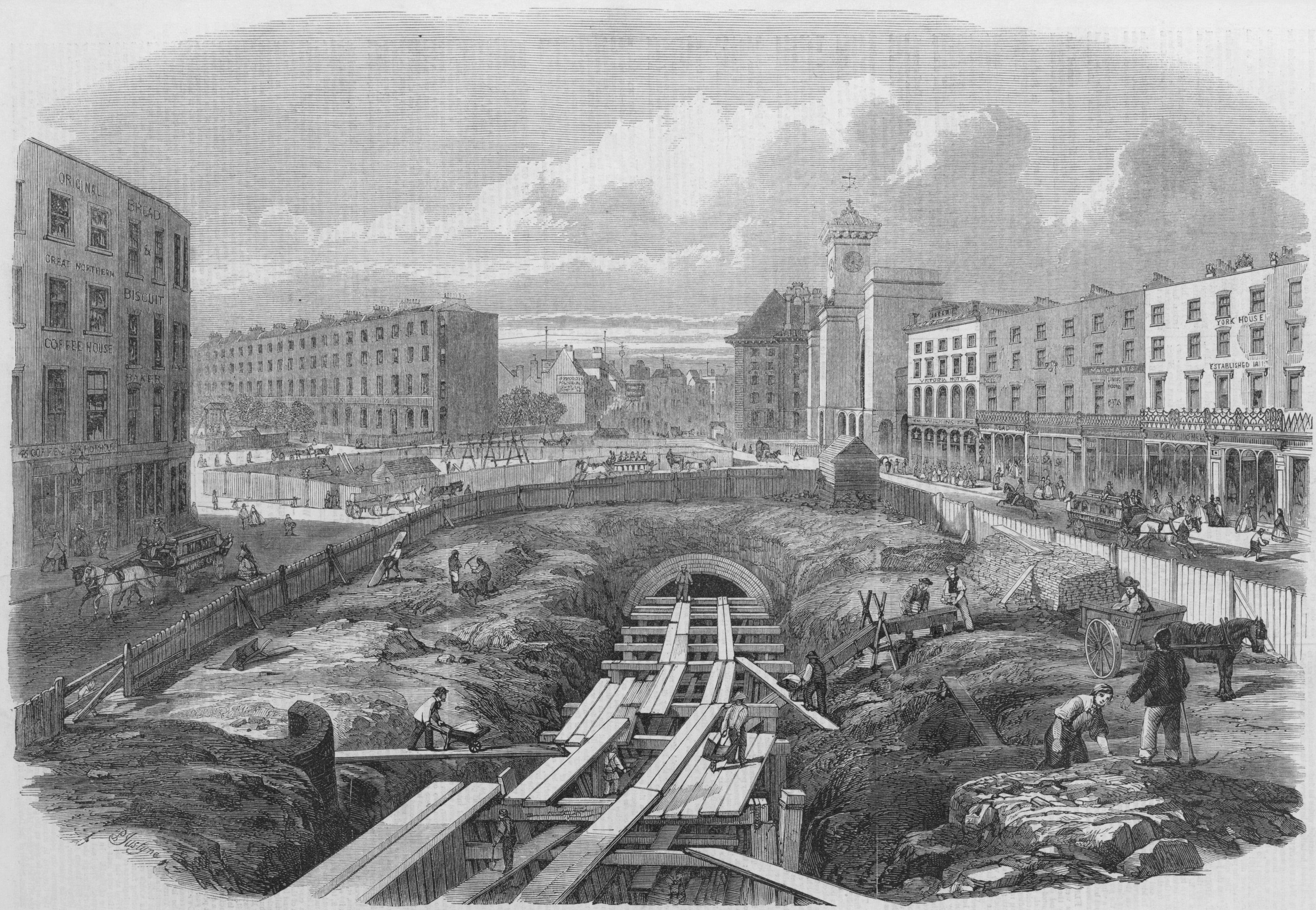
An engraving from the Illustrated London News showing the initial construction stages of London's Metropolitan Railway at King's Cross in 1861.

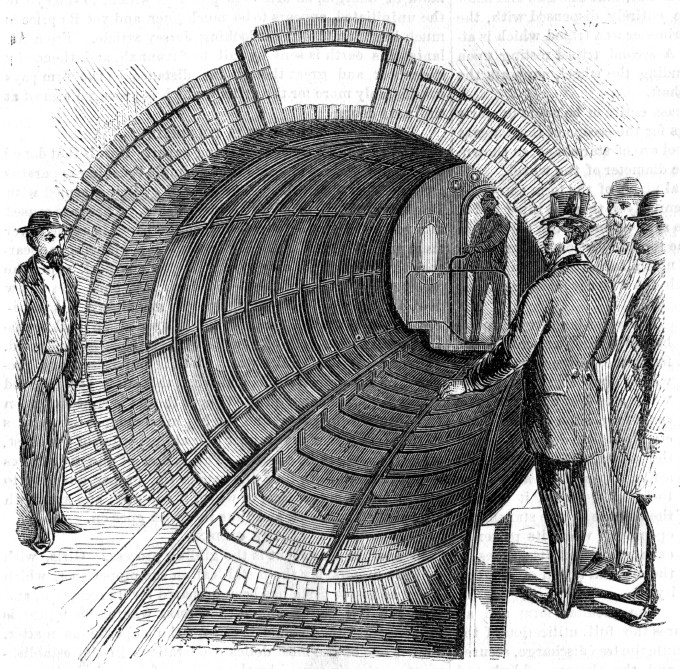
The Beach Pneumatic Transit system was a failed attempt to develop mass transit in New York which occurred in 1870.

The history of rapid transit began in London with the opening of the Metropolitan Railway, which is now part of the London Underground, in 1863. By World War I, electric underground railways were being used in Athens, Berlin, Boston, Buenos Aires, Budapest, Glasgow, Hamburg, Istanbul, Liverpool, New York City, Paris, and Philadelphia.

In the 21st century, China became the world's leader by number of rapid transit systems as well as the fastest growth of such systems, and many other Asian countries began construction of their own rapid transit systems.

== Development ==
While smoke was a major problem for urban railways in tunnels, it was less of a problem in steam-hauled elevated railways, the first of which opened in New York City in 1870. In 1890, London's City & South London Railway used electric traction to overcome the issue of tunnel air quality. Electric traction was more efficient, faster and cleaner than steam and the natural choice for trains running in tunnels and proved superior for elevated services.

=== First tunnels ===
Before any plans were made for transit systems with tunnels and stations, several railway operators had used tunnels for freight and passenger trains, usually to reduce the grade of the railway line. Examples include Trevithick's Tunnel in 1804, built for Wales' Penydarren locomotive, the 1829 Crown Street Tunnel at Liverpool, and the 1.13 mile (1,811 meter)-long 1836 Lime Street Tunnel, also at Liverpool. Part of this tunnel remains in use, making it the world's oldest active tunnel.

The first urban underground railway was London's Metropolitan Railway, which began operations on January 10, 1863. It was built largely in shallow cut and cover tunnels. It was worked by steam trains and despite the creation of numerous vents, was unhealthy and uncomfortable for passengers and operating staff. Smoke collected in the tunnels, leading to proposals to build pneumatic or cable-hauled railways to overcome this problem between 1863 and 1890, though none were successful. Nevertheless, its trains were popular from the start.

While not used for public transit their entire history, St. Louis, Missouri's former mainline tunnels are currently used for rapid transit. Constructed in 1875 they are the oldest in use rapid transit tunnels in North America.

The Metropolitan Railway and the competing Metropolitan District Railway developed the inner circle around central London that was completed in 1884. It featured an extensive system of suburban branches to the northwest (extending into the adjoining countryside), the west, the southwest and the east that was mostly completed by 1904. These systems eventually became part of the London Underground.

=== Electrification ===
In 1890, the first electrified underground urban railway, City and South London Railway, opened. Since the tunnels were tubular, the term "tube" eventually became synonymous with the London Underground. It was originally planned to be cable-hauled, but the company contracted to supply cable-haulage technology went bankrupt. The railway company's authorising act of Parliament, the City of London and Southwark Subway Act 1884 (47 & 48 Vict. c. clxvii), specifically prohibited the use of steam power. This led the City and South to consider electric traction. It operated locomotive-hauled trains with three carriages, initially without windows, because it was thought that passengers would not need to know where they were if they were in tunnels.

The UK's only elevated electric railway opened in 1893 in Liverpool. The Liverpool Overhead Railway was the world's fourth metro system and the world's first fully formed elevated railway to run electric trains from the start. The LOR pioneered electric multiple units of three-car trains. Automatic electric light signals were also a first for the railway. The presence of the "El" helped Liverpool earn the nickname "Britain's North American City". The LOR was demolished in 1957 and Liverpool is served today by a partially underground urban rail network known as Merseyrail, which includes the former Mersey Railway which opened in 1886.

A major breakthrough in the development of electrically driven rapid transit occurred when the American inventor Frank J. Sprague successfully tested his system of multiple-unit train control (MUTC) on the South Side Elevated Railroad (now part of the Chicago 'L') in 1897. MUTC, which allowed all the motors in an entire train to be controlled from a single point, freed rapid transit systems from dependence on locomotive-hauled coaches.

== Early systems ==
=== Europe ===
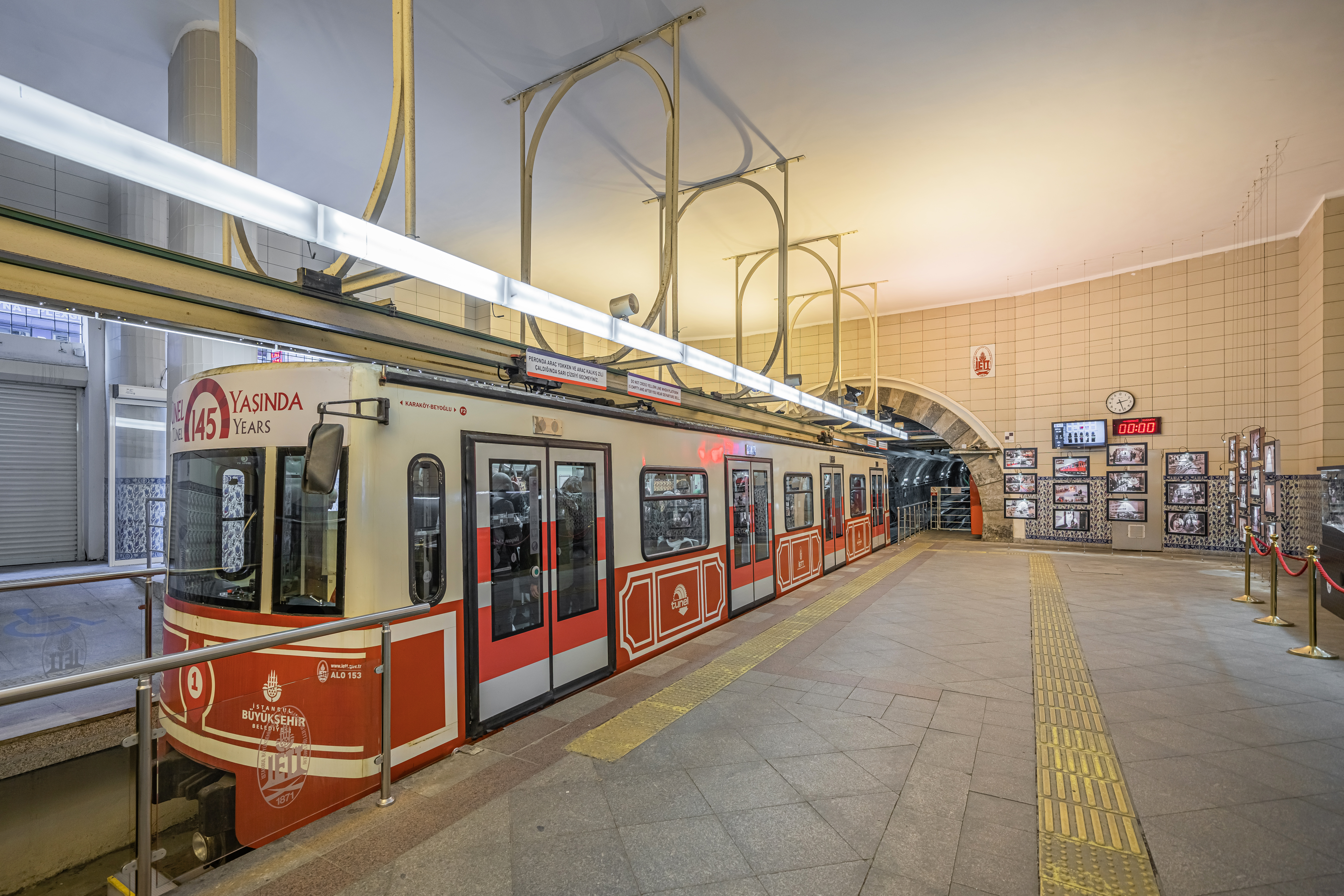
The Tünel is Istanbul's first underground urban funicular railway, which was opened in 1875

Istanbul's Tünel (F2) which was opened in 1875, second-oldest extant subterranean urban rail line in the world, after the London Underground (1863). It is thus the oldest surviving underground urban funicular rail line in continental Europe, as the older 1862 funicular line in Lyon has been converted into an underground road tunnel. It still operating from Beyoğlu to Karaköy with distance 0.5 km (0.3 mi). Istanbul's 1875 Tünel is sometimes described as an early subway system but is actually an underground funicular.

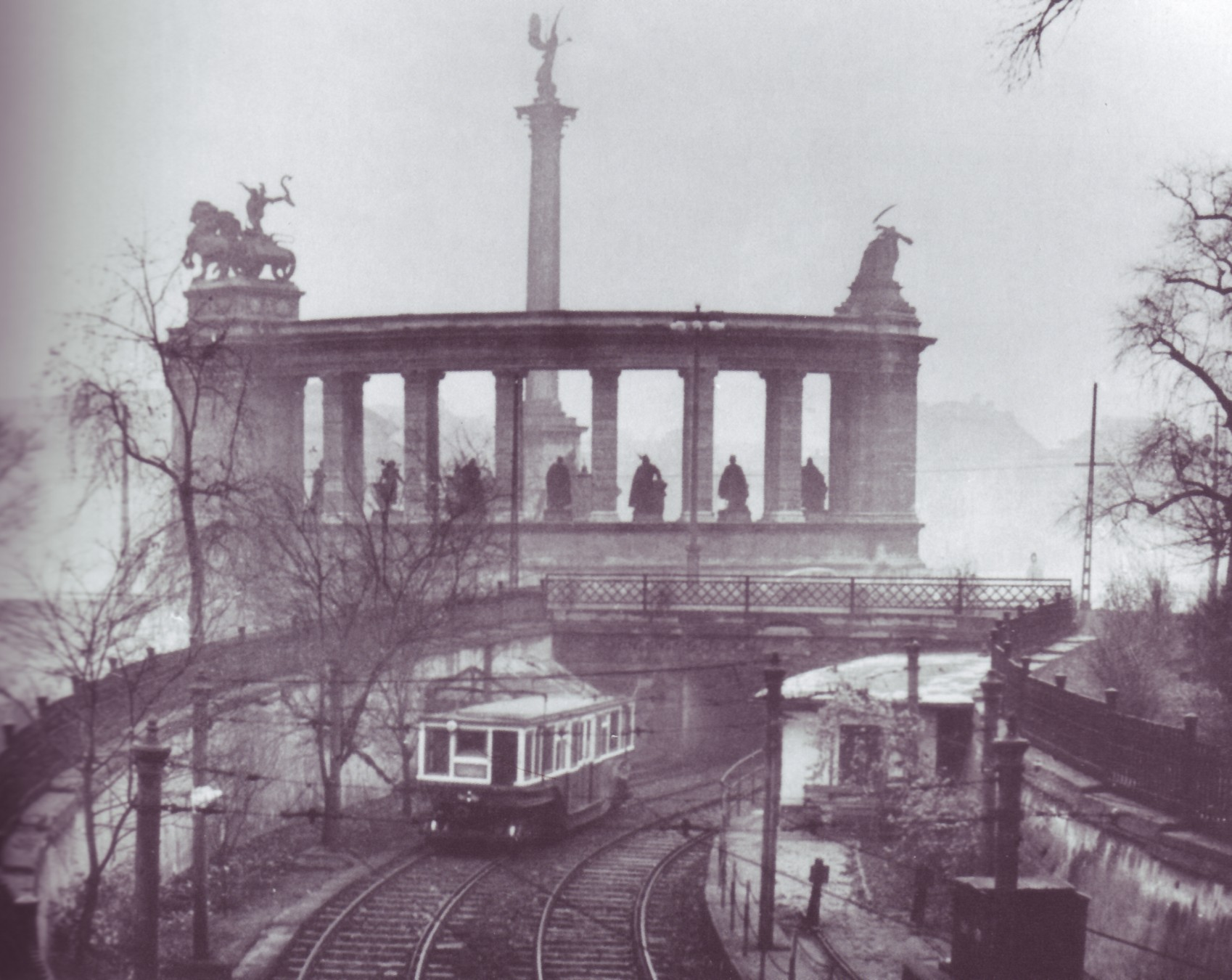
The Budapest M1, at the end of the tunnel at Heroes' square, at its inauguration year in 1896

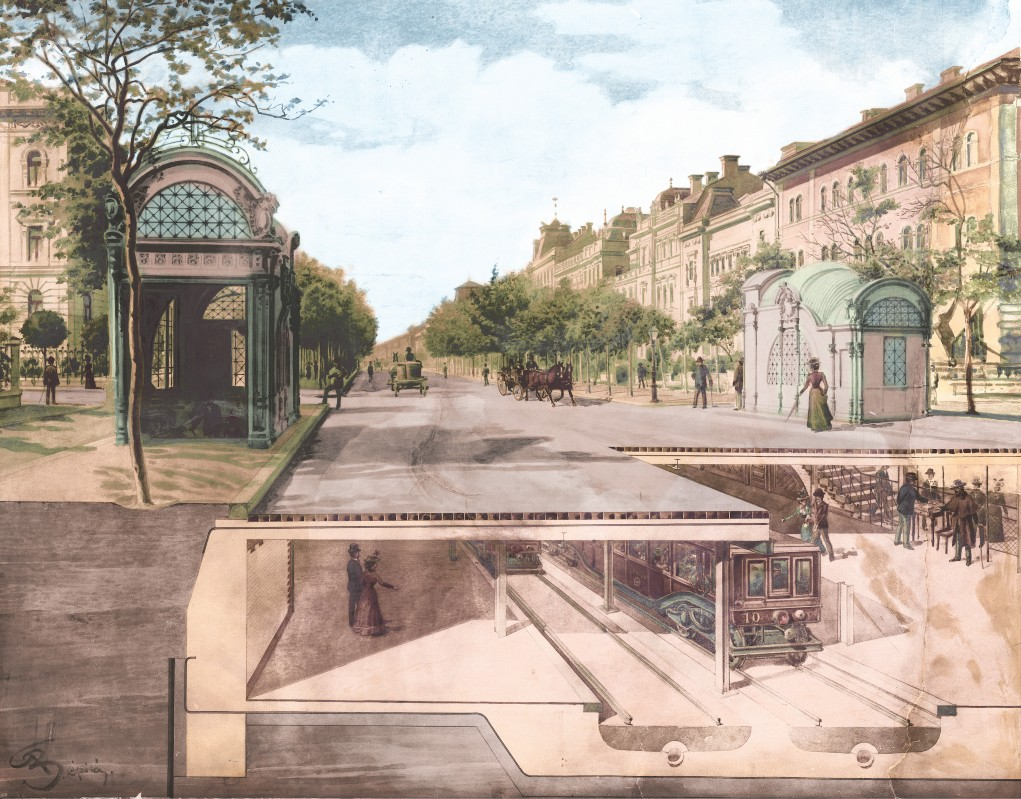
Andrássy Avenue with the Millennium Underground (1896)

Budapest opened the first electrified underground line on the continent, the M1, in 1896. It ran from Gizella tér (now Vörösmarty tér, the city centre) to City Park and the local zoo, a distance of 3.7 kilometres (2.3 mi). It is now part of the Budapest Metro and has largely been restored. The M1 line became an IEEE Milestone due to the radically new innovations in its era: "Among the railway’s innovative elements were bidirectional tram cars; electric lighting in the subway stations and tram cars; and an overhead wire structure instead of a third-rail system for power." Car #18 is preserved at the Seashore Trolley Museum.

The 10.4 kilometres (6.5 mi) Glasgow Subway in Scotland opened the same year and used cable haulage until it was electrified in 1935.

In 1898 the technically already outdated Vienna Metropolitan Railway in Vienna was opened, which was operated by steam trains. Three of the system's five lines were converted to a modern underground railway in 1978, the other two were integrated into Vienna's commuter rail system.

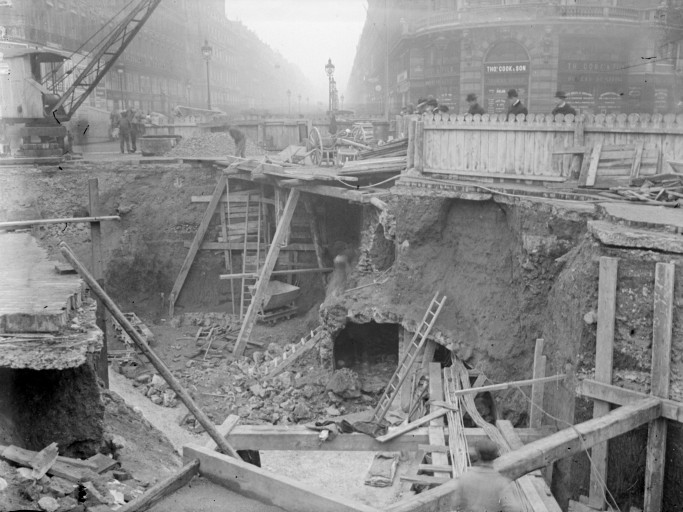
Paris Métro under construction around 1900.

The first line of the Paris Métro opened in 1900. Its full name was the Chemin de Fer Métropolitain, a direct translation into French of London's Metropolitan Railway. The name was shortened to métro, and many other languages have since borrowed this word.

The Berlin U-Bahn (short for Untergrundbahn, underground railway) opened in 1902; because large sections of the line were elevated, it was also called "Hochbahn" (high railway) until the 1920s. Germany's second system, the Hamburg U-Bahn opened in 1912.

The Athens-Piraeus Electric Railway was built as a steam-hauled suburban line in 1869 and acquired an underground section in the capital in 1874. It was electrified in 1904 and became part of the Athens Metro in 2000 as Line 1.The system was completed by the construction of Lines 2 and 3 between 1992 and 2000.

=== North America ===
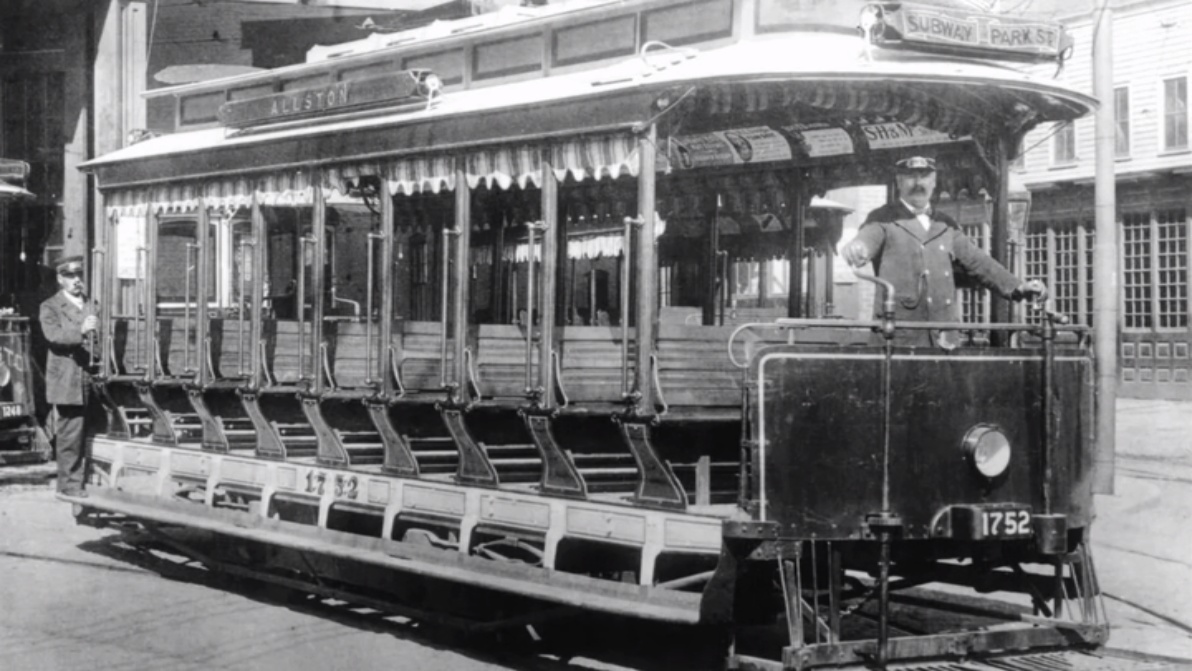
Streetcar number 1752 became the first subway car to be driven in regular traffic in the Boston subway system in 1897. This also marks the beginning of subway traffic in the United States.

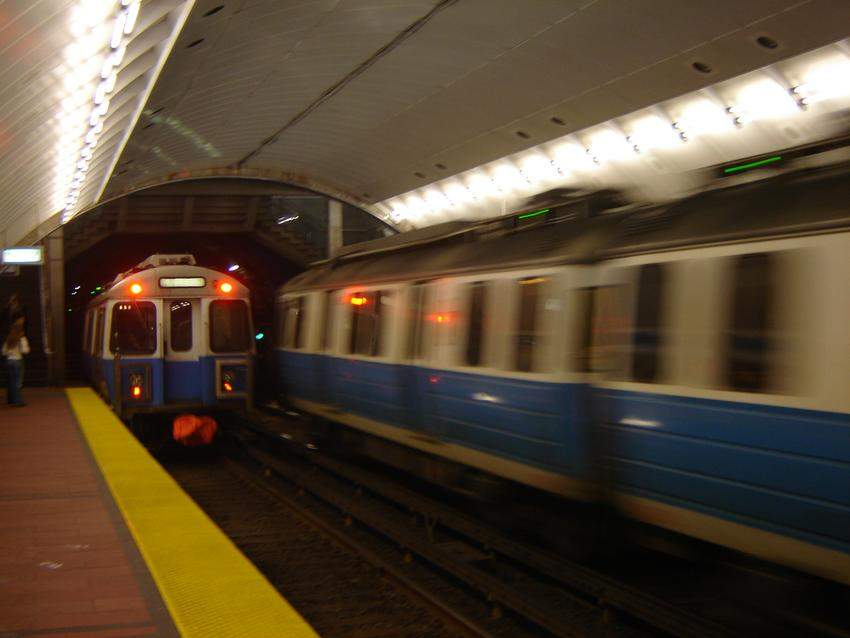
Two MBTA Blue Line trains meet at Aquarium station in Boston Massachusetts.

New York City built its first rapid transit line, the West Side and Yonkers Patent Railway, in 1868. The New York City Subway, which became one of the world's largest rapid transit systems, opened its first section in 1904, a fully independent four-track line stretching 9 miles (14.5 km) from City Hall to 145th Street. Extensions were soon built, reaching the Bronx and Brooklyn; this became part of the IRT system. Two major subway systems, operated by the BMT and the IND were constructed later, and many pre-existing elevated railway lines were incorporated into the BMT and IRT systems. The Hudson and Manhattan Railroad, which opened a subway tunnel in Manhattan in 1908 and connected with New Jersey, remained a separate railroad company, later coming under the control of the Port Authority of New York and New Jersey as the Port Authority Trans-Hudson (PATH). Some New York City Subway lines used right-of-way first used by railroads in the 1870s, and converted R44 subway cars run on the 1860 Staten Island Railway.

The first Chicago L, the South Side Elevated Railroad began operations in 1892, over tracks used by the Green Line over 125 years later. That system is unique for its extensive elevated structures, and several lines do not feature any subway sections.

The Tremont Street Subway was opened in Boston in 1897, becoming the first electrified subway tunnel in North America, and the third-oldest electrified subway tunnel still in use. Initially intended to ease streetcar congestion on Tremont Street, it now forms part of the MBTA Green Line

In 1907, the first line in Philadelphia, now part of the Market–Frankford Line, began running on both elevated and underground structures.

=== South America ===
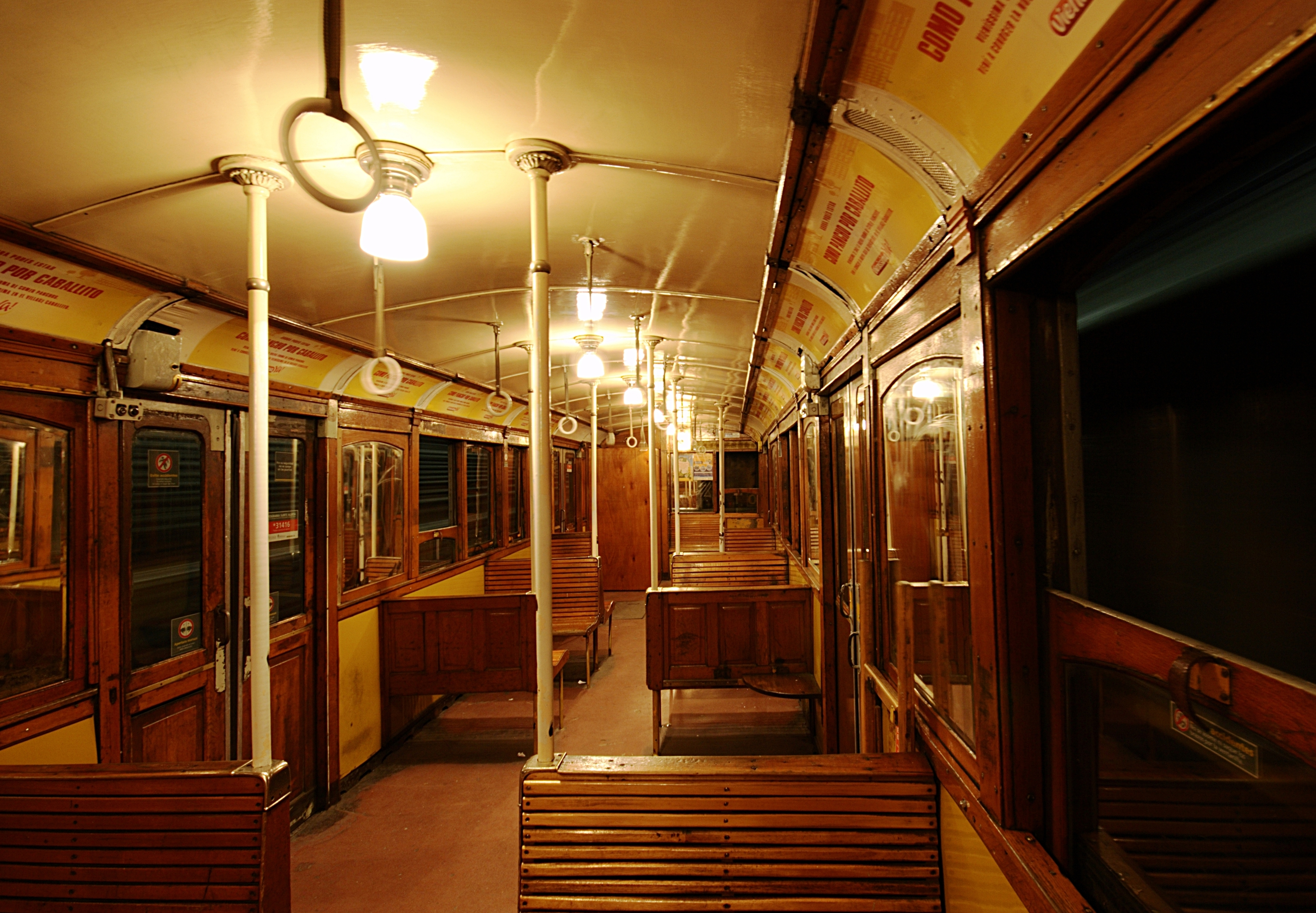
Interior of Buenos Aires vintage Subte Line A cars, in use until 2013.

The oldest subway in the Southern Hemisphere, "Subterráneos de Buenos Aires" (Subte), opened in 1913 as an underground tramway in Buenos Aires, Argentina. Line A of the Subte used La Burgeoise wood and metal carriages, which were in continuous operation for 100 years. In 2013 the cars were replaced with new rolling stock.

== Later systems ==
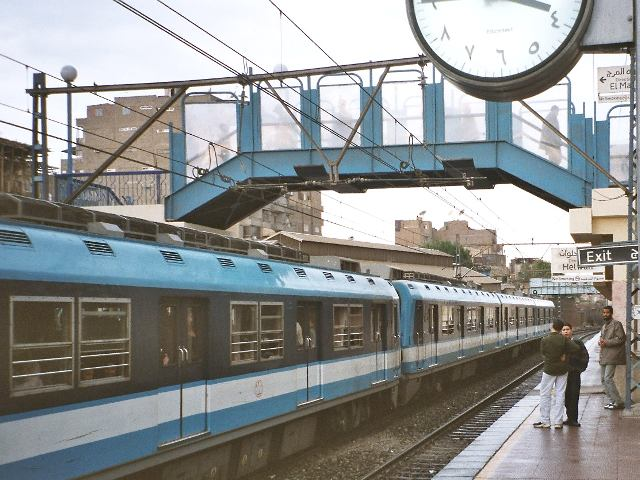
Cairo Metro

=== Africa ===
Cairo was the first African city with a metro system (opened 1987), which was partly converted from a railway line. It is under development. The second African metro opened in Algiers in November 2011. Tunis has a tram system that is referred to as a métro léger (meaning "light rail") despite not being rapid transit. Lagos and Abidjan are two other African cities that are also building metro networks.

=== Asia ===
==== East Asia ====
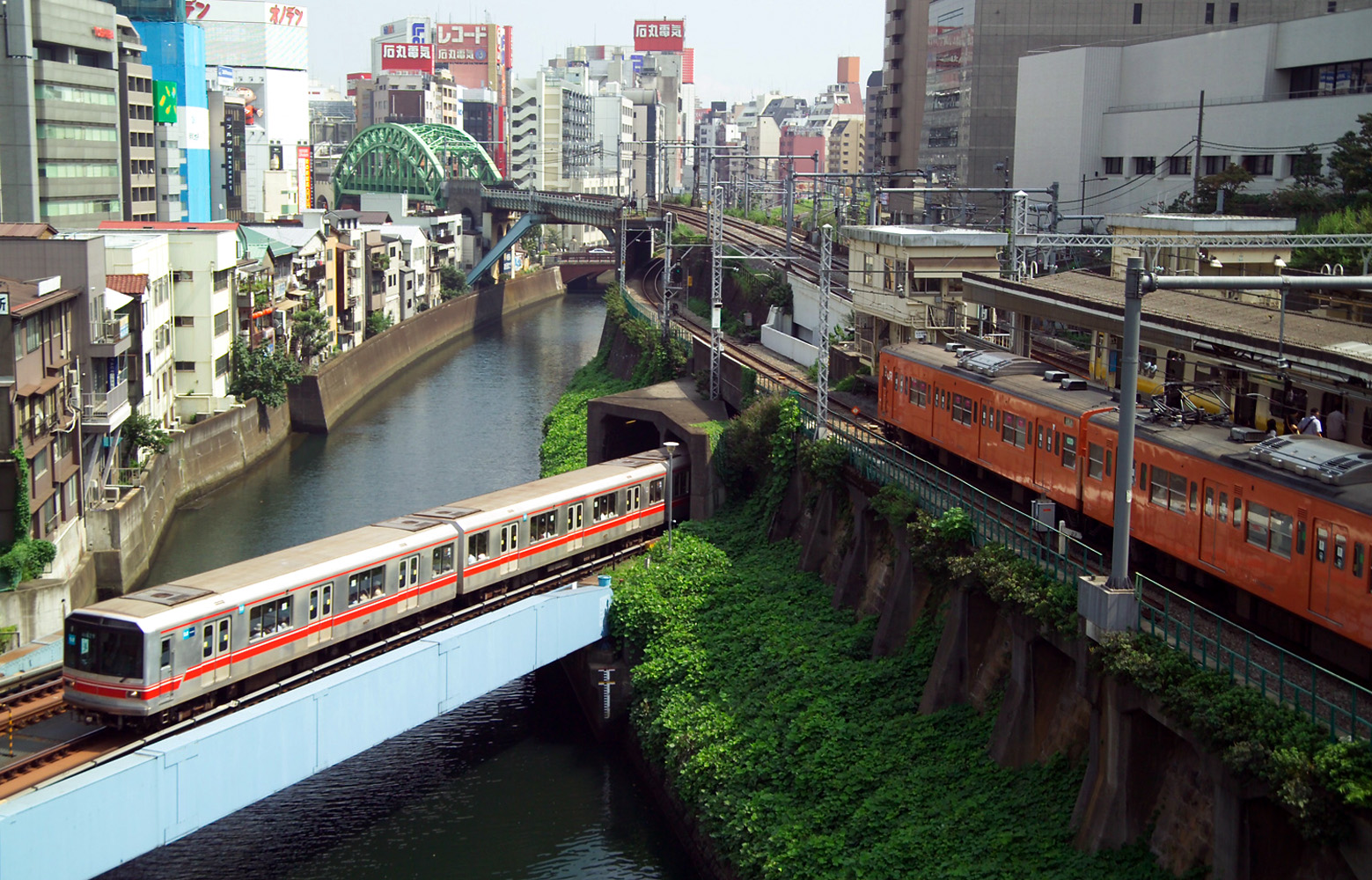
A Tokyo subway train emerges from the tunnel as a commuter-rail train boards passengers at Ochanomizu Station.

Asia's first cities to have subway lines were Tokyo in 1927 and Osaka in 1933. Other major Japanese cities with subway systems are Yokohama, Sapporo, Kobe, Kyoto, Fukuoka, Nagoya and Sendai.

The first of many China's metro systems, Beijing subway, began operation in 1971. Other major cities followed: Tianjin (1984), Shanghai (1993), Guangzhou (1997), Wuhan (2004), Shenzhen (2004). Nearly sixty cities have or are planning rapid transit systems and new Chinese metro systems open every year.

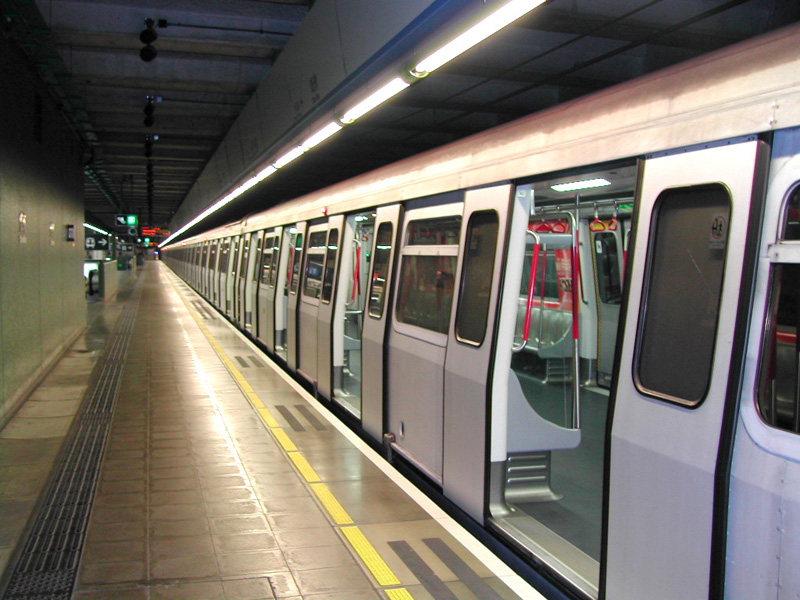
The MTR of Hong Kong

In 1979, Hong Kong's subway line, the MTR, began operations. It operates 10 lines, including four that run underneath Victoria Harbour. By 1982, the British Section of the Kowloon-Canton Railway, known later as KCR East Rail and now MTR's East Rail Line, started to provide metro-like service as electrification was completed. In 2007 the merger of the KCR line into the MTR system was completed.

Since 1974, South Korean cities have developed subway systems. The first lines were converted from existing heavy railway lines. The largest, Seoul, operates twelve lines extending approximately 314 km. Busan, Daegu, Incheon, Daejeon and Gwangju also have subway systems. Seoul and Incheon are connected by metro.

Pyongyang in North Korea notably has a well adorned and deep metro with non-geographical names of stations (unique in the world) and was built to serve as a bomb shelter in case of a war.

In 1996, Taiwan opened its first metro system in Taipei. A second metro system opened in Kaohsiung in 2008.

==== South Asia ====
India's oldest metro is in Calcutta (now Kolkata), which opened in 1984. the Kolkata Metro is the first planned and proposed rapid transit system of Asia, first proposed in 1919. Followed by the elevated rapid transit system, the Chennai MRTS. Delhi, Mumbai, Bengaluru, Chennai, Kochi, Hyderabad, Nagpur, Jaipur, Pune and Ahemdabad built metros afterwards. Cities such as Navi Mumbai are constructing metros. Patna and other cities have hired engineers and civil planners to plan the locations of future metro lines.

The Lahore Metro in Lahore, Pakistan opened in October 2020 with one line running south west–north east. It was the first automated and driverless rapid transit system in South Asia. The network currently has 26 stations (2 underground and 24 elevated) and is 27 kilometres long and is the first rapid transit line in Pakistan. Other lines of Lahore Metro are also planned.

Bangladesh also inaugurated the metro in Dhaka, the first phase of Dhaka Metro's MRT Line 6 on December 28, 2022, making metro services available to the public for the first time in the country.

==== Southeast Asia ====
Manila's LRT ( Light Rail Transit ) is the oldest rapid transit system in South East Asia and the Philippines, opening in 1984. The system originally used light rail vehicles but had the characteristics of a RTS (Rapid Transit System) and was later upgraded to a medium capacity system in 1999, and continues to upgrade today.

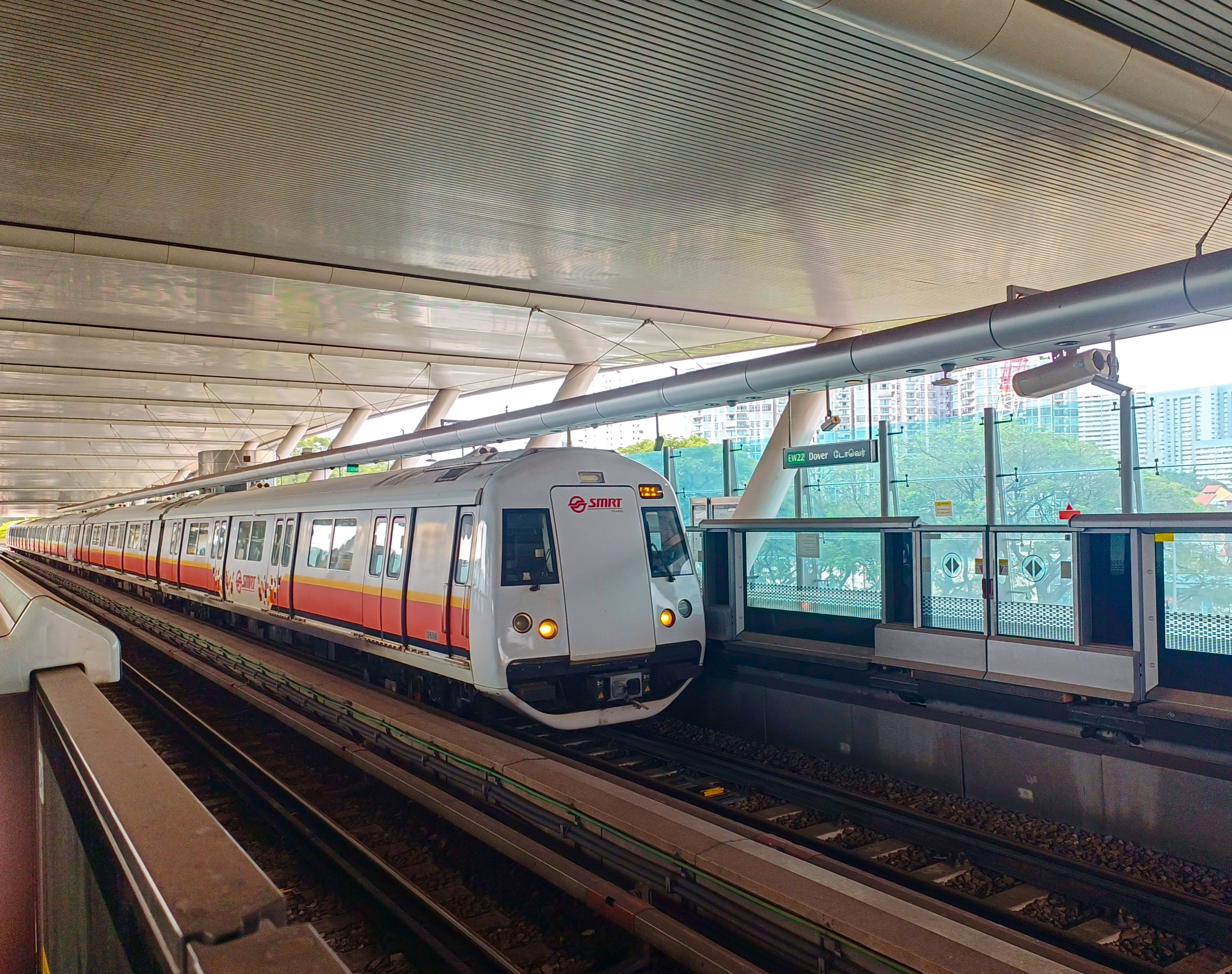
Singapore MRT

In 1987, Mass Rapid Transit in Singapore opened. It was the world's first heavy rail system to feature platform screen doors on its underground stations. The network operates six lines with two more lines planned to open by 2030.

Kuala Lumpur's light rapid transit system consists of 2 lines, the Ampang and Sri Petaling lines which opened in 1996 and the Kelana Jaya line which opened in 1998. On 16 December 2016, Phase 1 of the MRT SBK line opened from Sungai Buloh to Semantan while Phase 2 from Semantan to Kajang opened on 17 July 2017. All MRT stations and the underground stations of the LRT Kelana Jaya line feature platform screen doors . Currently, the second line of the MRT, the SSP line is under construction and is scheduled to be opened on 2021 (Phase 1 - Sungai Buloh to Kampung Batu) and 2022 (Phase 2 - Kampung Batu to Putrajaya Sentral).

The Jakarta MRT in Jakarta, Indonesia opened in March 2019 with one line running north–south. Phase 2 of the MRT is set to open around 2024 and is currently under construction, which will extend the current line further north, while phase 4 is currently being planned out. The network currently 13 stations (6 underground and 7 elevated) and is the first rapid transit line in Indonesia.

The BTS Skytrain opened in Bangkok, Thailand in 1999, following the Bangkok MRT, which opened in 2004.

In Vietnam, the first rapid transit service, called Hanoi Metro, opened in 2021 in Hanoi with two lines. Three years later, in 2024, Ho Chi Minh City Metro opened with one line in Ho Chi Minh City.

==== West Asia ====
Haifa, Israel opened an underground funicular railway in 1959, the Carmelit. At a narrow section of the Jerusalem Light Rail (since 2011), the road was tunneled rather than the rail. Sections of the Tel Aviv Light Rail (under construction) are underground. Not all three systems are heavy rail.

Iran built its first metro network in Tehran in 1999, its second in Mashad, finished in 2011. Five more networks in Iranian cities are to be constructed.

In 2009 UAE built an elevated metro in Dubai, one of the most modern in the world to be followed by metros that are planned in Abu Dhabi and Sharjah.

In Mecca, Saudi Arabia, a 20 km first line of ground and elevated metro system was completed in 2010. A total of 5 metro lines with long trains are planned to carry residents around Mecca. Another metro, the Riyadh Metro, opened on 1 December 2024. Other metro systems are planned in Jeddah, Madinah, and Dammam.

Istanbul in Turkey built its metro in 1989. Other systems built in Turkey include, Ankara (1997), Izmir (2000), Bursa (2002), and Adana (2009).

=== Europe ===
==== Spain ====
In the interwar period, the first metros were established at the continent's periphery: The Madrid Metro opened on October 17, 1919 under the direction of the Compañía de Metro Alfonso XIII. Metro stations served as air raid shelters during the Spanish Civil War. Today, Madrid's subway is one of the longest systems in the world. Barcelona Metro followed in 1924.

==== Portugal ====
In 1959, a metro opened in Lisbon, called Metropolitano de Lisboa. It was the first underground rail system in the Portuguese-speaking world.

==== Post Soviet States ====
In 1935, the Soviet Union built its first metro in Moscow. Other systems in the post-Soviet States include Saint Petersburg (1955), Kiev (1960), Tbilisi (1966), Baku (1967), Kharkov (1975), Tashkent (1977), Yerevan (1981), Minsk (1984), Nizhny Novgorod (1985), Novosibirsk (1986), Samara (1987), and Yekaterinburg (1991), Almaty (2011).

==== United Kingdom ====
In 1980, the second underground metro system in England, named the Tyne and Wear Metro, opened to serve Newcastle-upon-Tyne.

=== North America ===
==== Canada ====
The Toronto Subway opened in 1954. One experimental trainset used the first aluminum subway cars, which reduced weight and therefore operating costs. With the next car order in 1963, only aluminum was used. The new cars, at 75 feet/23 m, were at the time the longest in the world. The Montreal Metro, was the second subway system in Canada and was opened in 1966 as part of Expo 67 that would be held in Montreal.

==== United States ====
Bay Area Rapid Transit (BART) in the San Francisco Bay Area and Metropolitan Atlanta Rapid Transit Authority (MARTA) both opened in 1972, and the capital's Washington Metro in Washington, D.C. in 1976 as part of changing attitudes towards transportation in the United States. The following decades saw renewed interest in rapid transit access and expansion. Baltimore and Miami both opened single-line rapid transit systems in the 1980s (Miami has since expanded with an additional line).

The most recently constructed fully underground heavy rail metro system in the continental United States is the Los Angeles Metro B and D Lines in Los Angeles, which originally opened as the two-branched Red Line in 1993. The main line (the B line) runs from Union Station in downtown Los Angeles to North Hollywood in the San Fernando Valley. In autumn 2005, several politicians including Los Angeles mayor Antonio Villaraigosa indicated a desire to complete the originally conceived subway route along Wilshire Boulevard to West Los Angeles and Santa Monica; the D Line Extension (after the branch's former color indicator) is under construction and planned to open in phases until 2027. Most options for completing the Sepulveda Transit Corridor line involve new fully separated heavy rail rapid transit service.

Tren Urbano serves the island of Puerto Rico in and around the capital of San Juan. It is the Caribbean's first rapid transit system, opening in 2004

=== Oceania ===
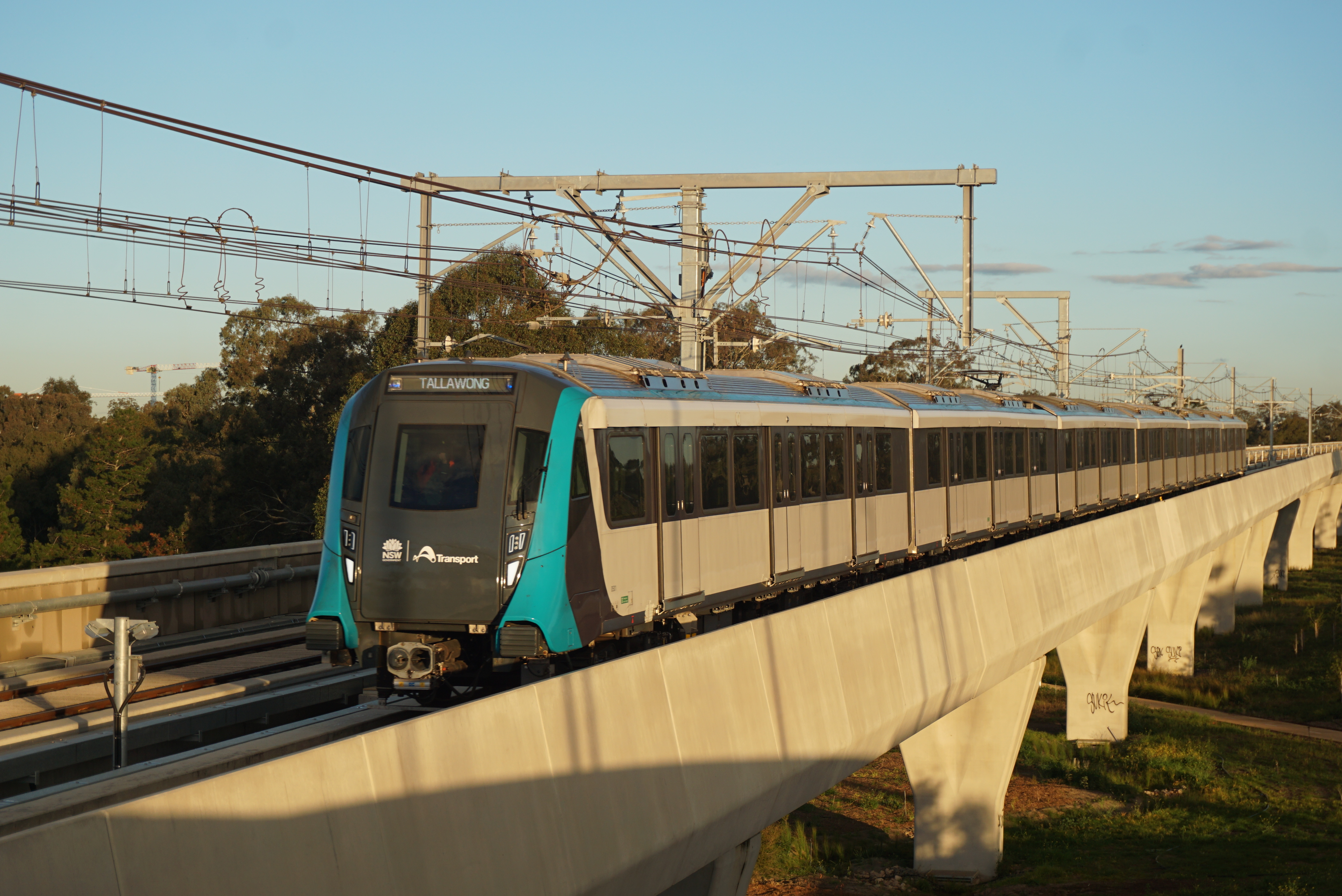
Sydney Metro

The five largest Australian cities have suburban railway networks, but all except Perth have long-distance passenger and/or freight traffic on some lines. Transperth services operate at 5-minute frequency over two suburban-passenger only lines from 2–6 pm, which was the highest frequency of services until the opening of the Sydney Metro in 2019.

In New Zealand, the City Rail Link started construction in 2016, following decades of planning and debate.

=== South America ===
==== Brazil ====
In Brazil, the first underground rapid transit service opened in 1974 in São Paulo, and now the Metrô carries some 4 million passengers on an average weekday. Part of it consists of converted older railways; with stations dating back to the 1880s. Underground lines have been built in Rio de Janeiro, Belo Horizonte, Recife, Porto Alegre and in the Federal District, serving the federal capital Brasília and its immediate surroundings.

==== Chile ====
Metro de Santiago is the metro system serving Santiago, the capital of the Republic of Chile. It is a network of five lines with a total of 85 stations, and the only South American rubber tired metro.

==== Colombia ====
Medellín, Colombia is served by one of the few profitable metro systems in the world. Operated by the Metro de Medellin Company, it carries fewer than 500,000 passengers a day. This system operates on an elevated infrastructure in the downtown area and on-level parallel to the river. The construction of the system had astronomical cost overruns that led to a large public debt.

== See also ==
- History of trams
- Interurban
- Light rail
