= Metrohan Building =

- Metrohan Binası
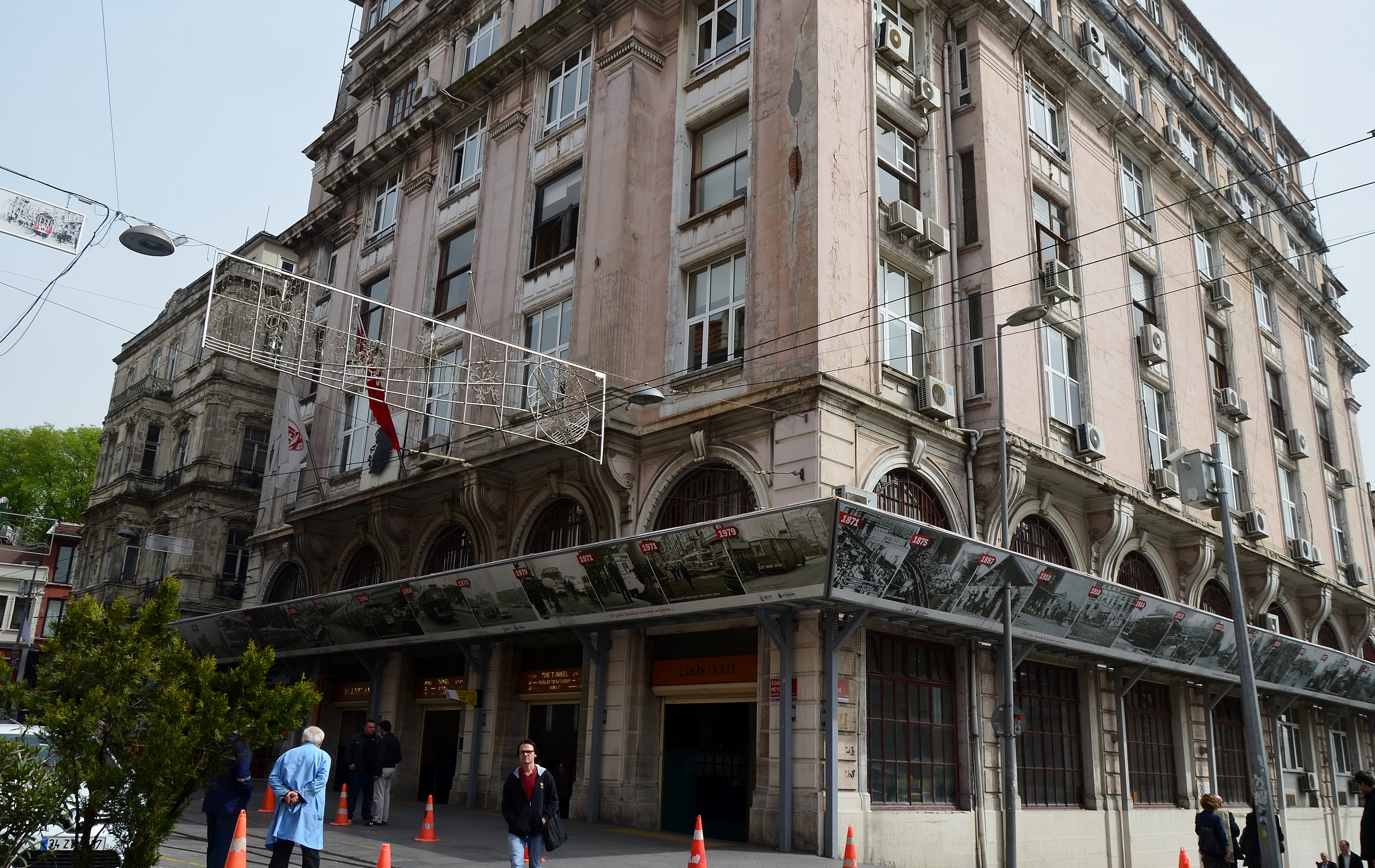
- The Metrohan Building and the entrance to the Beyoğlu station of the Tünel at its ground floor
- Interactive map of the Metrohan Building area
- Alternative names: Beyoğlu İstasyon Binası

General information
- Status: Completed
- Type: Office building
- Location: Erkan-i Harp Sk. 2, Şahkulu Mah., 34425, Beyoğlu, Istanbul, Turkey
- Coordinates: 41.02837771°N 28.97411493°E
- Elevation: 72 m (236 ft)
- Current tenants: IETT
- Named for: Tünel
- Construction started: 1912
- Opened: 1914

Technical details
- Floor count: 7

Design and construction
- Architect: Mikayel Nurican

The Metrohan Building (Turkish: Metrohan Binası) is a 7-story office building in Beyoğlu, Istanbul. The building was built between 1912 and 1914. The ground floor of the building contains the Beyoğlu Tünel station, which is the northern terminus of the historic 573 m (1,880 ft) long funicular railway. The building gets its name from the railway itself; as Metro Han can be translated to Metro House or Metro Building.

== History ==
When Beyoğlu station was under construction between 1871 and 1874, plans to construct a 5-story hotel building above the station were drawn out by chief engineer of the project, Eugène-Henri Gavand. However, when Gavand's shares in the railway were bought out, his plans for a hotel were also scrapped.

The ground floor of the Metrohan building was the original Beyoğlu station structure, which opened in 1875. The original structure consisted of a wooden A-frame roof on top of the ground floor stone structure that exists today. In 1911, a Belgium company SOFINA bought the operating rights of the railway and needed a central office in Istanbul, known at the time as Constantinople. Plans to build a 6-story office building on top of Beyoğlu station were drawn up in Charleroi, Belgium by Turkish-Armenian architect Mikayel Nurican and construction began in 1912. The original office building consisted of 4 floors (including the ground floor) with a smaller 2-story tower at the top. The building was completed in 1914 and became the headquarters of Tünel operations. In 1928, the 2-story tower was expanded as 2 extra floors and a 7th floor was constructed on top, bringing the building to its current height and shape. Istanbul Elektrik, Tramvay ve Tünel İşletmeleri (I.E.T.T.) bought the Tünel railway as well as the Metrohan building and began using it as their own general headquarters. IETT kept their headquarters in the building until 1983, when they moved to a newer building on top of Karaköy station. The building is currently undergoing restoration by the Istanbul municipal government to be repurposed into a public exhibition space and library.

== See also ==
- Beyoğlu (Tünel) - the railway station located within the Metrohan Building
