= Events in rail transport =

There are multiple articles and lists related to events in rail transport, including:

== Prose articles ==
- History of rail transport
- History of rapid transit
- History of trams

== Lists ==
- Timeline of railway history, a list of the most significant events
- List of years in rail transport, an index to lists of events organised by year of occurrence
- Rail transport by country, an index to articles organised geographically
- Lists of rail accidents
- List of tram accidents

== See also ==
- Category:History of rail transport
