= Beyoğlu (Tünel) =

Station on the Tünel railway in Beyoğlu, Istanbul

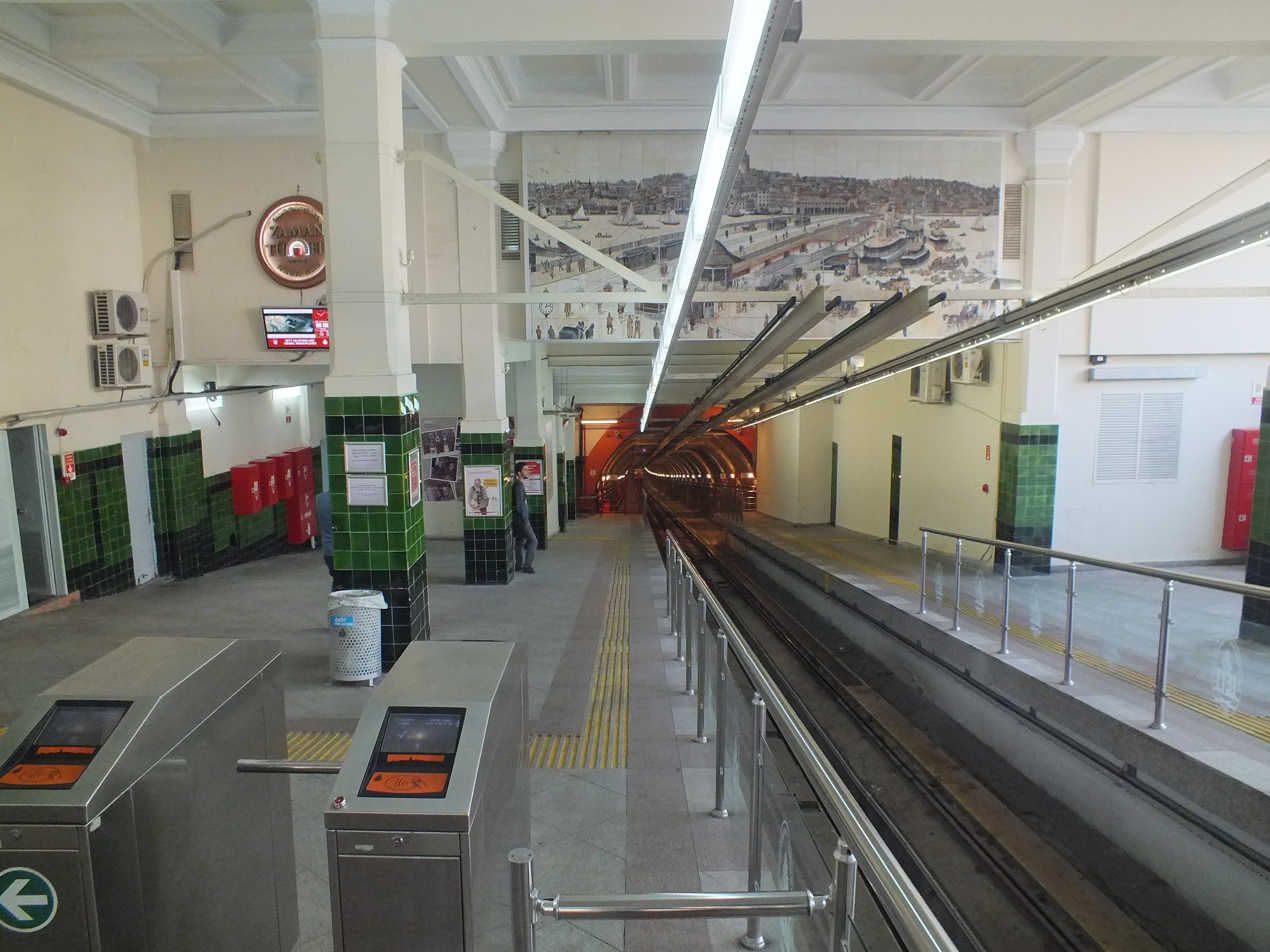
- Looking south with a train visible in the tunnel.

General information
- Location: Tünel Meydanı 3, Şahkulu Mah., 34421; Beyoğlu, Istanbul; Turkey
- Coordinates: 41.028469°N 28.974041°E
- Owner: Istanbul Metropolitan Municipality
- Line: Tünel
- Platforms: 1 bay platform
- Tracks: 1
- Connections: Istanbul Metro: M2 at Şişhane; Heritage tram İETT Bus: 32T, 35C, 36T, 38T, 46Ç, 46E, 46H, 46T, 47, 47A, 47Ç, 47E, 47K, 47N, 50E, 50G, 50N, 54E, 54HT, 54TE, 55G, 55T, 66, 69A, 70FE, 70FY, 70KY, 71AT, 71T, 72T, 72YT, 73, 73F, 74, 74A, 76D, 77, 77A, 77Ç, 79T, 80T, 83O, 85T, 87, 89C, 89T, 92T, 93T, 97BT, 97T, 145T, E-56, E-59, EM1, EM2; Istanbul Minibus: Şişhane-Şişli, Şişhane-Yunus Emre Mahallesi, Şişhane - İsfanbul AVM, Şişhane - İmar Blokları; Istanbul Dolmuş: Taksim-Aksaray, Taksim-Bakırköy, Taksim-Cevizlibağ, Taksim-Florya, Taksim-Kocamustafapaşa, Taksim-Topkapı, Taksim-Yenibosna, Taksim-Yeşilköy

Construction
- Structure type: Underground
- Accessible: Yes

History
- Opened: 17 January 1875
- Rebuilt: 1971
- Former names: Pera

Passengers
- 2017: 15,068 (Average daily ridership)

Services
Preceding station	İETT	Following station
Terminus	F2	Karaköy Terminus
Track layout
Location

Beyoğlu is a station on the historic Tünel funicular railway in Beyoğlu, Istanbul. Located on Tünel Square, near İstiklal Avenue, it is the northern and upper terminus of the 573 m (1,880 ft) railway. The station is located on the ground floor of the Metrohan Building, which serves as an administrative office building for the IETT.

== Overview ==
Beyoğlu station is located at street level on the ground floor of the Metrohan Building. The entrance is located on the northern side of the building on Tünel Square. Despite being at-grade, the track and platforms are at an angle facing into the ground and the tunnel begins where the two platforms end. The Spanish solution is used at Beyoğlu, as one platform is for boarding passengers, while the other is for exiting passengers only. The station is integrated within the citywide smartcard system, Istanbulkart and turnstiles are located at the front entrance.

Connection to the İstiklal Avenue heritage tram line, to Taksim Square, is available just outside the station. About two blocks away is the İstiklal Avenue entrance to the Şişhane metro station on the M2 line of the Istanbul Metro. Since Beyoğlu is located within a mostly pedestrian area, no immediate connection to city buses is available. The closest bus stop is located about 300 m (980 ft) west on Refik Saydam Avenue.

== History ==
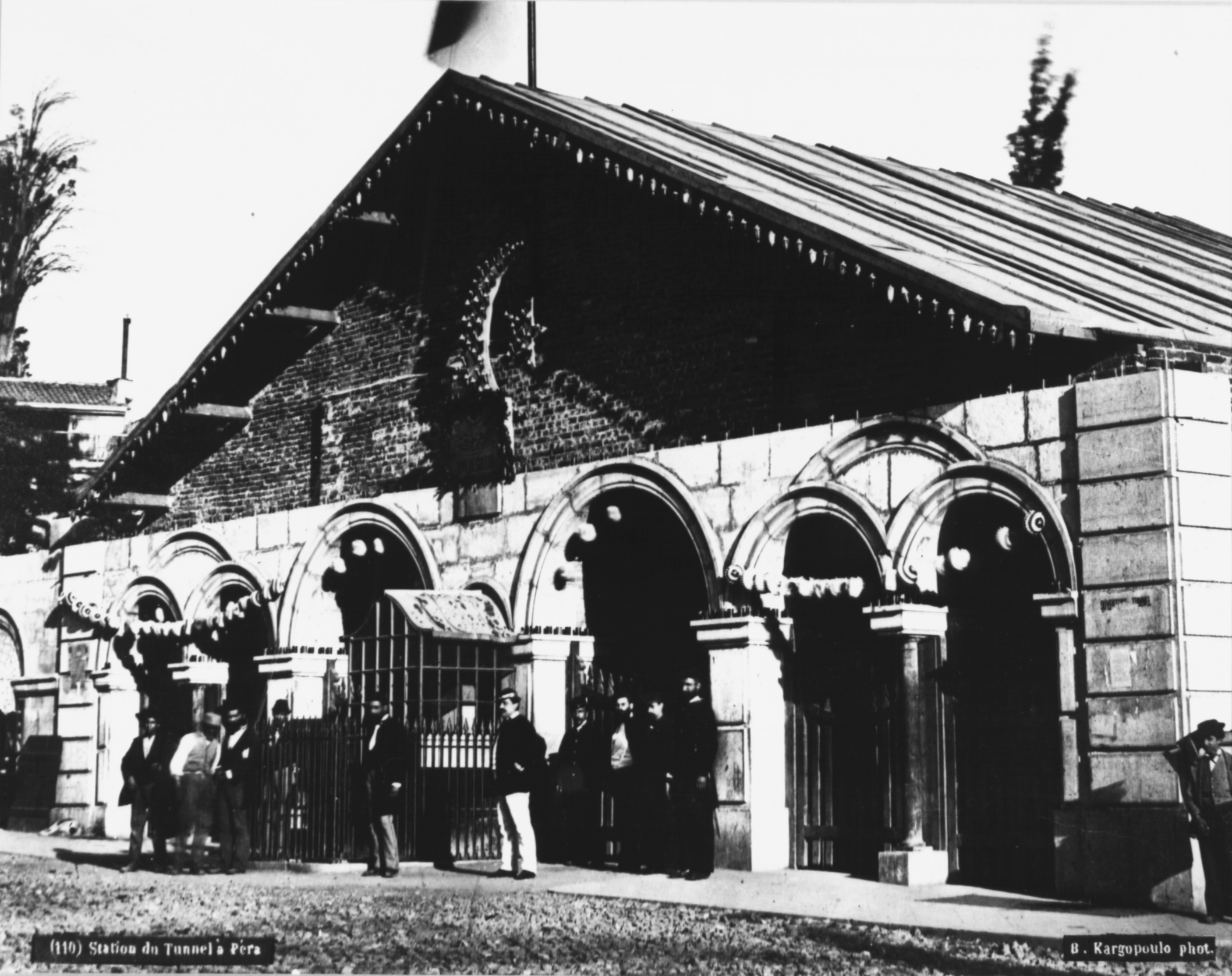
The original 1875 Beyoğlu station building.

Beyoğlu station, along with its counterpart Karaköy station, is one of the oldest subterranean urban railway stations in the world. Construction began in the summer of 1871 and was completed in 1874, along with the rest of the railway line. Beyoğlu station officially opened, along with Tünel, on 17 January 1875 as Pera station. A 5-story hotel building designed by the chief engineer of Tünel, Eugène-Henri Gavand, was originally planned to be constructed on top of Beyoğlu station. This was never realized and the station building remained a 2-story structure until 1914, when the Metrohan Building was constructed above it.

Beyoğlu station, along with Tünel, was taken over by the IETT, which continued operating the railway. In 1968, the station was closed down temporarily for the modernisation and electrification of the railway line. Once works completed, the station reopened on 2 November 1971. In 1990, the IETT opened a 1.6 km (0.99 mi) long heritage tram line along İstiklal Avenue, which had its southwestern terminus just outside of Beyoğlu station. Connection to the Istanbul Metro became available in 2009, when Şişhane station opened.

== Nearby places of interest ==
- İstiklâl Avenue - A landmark street of Istanbul with many cafes, restaurants, shops and museums.
- Galata Tower - A historic stone tower built in 1348.
- Pera Museum - An art museum
- Galip Dede Avenue - The street running parallel to the Tünel line from Beyoğlu to Karaköy.

== Gallery ==
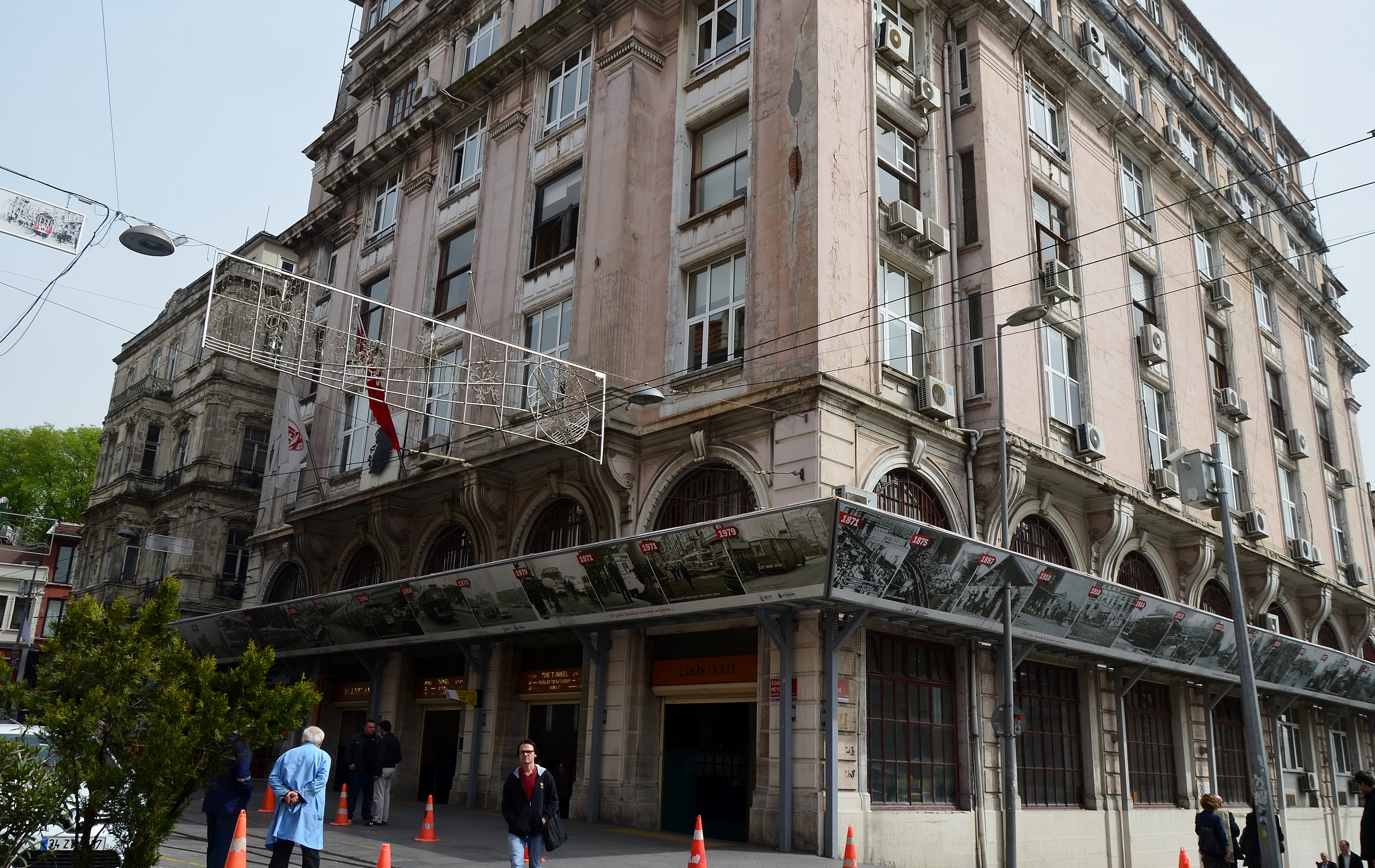
The entrance to Beyoğlu station and the Metrohan Building (1914)

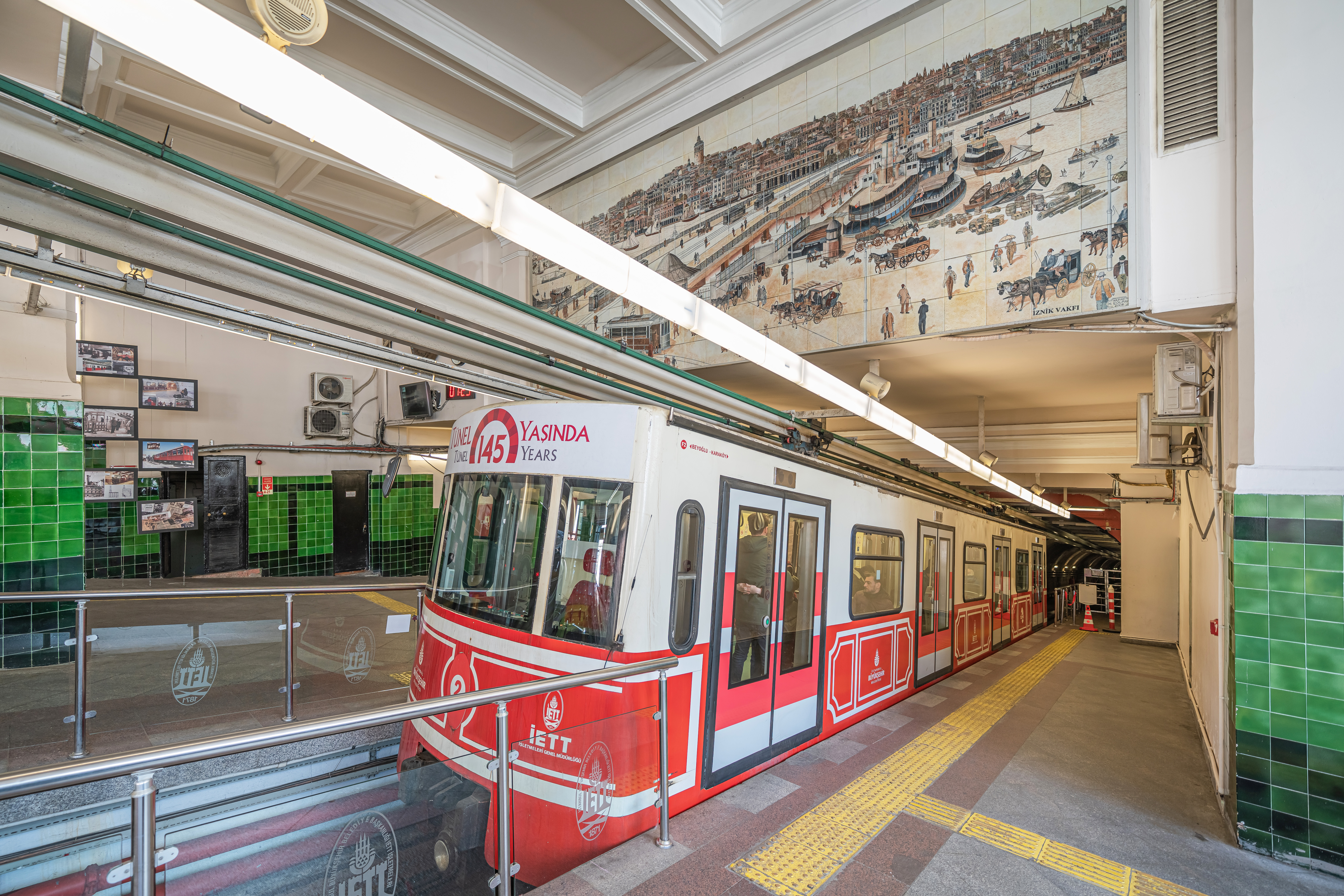
Tünel train at Beyoğlu station. Ceramic mosaic above was installed in 2008.

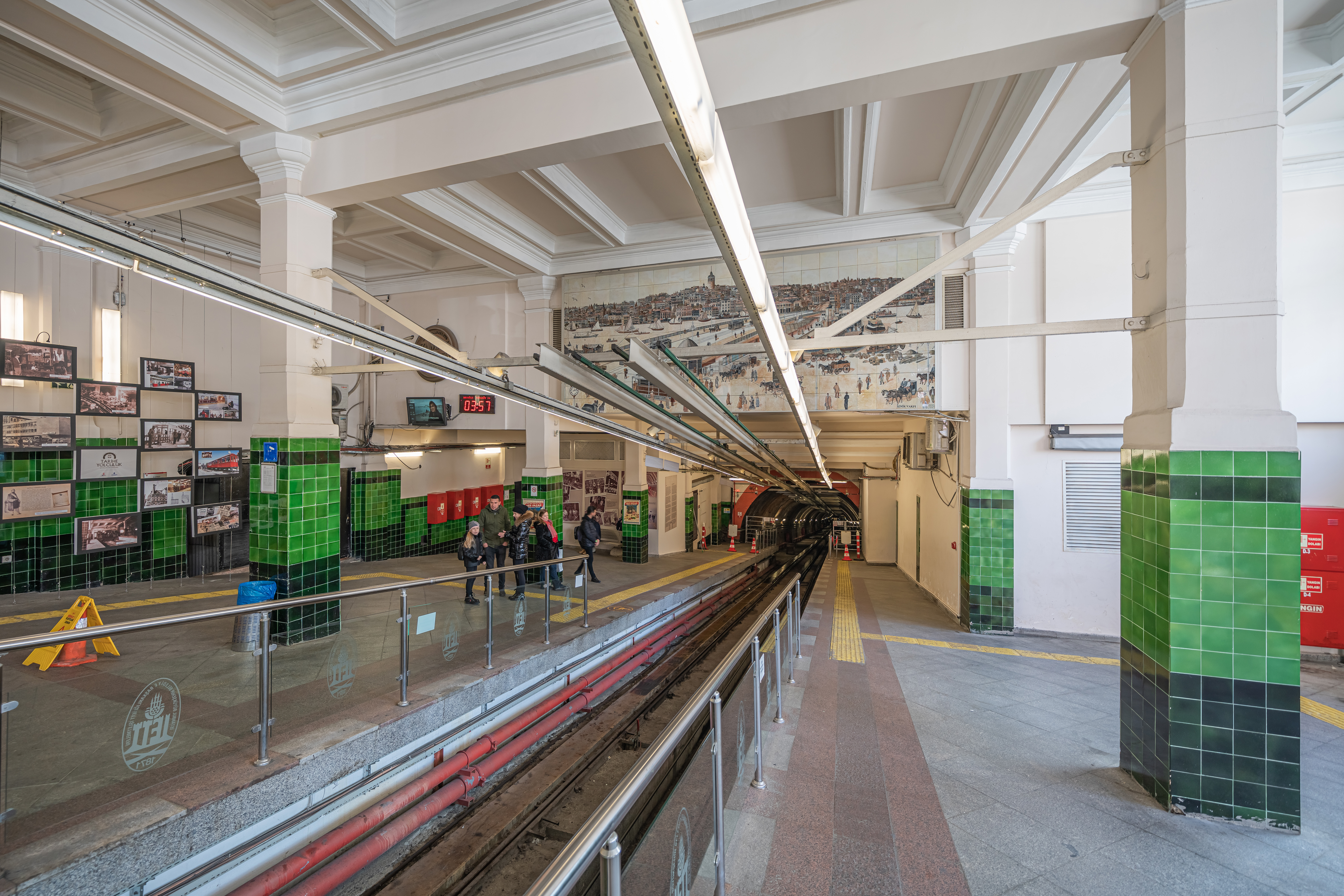
Beyoğlu station
