= Tünel =

Funicular line in Istanbul, Turkey

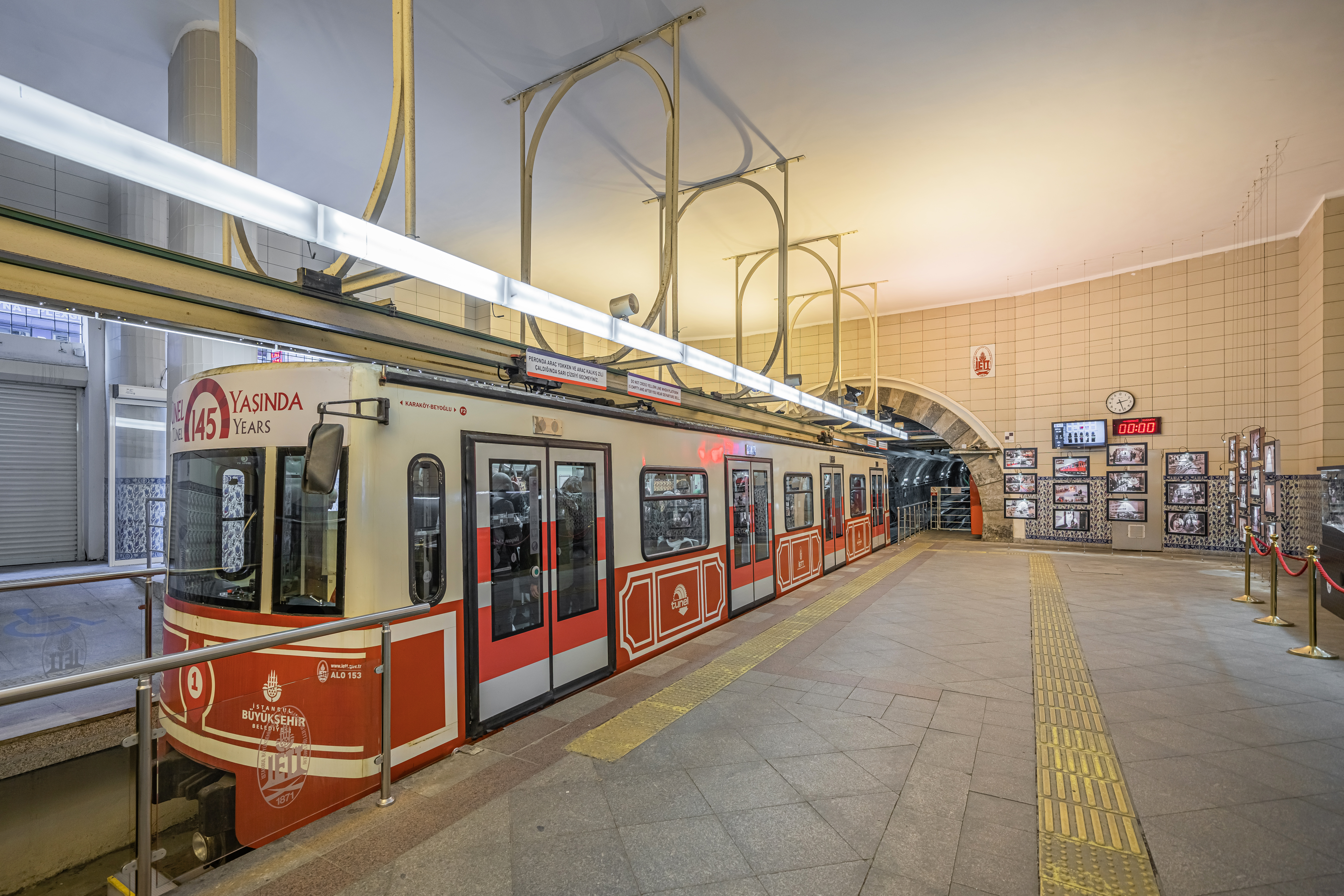
- Karaköy station of the Tünel

Overview
- Owner: Istanbul Metropolitan Municipality
- Line number: F2
- Locale: Beyoğlu, Istanbul
- Termini: Karaköy (lower station); Beyoğlu (upper station)
- Stations: 2

Service
- Type: Rubber-tyred Funicular
- Operator(s): İETT

History
- Opened: 17 January 1875

Technical
- Line length: 573 m (1,880 ft)
- Number of tracks: 1 (with a passing loop)
- Character: Underground
- Track gauge: 1,435 mm (4 ft 8 1/2 in)
- Maximum incline: 15%

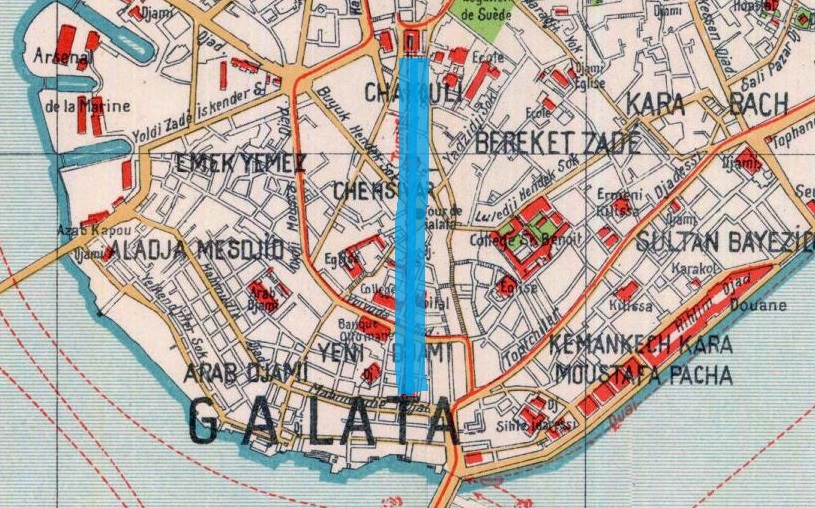
Galata 1922 map showing the route of the Tünel

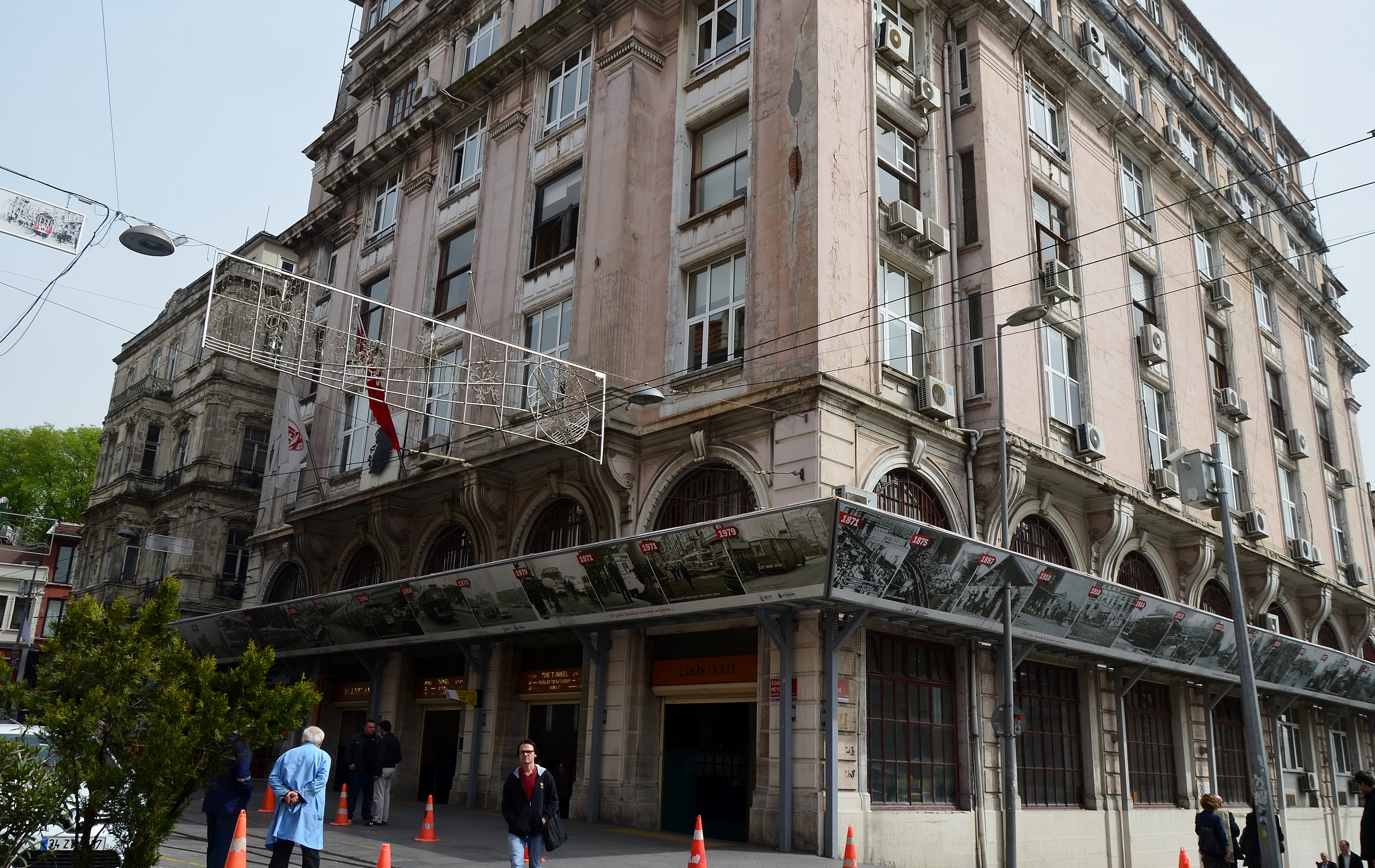
Built between 1912 and 1914, the Metrohan Building (Beyoğlu station) is the northern terminus of the Tünel. It is located at Tünel Square, near the southern end of Istiklal Avenue.

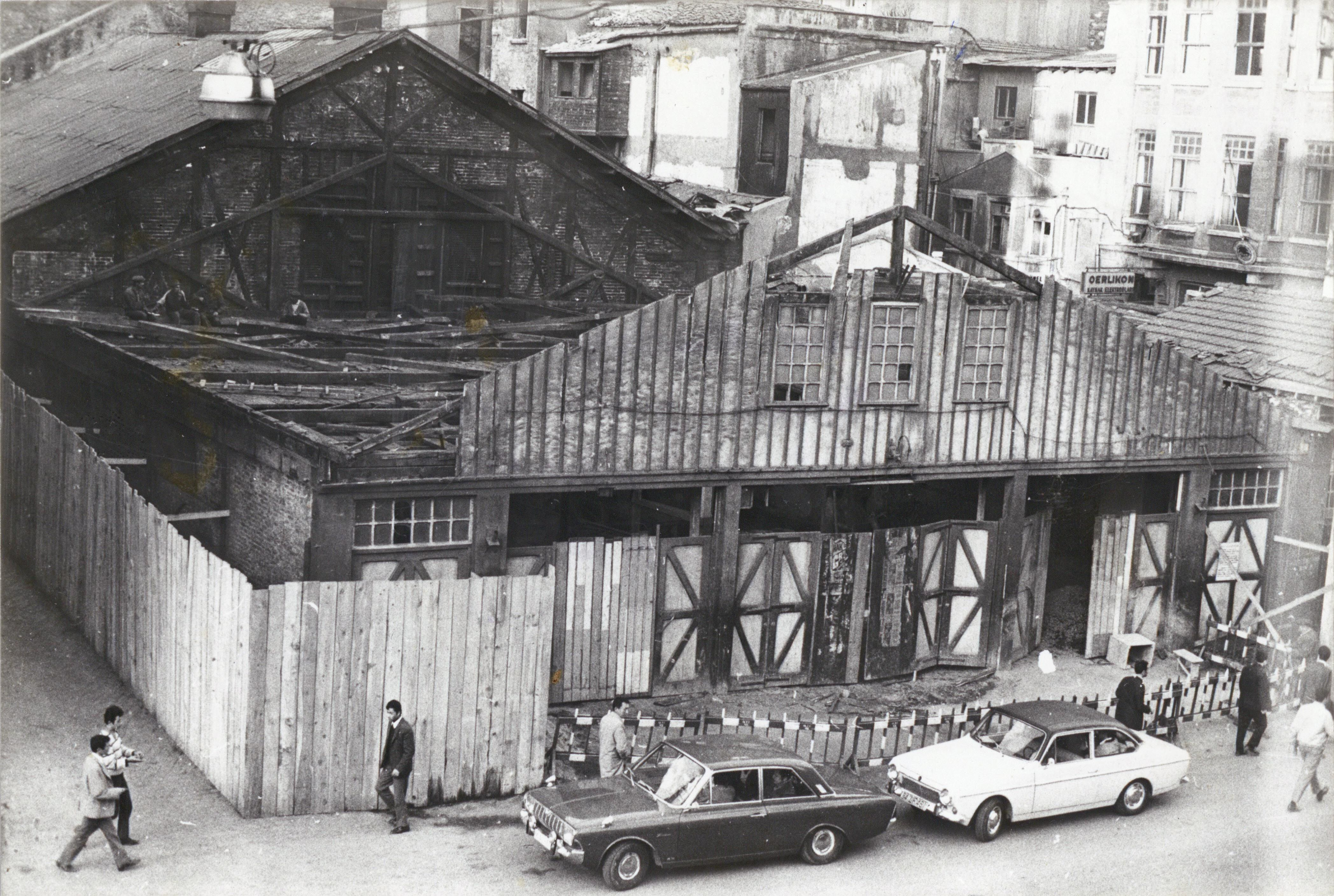
Demolition of the old Tünel Building in Karaköy (southern terminus of the Tünel, near Bankalar Caddesi), c. 1968, before it was replaced by the current Karaköy station building.

The Tünel (English: Tunnel, designated as the F2 line on the Istanbul transport map) is a historic underground rubber-tyred funicular line in Istanbul, Turkey. It has two stations, connecting Karaköy and Beyoğlu. The tunnel runs uphill from near the confluence of the Golden Horn with the Bosphorus and is about 573 metres (1,880 feet) long.

The Tünel was inaugurated on January 17, 1875, making it the second-oldest underground urban railway in the world after the London Underground which opened on January 10, 1863.

== History ==
In the second half of the 19th century the neighbourhoods of Pera (modern day Beyoğlu) and Galata (modern day Karaköy) had become the financial and commercial heart of Constantinople (modern day Istanbul) and the Ottoman Empire. Many Ottoman and foreign companies, mostly banks and insurance companies, set up their headquarters in these two neighbourhoods. Foreign embassies, hotels and commercial markets in Pera were located at the top of a steep hill while the stock exchange, banks and ports in Galata were at the bottom. Travelling between these two districts was challenging, since grades were as steep as 24%. The main street between these two areas, Yüksek Kaldırım (High Pavement) Avenue, saw an average of 40,000 people walking up and down it daily.

In 1867 a French engineer, Eugène-Henri Gavand, went to Istanbul, (Constantinople) as a tourist. During his visit, he was taken aback to see the number of people struggling up and down Yüksek Kaldırım Avenue. Gavand came up with the idea of building a funicular railway that would ascend and descend the hill and went back to France shortly after to prepare his project. He returned to Constantinople in February 1868 to present his project to the Sublime Porte. The railway would start from near Yüksek Kaldırım Avenue at a point close to the Galata Bridge in Galata.

On 10 June 1869 Sultan Abdülaziz granted Gavand a concession to build the railway. He worked with shareholders in France to start a company to build the railway, but eventually the Prussian invasion of France made the formation of a French-based company impossible.

During the war, Gavand went to the United Kingdom and formed the Metropolitan Railway of Constantinople to develop the line. Construction began on 30 July 1871 but was delayed by conflicts between landowners and the company. The tunnel was not completed until December 1874, and finally opened for service on 17 January 1875. Gavand was notably absent at the opening ceremony.

The Metropolitan Railway company gained a fresh 75-year concession in 1904. In 1911, after some alterations, the rights to the Tünel were transferred to the new multinational consortium, Union Ottoman Société d'Intrepises Electriques à Constantinople. which encompassed the Tünel, the trams, and the Ottoman Joint Stock Electric Company. In 1939 it was absorbed into the new IETT (İstanbul Elektrik Tramvay ve Tünel) transport organisation.

In 1968 the Tünel was closed for renovation. In 1971 it reopened, having been modernised and electrified. In 2007 the Tünel was restored again to strengthen its seismic resistance in a city prone to earthquakes.

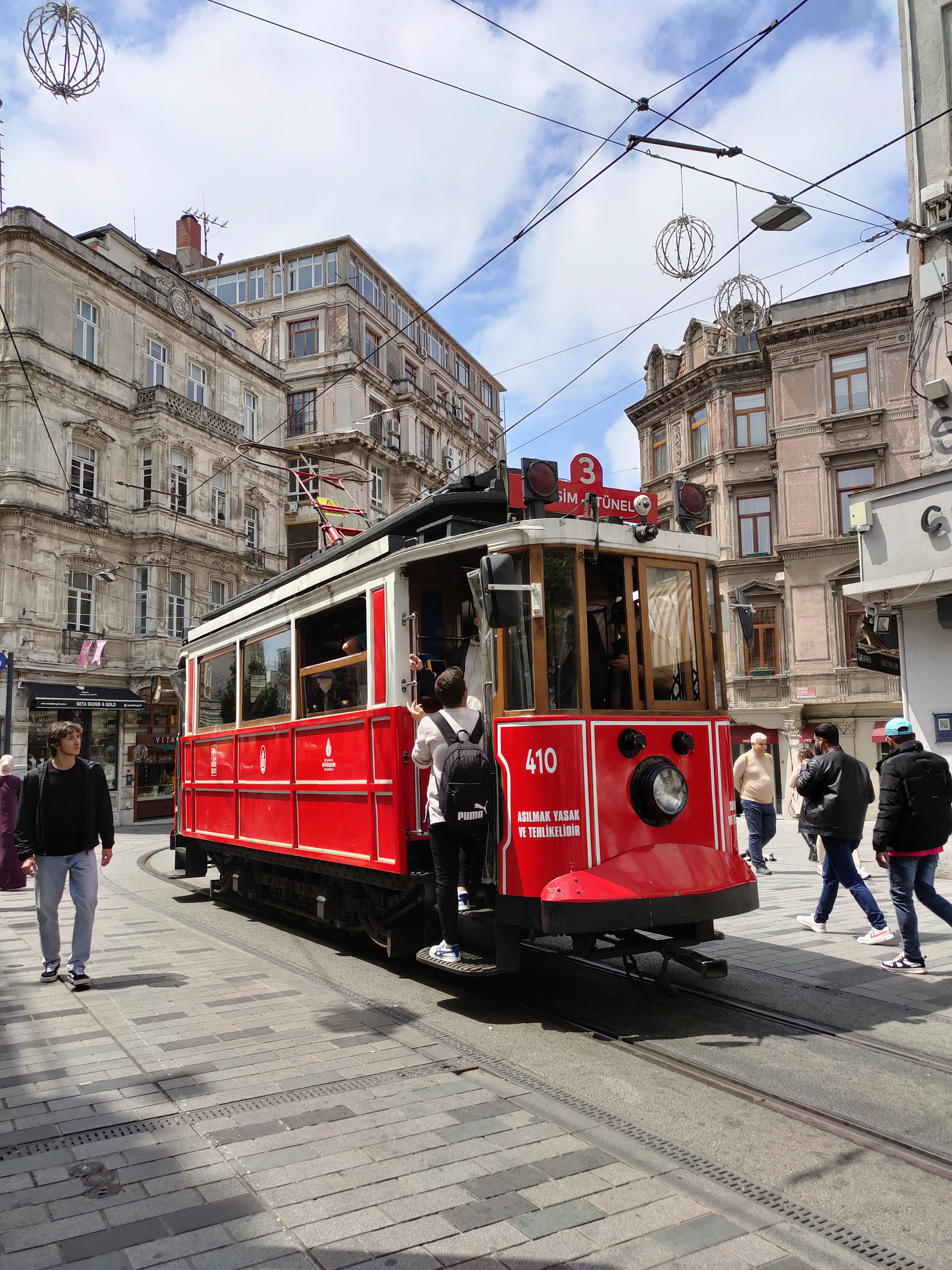
The nostalgic tram that operates between Tünel Square (seen in this image, with the Metrohan Building in the background) and Taksim Square at the northern end of Istiklal Avenue.

Today, the short line is still a crucial component of the municipal transport network.

== Description ==
The Tünel consists of a single brick-lined tunnel measuring 554.8 metres (1,820 ft) long, 6.7 metres (22 ft) wide and 4.9 metres (16 ft) high. It has one station at either end:

- Karaköy — the lower station, located at the eastern end of Tersane Avenue
- Tünel — the upper station on Tünel Square (Tünel Meydanı), located at the southern end of Istiklal Avenue

The upper station stands 61.55 metres (201.9 ft) above the lower one.

The gradient of the tunnel varies along its length from 2 percent to 15 percent. Originally built with two parallel tracks, the modern Tünel has a single track with a passing loop in the middle, a short duplex section, where two trains pass side by side.

== Rolling stock ==
The original rolling stock consisted of two wooden two-car trains. One car was reserved for passengers, with its two classes provided divided into separate sections for men and women. The other car was used to transport goods, animals and carts. Motive power was provided by steam engines.

The wooden carriages were replaced in 1971 with two electrified steel cars running on pneumatic tires over concrete tracks, thus similarly to the rubber-tyred metro it could be called a rubber-tyred funicular.

The current rolling stock is a refurbished and modified version of the MP 55, which was used on the Paris Metro.

In 2007 a new generation of a rolling stock was brought into operation. Today each car can carry 170 passengers and travels at a maximum speed of 22 km/h (14 mph). A trip from top to bottom takes about 1.5 minutes, with normal waiting time 3.5 minutes. In 2021 the first female driver joined the staff of the Tünel.

== Gallery ==
Historical drawings
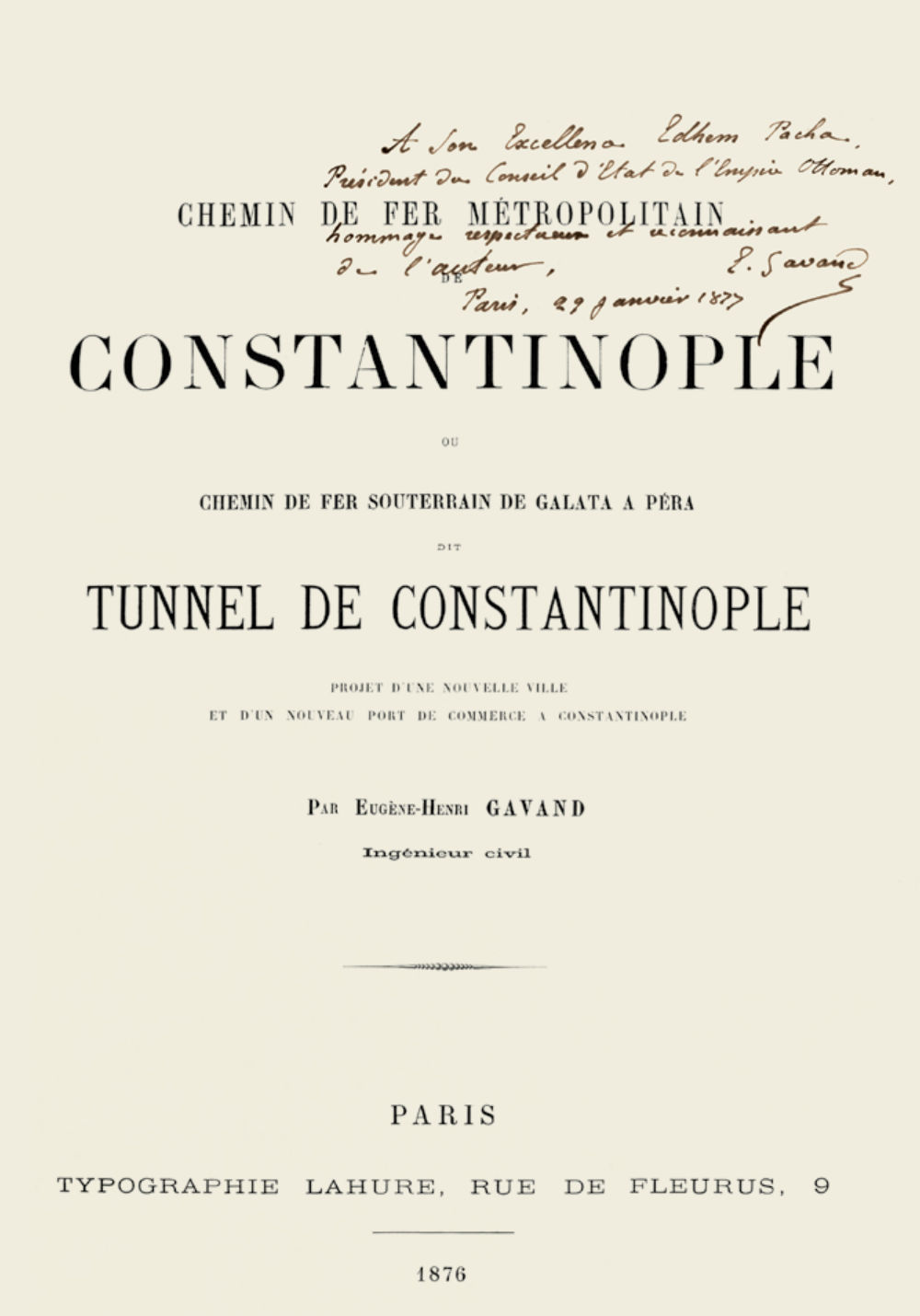
Front page of the project booklet

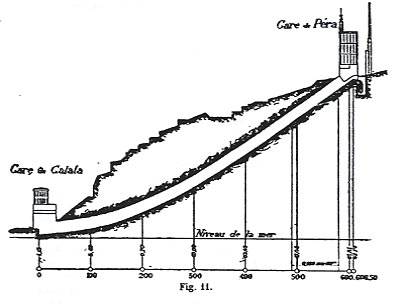
Simplified profile of the tunnel

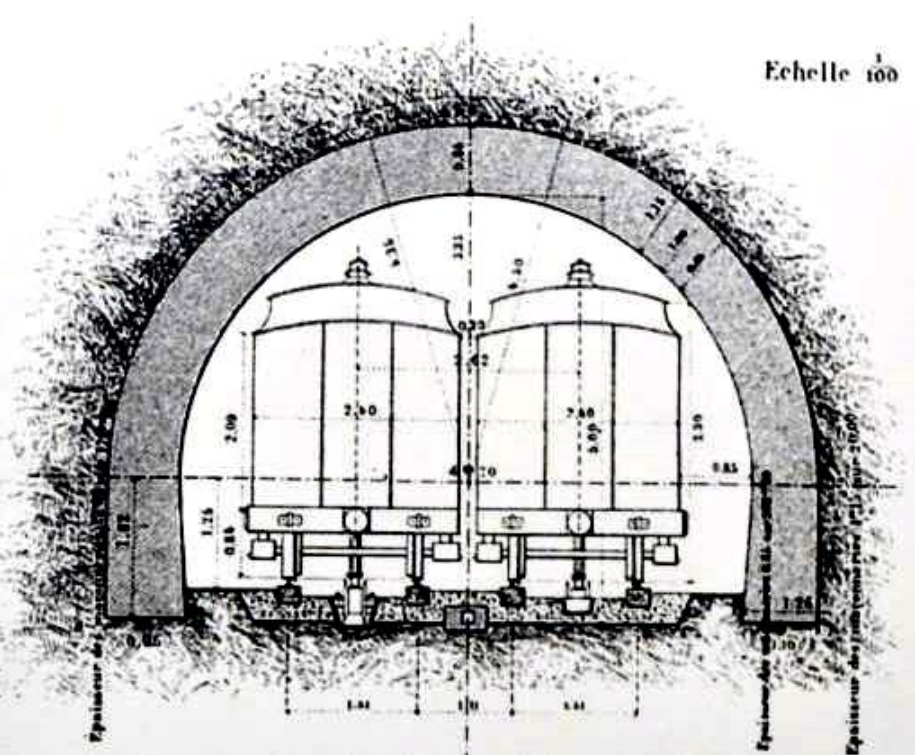
Initial arrangement for a tunnel section

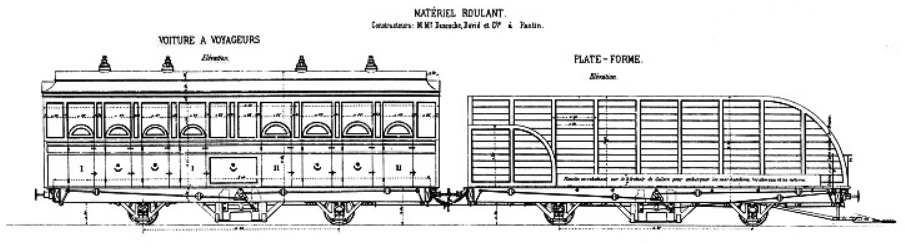
Original train

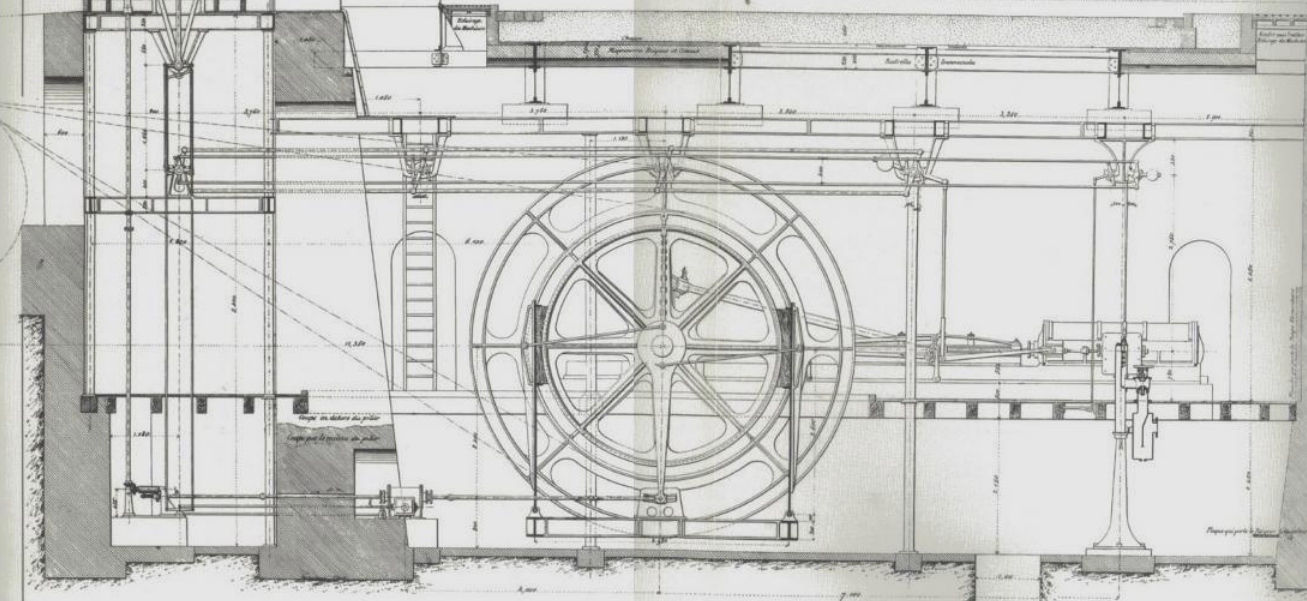
Steam engine
Photos
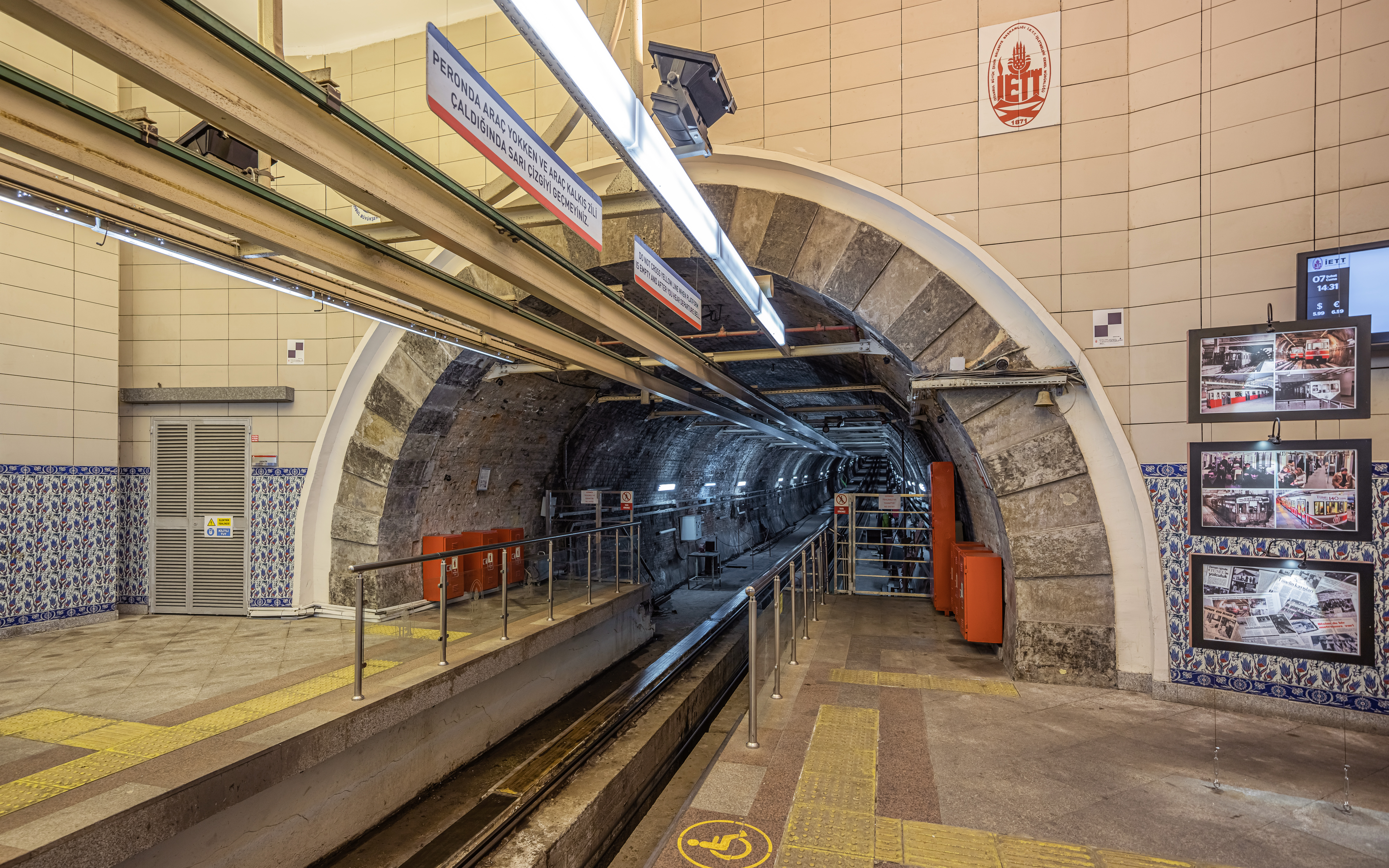
Karaköy station with the tunnel portal

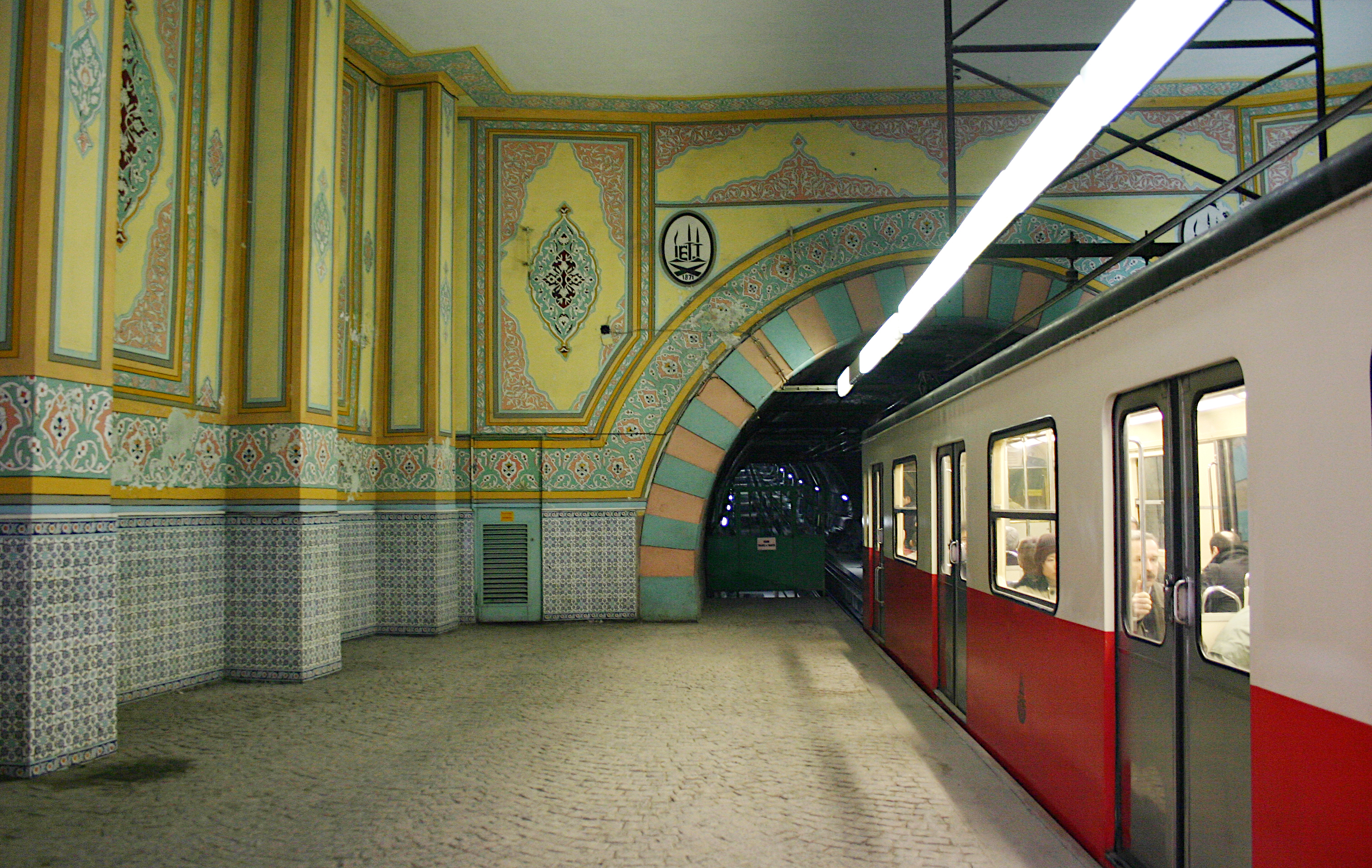
Karaköy station in 2006 decorated in the Ottoman Revival style

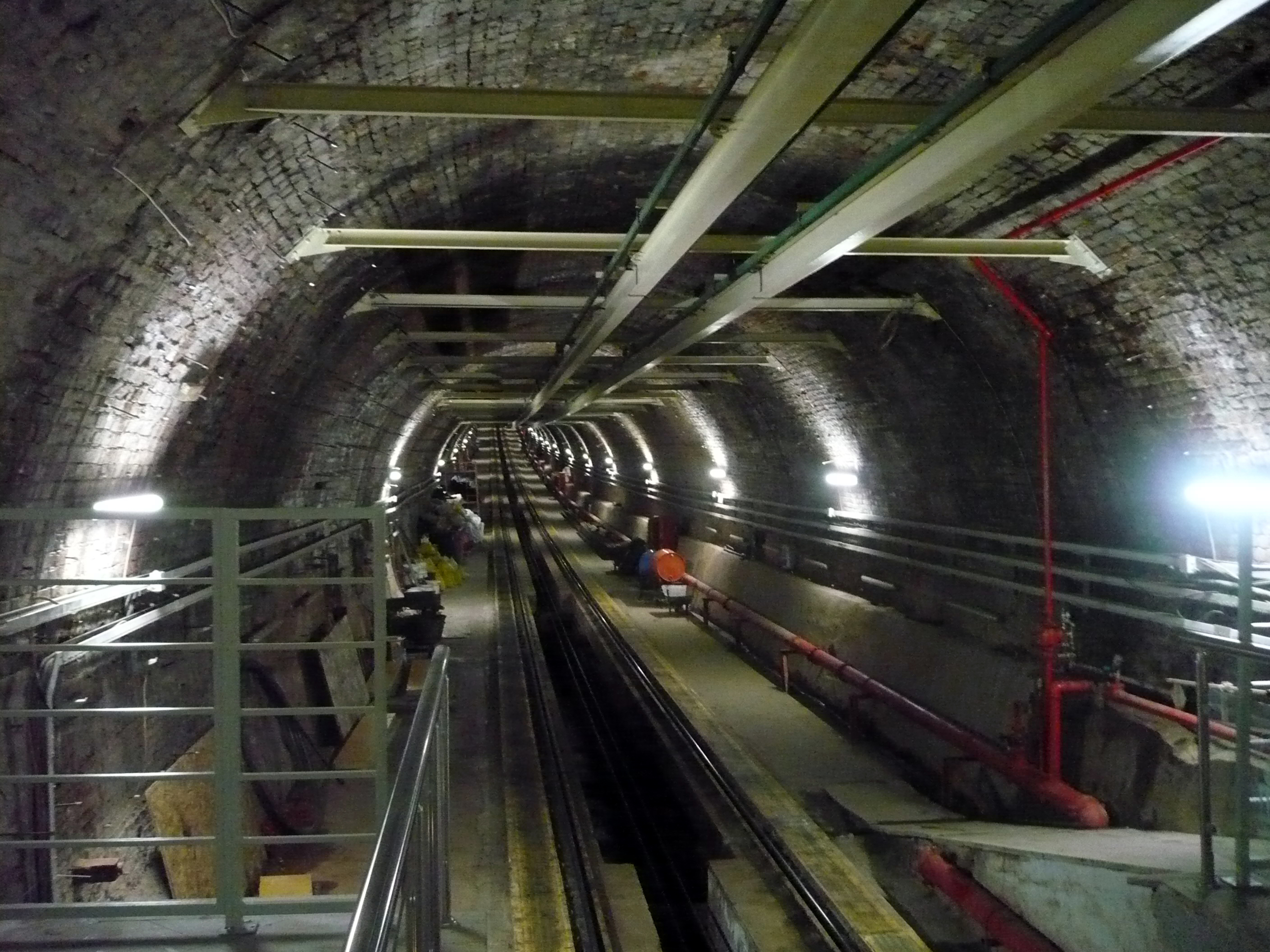
The tunnel between Beyoğlu and Karaköy station

Video of the funicular

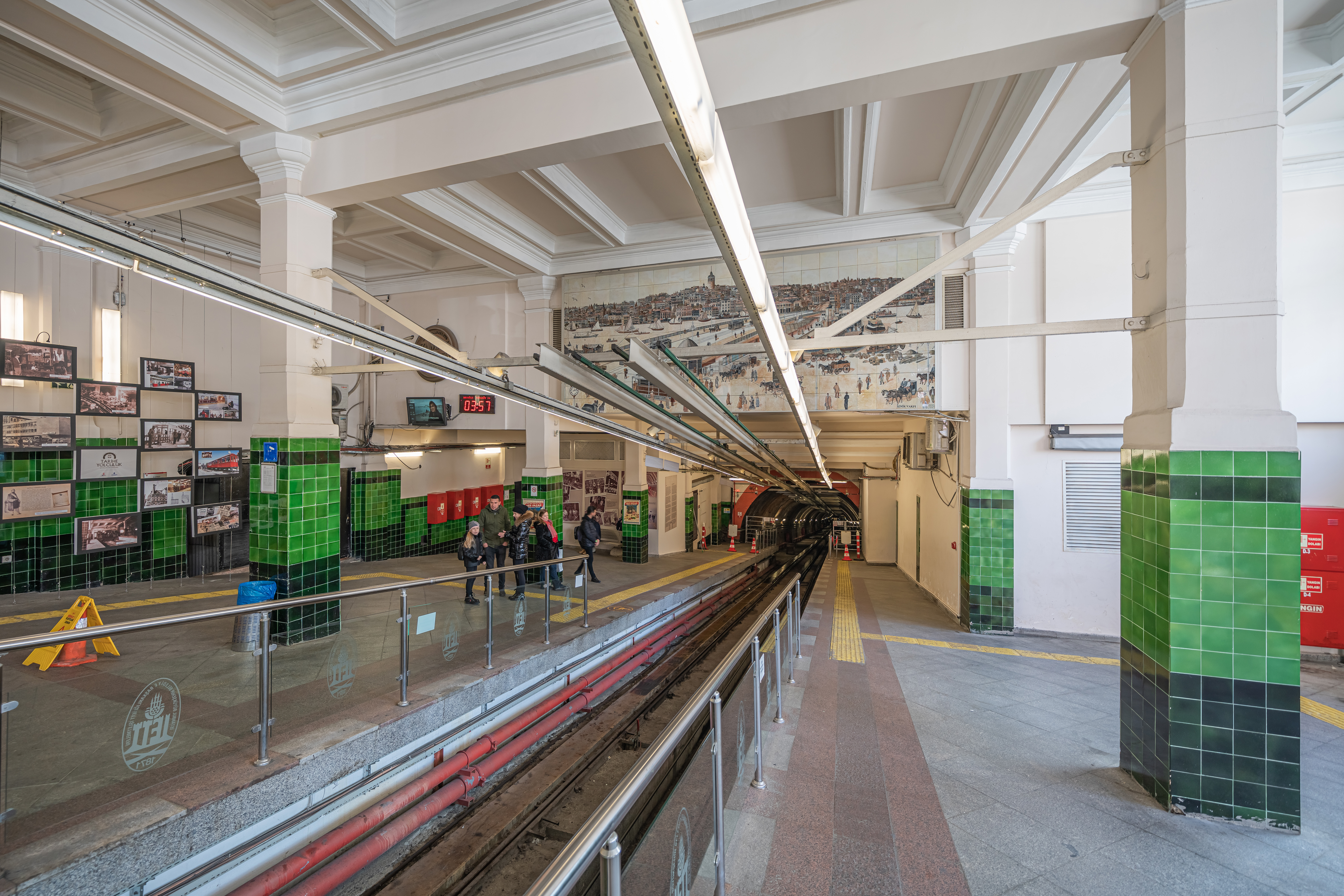
Beyoğlu station

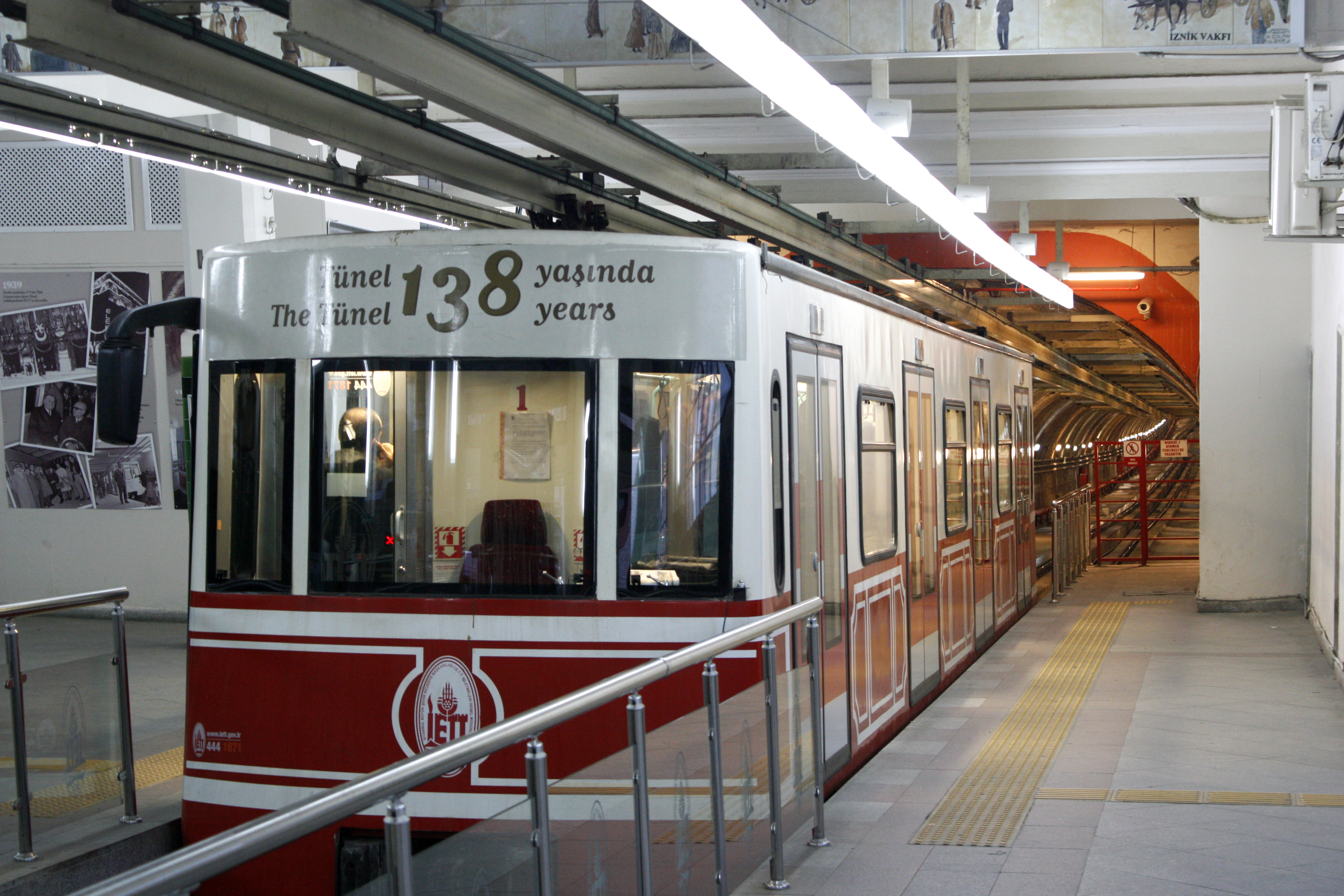
Train at Beyoğlu station

== See also ==
- Istanbul Kabataş–Taksim funicular
- Istanbul Metro
- Istanbul modern tramways
- Istanbul nostalgic tramways
- Public transport in Istanbul
- List of funicular railways
- Metro Line M1 (Budapest Metro), built from 1894 to 1896
