= Karaköy (Tünel) =

Funicular station in Istanbul, Turkey

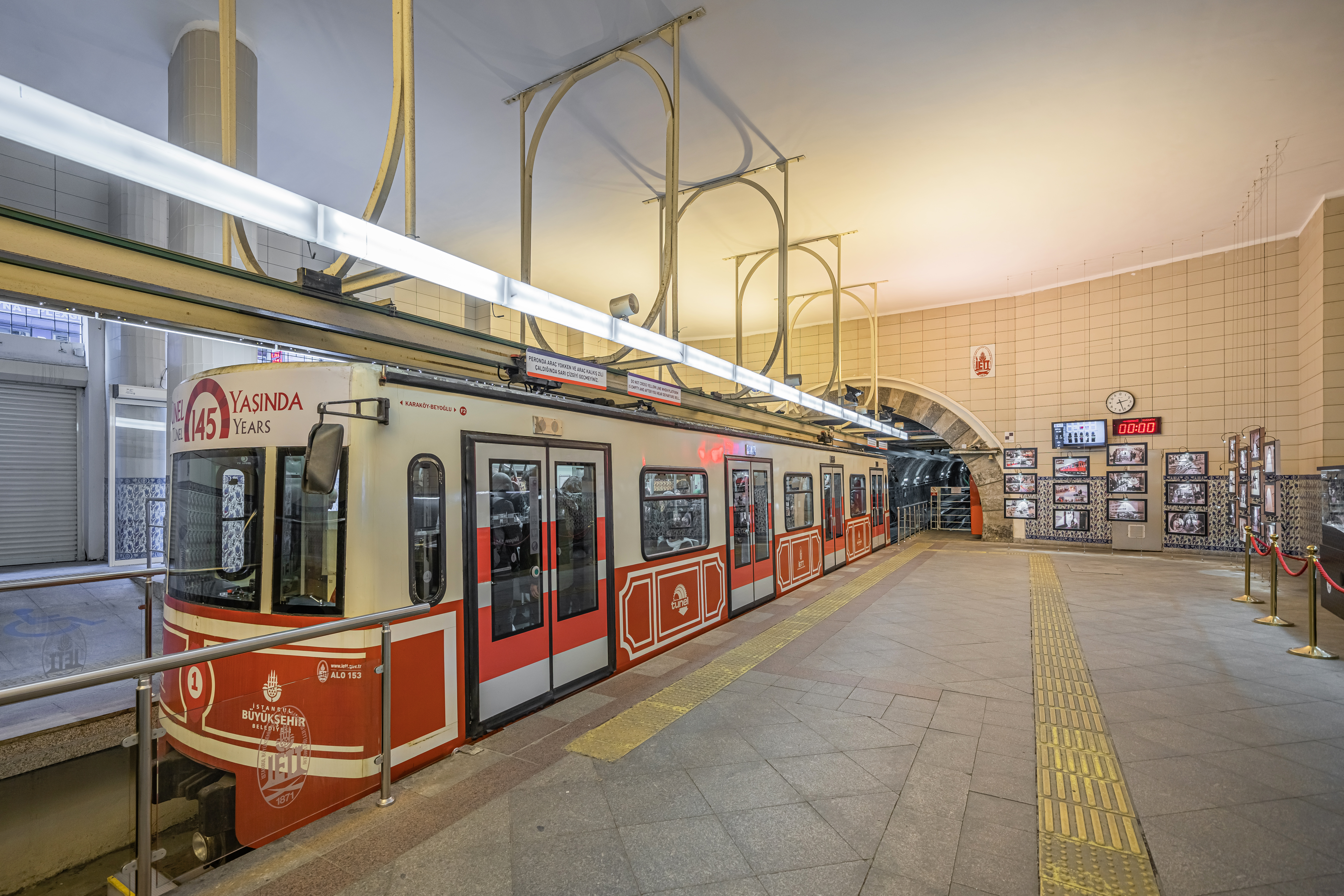

General information
- Location: Tersane Cd. 9, Arap Cami Mah., 34421; Beyoğlu, Istanbul; Turkey
- Coordinates: 41.0228°N 28.9739°E
- Owner: Istanbul Metropolitan Municipality
- Line: Tünel
- Platforms: 1 bay platform
- Tracks: 1
- Connections: Istanbul Tram: T1 at Karaköy; Şehir Hatları at Karaköy Pier; Turyol at Karaköy; İETT Bus: 26, 26A, 26B, 28, 28T, 30D, 31E, 32, 33, 33B, 33ES, 33TE, 33Y, 35, 36CE, 36KE, 37E, 38E, 44B, 46Ç, 47, 47Ç, 47E, 47N, 48E, 50E, 54E, 54TE, 66, 70D, 70FE, 70KE, 74, 74A, 77Ç, 78, 78H, 79E, 82, 90, 91O, 92, 92A, 92C, 93, 94, 97A, 97GE, 99, 99A, 99Y, 146B, 336E, EM1, EM2

Construction
- Structure type: At-grade
- Accessible: Yes

History
- Opened: 17 January 1875
- Closed: 1968-71
- Rebuilt: 1971
- Former names: Galata

Passengers
- 2017: 15,068 (Average daily ridership)

Services
Preceding station	İETT	Following station
Beyoğlu Terminus	F2	Terminus
Track layout
Location

Karaköy is a station on the historic Tünel funicular railway in Beyoğlu, Istanbul. Located on Tersane Avenue, just north of the Golden Horn, it is the southern and lower terminus of the 573 m (1,880 ft) railway. The station is located on the ground floor of the IETT General Headquarters Building.

== Overview ==
Karaköy station is located at Tersane Avenue No:9 and is on the ground floor of the IETT General Headquarters Building. The entrance to the station is located on the southeast corner of the building, while the exit is located on the west side of the building. The station is at-grade at the base of Galata Hill. The tunnel begins at the northern end of the platforms, as the track heads straight into the hill and up to Beyoğlu. Like its counterpart station, Beyoğlu, the Spanish solution is used at Karaköy, as the east platform is for boarding passengers and the west platform is for exiting passengers. The station is integrated within the citywide smartcard system, Istanbulkart, and turnstiles are located at the station's entrance.

Connection to the T1 line of the Istanbul Tram to Kabataş or Bağcılar is available along with ferry service from the two piers in Karaköy. Municipal ferries, operated by Şehir Hatları, depart from Karaköy Pier located east of Karaköy station, on Rıhtım Avenue. Private ferries, operated by Turyol, depart from Turyol's Karaköy Pier located one block south of Karaköy station. Connection to several IETT city bus lines on Kemeraltı Avenue is also available.

== History ==
Karaköy station, along with Beyoğlu station, is one of the oldest subterranean urban railway stations in the world. Construction began in the summer of 1871 and was completed in 1874, along with the rest of the railway line. Karaköy station officially opened, along with Tünel, on 17 January 1875 as Galata station. The station was originally built with two tracks and two side platforms and was powered by a steam engine. The station building was a two-story structure, built mostly from wood. On 25 August 1875, the cable carrying the northbound train snapped towards near Beyoğlu and the car began to plunge backward toward Karaköy. A major accident was averted as the driver was able to hit the emergency brakes and stop the train just 40 m (130 ft) short of Karaköy station.

Karaköy station, along with the railway, was nationalized and bought by IETT in 1939, which continued to operate the railway. Karaköy station temporarily closed down in 1968 for IETT to modernize and electrify the railway. Since the steam engine was replaced by an electric engine, the wooden Karaköy station building needed to be replaced. The station was modernized and rebuilt into a stone structure and officially reopened on 2 November 1971. In 1981, the construction of the IETT General Headquarters Building began and was completed in 1983. This 7-story building was built on top of Karaköy station.

Connection to Istanbul's modern tram network became available in 2005, when the T1 line was extended from Eminönü to Karaköy.

== Nearby places of interest ==
- Galata Bridge - The oldest bridge across the Golden Horn.
- Bankalar Avenue - The financial center of the Ottoman Empire.
