= Haliç Bridge (disambiguation) =

The Haliç Bridge is a highway bridge on the Golden Horn in Istanbul, Turkey.

Haliç Bridge may also refer to:

- Atatürk Bridge
- Galata Bridge

or:

- Haliç Metro Bridge
