= Panagal Park metro station =

Upcoming Chennai Metro's Yellow Line metro station

Panagal Park

General information
- Coordinates: 13.04076°N 80.23336°E
- System: Chennai Metro station
- Owner: Chennai Metro Rail Limited (CMRL)
- Operator: Chennai Metro
- Line: Yellow Line
- Platforms: Island platform Platform-1 → Lighthouse; Platform-2 → Poonamallee Bypass
- Tracks: 2

Construction
- Structure type: Underground, Double track
- Platform levels: 2
- Accessible: Yes

Other information
- Status: Under Construction

History
- Opening: June 2028; 20 months' time (TBC)
- Electrified: Single phase 25 kV, 35 Hz AC through overhead catenary

Services
Preceding station	Chennai Metro	Following station
Kodambakkam towards Poonamallee Bypass	Yellow Line (Under Construction)	Nandanam towards Lighthouse
Kodambakkam towards Parandur Airport	Yellow Line (Future Service)	Nandanam towards Lighthouse
Route map
Location

Panagal Park is an upcoming underground metro station on the East-West Corridor of the Yellow Line of Chennai Metro in Chennai, India. This metro station will be among the 30 stations of Corridor IV and 12 underground stations along Corridor IV of the Chennai Metro, Poonamallee Bypass–Lighthouse stretch. This metro station is slated to be commercialized on June 2028.

== History ==
In February 2021, Chennai Metro Rail Limited (CMRL) invited bids for the construction of this Panagal Park metro station situated on the underground section stretching from Kodambakkam Flyover to Boat Club, which also forms a part of Corridor 4 under Phase 2 of the Chennai Metro network.

Apart from this metro station, this package includes four other stations, namely Kodambakkam Flyover, Kodambakkam, Nandanam, and Boat Club. The group of bidders participated in this package as well, namely ITD Cementation India Ltd., Larsen & Toubro (L&T), Gulermak, Shanghai Tunnel Engineering Co. Ltd. (STEC), and a joint venture of J Kumar Infraprojects–Patel Infrastructure.

Upon evaluation, ITD Cementation India Ltd., submitted the most favorable bid in both technical and financial terms and was consequently awarded the contract. They commenced underground construction in accordance with the approved execution framework, marking another milestone in the progress of Corridor 4.

== Station layout ==
Station Layout - To Be Confirmed

G	Street level	Exit/Entrance
L1	Mezzanine	Fare control, station agent, Ticket/token, shops
L2	Platform 1 Eastbound	Towards → Lighthouse; Next Station: Nandanam; Change at the next station for Blue Line
L2	Island platform | Doors will open on the right
L2	Platform 2 Westbound	Towards ← Poonamallee Bypass ** Next Station: Kodambakkam
L2	Note:	** (Further extension to Parandur Airport in the future)

== Entry/Exit ==
Panagal Park metro station is set to be the largest metro station constructed in Phase 2 of Chennai Metro. It will have 5 Entry/Exit points to serve the crowd in commercial hub of T. Nagar.

- The 5 entry points are planned at Sivagnanam Street, Pinjala Subramaniam Street, Prakasam Street, Bashyam Street and Nageswaran Road.

== See also ==
- List of Chennai metro stations
- Railway stations in Chennai
- Transport in Chennai
- Urban rail transit in India
- List of metro systems
