= Nandanam metro station =

Chennai Metro's Blue Line metro station

Nandanam

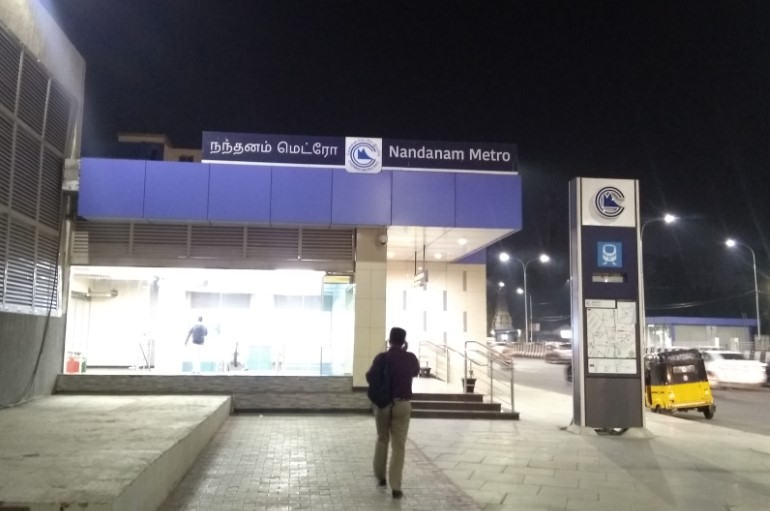

General information
- Location: Rathna Nagar, Nandanam, Chennai, Tamil Nadu 600035; India
- Coordinates: 13°01′54″N 80°14′26″E
- System: Chennai Metro station
- Owner: Chennai Metro
- Operator: Chennai Metro Rail Limited (CMRL)
- Line: Blue Line Yellow Line
- Platforms: Island platform Platform-1 → Chennai International Airport (to be extended to Kilambakkam in the future); Platform-2 → Wimco Nagar Depot; Platform-3 → Lighthouse; Platform-4 → Parandur Airport
- Tracks: 4

Construction
- Structure type: Underground, double track
- Accessible: Yes
- Architectural style: Chennai Metro

Other information
- Station code: SCR

History
- Opened: 25 May 2018; 8 years ago
- Electrified: Single phase 25 kV, 50 Hz AC through overhead catenary

Services
Preceding station	Chennai Metro	Following station
Teynampet towards Wimco Nagar Depot	Blue Line	Saidapet towards Chennai International Airport
Teynampet towards Wimco Nagar Depot	Blue Line (future service)	Saidapet towards Kilambakkam
Panagal Park towards Poonamallee Bypass	Yellow Line (under construction)	Boat Club towards Lighthouse
Panagal Park towards Parandur Airport	Yellow Line (future service)	Boat Club towards Lighthouse
Route map
Location

Nandanam is an underground metro station on the North-South Corridor of the Blue Line of Chennai Metro in Chennai, India. This station serves the neighbourhoods of Nandanam and T. Nagar. It has a length of 230 to 250 meters.

This metro station will serve as an interchange with the upcoming Yellow Line under Phase 2 of Chennai Metro and is slated to be commercialized on June 2028.

== History ==
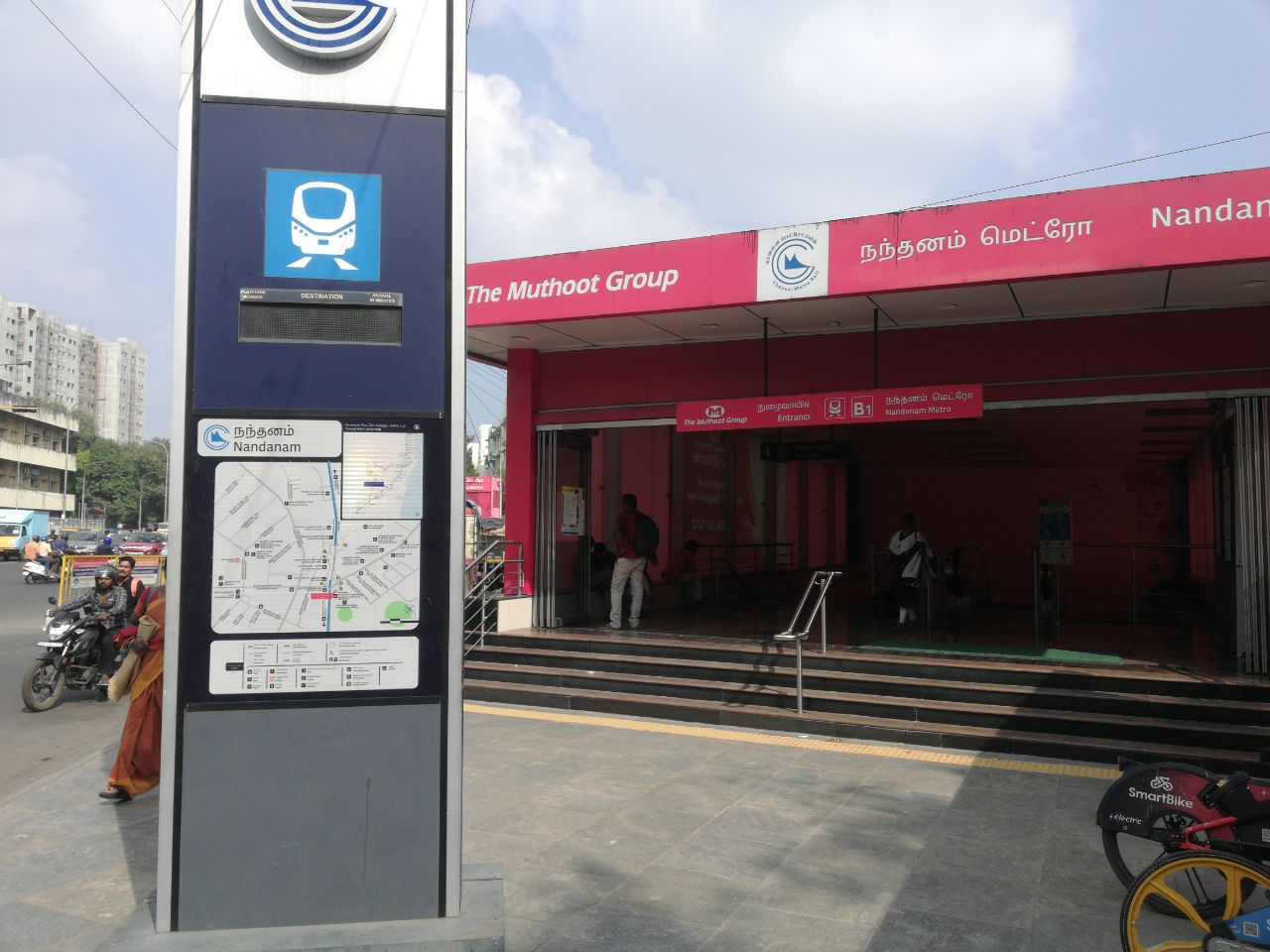
Anna Salai entrance of the station as in January 2023

=== Orange Line ===
In February 2021, Chennai Metro Rail Limited (CMRL) invited bids for the construction of this Panagal Park metro station situated on the underground section stretching from Kodambakkam Flyover to Boat Club, which also forms a part of Corridor 4 under Phase 2 of the Chennai Metro network.

Apart from this metro station, this package included four other stations: Kodambakkam Flyover, Kodambakkam, Panagal Park, and Boat Club. A group of bidders participated in this package as well, including ITD Cementation India Ltd., Larsen & Toubro, Gulermak, Shanghai Tunnel Engineering Co. Ltd. (STEC), and a joint venture of J Kumar Infraprojects–Patel Infrastructure.

Upon evaluation, ITD Cementation India Ltd. submitted the most favorable bid in both technical and financial terms and was consequently awarded the contract. They commenced underground construction in accordance with the approved execution framework, marking another milestone in the progress of Corridor 4.

== Station layout ==
G	Street level	Exit/entrance
M	Mezzanine	Fare control, station agent, ticket/token, shops
P1	Platform 1 Southbound	Towards → Chennai International Airport ** Next station: Saidapet
P1	Island platform | Doors will open on the right
P1	Platform 2 Northbound	Towards ← Wimco Nagar Depot; Next station: Teynampet
P1	Note:	** (further extension to Kilambakkam in the future)
P2	Platform 3 Southbound	Towards → Lighthouse; Next station: Boat Club
P2	Island platform | Doors will open on the right
P2	Platform 4 Northbound	Towards ← Poonamallee Bypass ** Next station: Panagal Park
P2	Note:	** (further extension to Parandur Airport in the future)

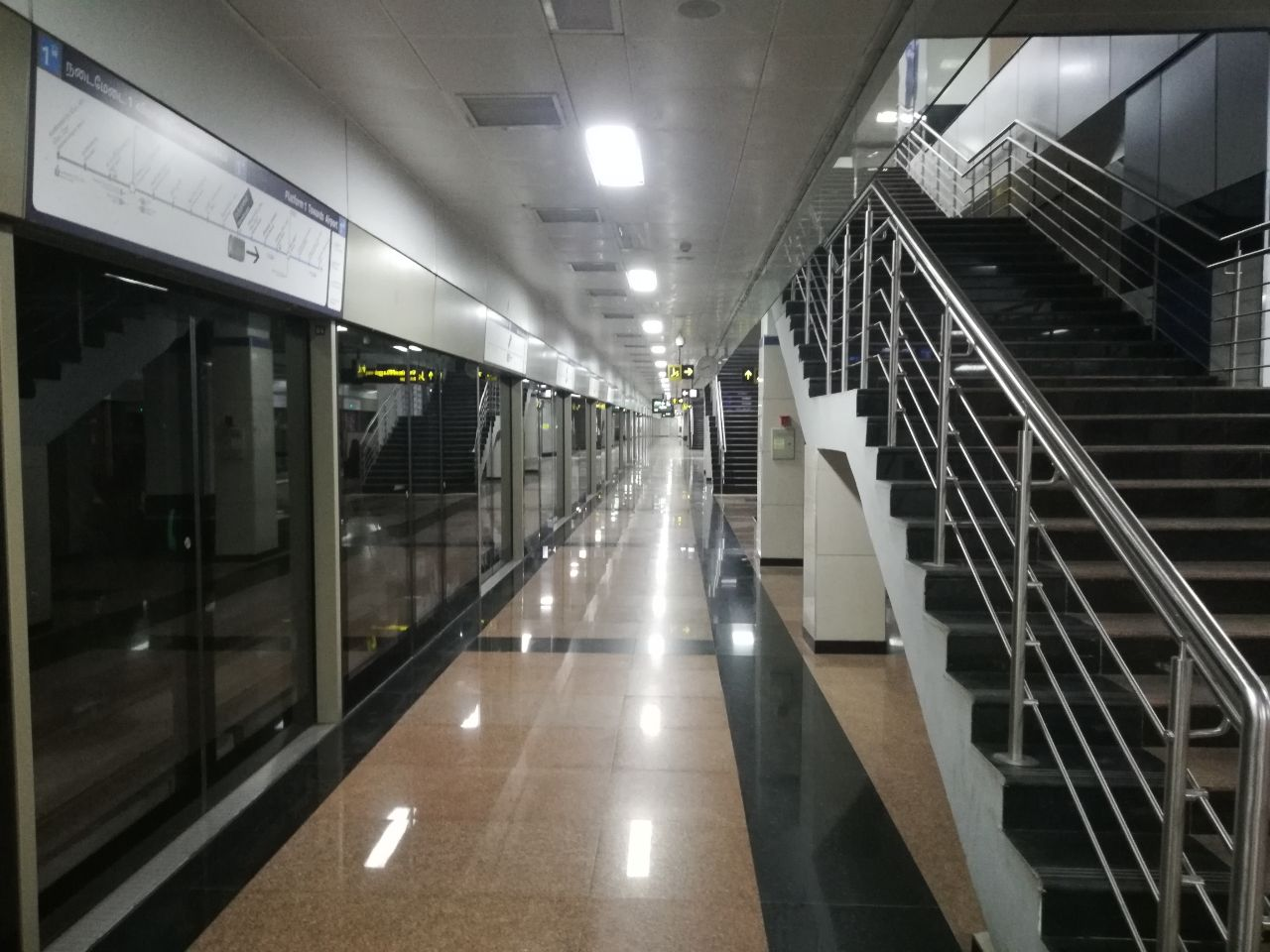
Nandanam metro station

Nandanam metro station
- Interactive map of the Nandanam metro station area

General information
- Status: Completed
- Type: Metro station
- Location: Chennai, India
- Completed: 2018
- Opened: 25 May 2018

Design and construction
- Main contractor: L&T-SUCG JV

Website
- http://chennaimetrorail.org/

== Connections ==
=== Bus ===
Metropolitan Transport Corporation (Chennai) bus routes number 1B, 12C, 18A, 18D, 18E, 18K, 18R, 23C, 23V, 41D, 45B, 45E, 51J, 51P, 52, 52B, 52K, 52P, 54, 54D, 54M, 60, 60A, 60D, 60H, 88Ccut, 88K, 88R, 118A, 188, 221, 221H, A45B, A51, B18, D51, E18, M45E, M51R, and N45B serve the station from nearby Nandanam Military Quarters bus stand.

== Entry/exit ==
Nandanam metro station entry/exits
Gate No-A1	Gate No-A2	Gate No-A3	Gate No-A4

== See also ==
- Anna Salai
- List of Chennai metro stations
- Railway stations in Chennai
- Chennai Mass Rapid Transit System
- Chennai Monorail
- Chennai Suburban Railway
- Chennai International Airport
- Transport in Chennai
- Urban rail transit in India
- List of metro systems
