= Haliç (disambiguation) =

Haliç is the Turkish name for the Golden Horn.

Haliç may also refer to:

- Haliç, a village in Turkey
- Haliç University, a university in Turkey
- Haliç Bridge (disambiguation)
- Haliç (Istanbul Metro)

== See also ==
- Khalij (disambiguation)
