= Kodambakkam metro station =

Upcoming Chennai Metro's Yellow Line metro station

Kodambakkam

General information
- Coordinates: 13.05251°N 80.23121°E
- System: Chennai Metro station
- Owner: Chennai Metro Rail Limited (CMRL)
- Operator: Chennai Metro
- Line: Yellow Line
- Platforms: Island platform Platform-1 → Lighthouse; Platform-2 → Poonamallee Bypass
- Tracks: 2
- Connections: Kodambakkam

Construction
- Structure type: Underground, Double track
- Platform levels: 2
- Accessible: Yes

Other information
- Status: Under Construction

History
- Opening: June 2028; 20 months' time (TBC)
- Electrified: Single phase 25 kV, 35 Hz AC through overhead catenary

Services
Preceding station	Chennai Metro	Following station
Kodambakkam Powerhouse towards Poonamallee Bypass	Yellow Line (Under Construction)	Panagal Park towards Lighthouse
Kodambakkam Powerhouse towards Parandur Airport	Yellow Line (Future Service)	Panagal Park towards Lighthouse
Route map
Location

Kodambakkam is an upcoming underground metro station on the East-West Corridor of the Yellow Line of Chennai Metro in Chennai, India. This metro station will be among the 30 stations of Corridor IV and 12 underground stations along Corridor IV of the Chennai Metro, Poonamallee Bypass–Lighthouse stretch. This metro station is a key station in Yellow Line having Chennai Suburban Railway station connectivity. It is slated to be operational December 2027 along with remaining underground stations in yellow line till Light house.

== History ==
In February 2021, Chennai Metro Rail Limited (CMRL) invited bids for the construction of this Kodambakkam metro station situated on the underground section stretching from Kodambakkam Flyover to Boat Club, which also forms a part of Corridor 4 under Phase 2 of the Chennai Metro network.

Apart from this metro station, this package includes four other stations, namely Kodambakkam Flyover, Panagal Park, Nandanam, and Boat Club. The group of bidders participated in this package as well, namely ITD Cementation India Ltd., Larsen & Toubro (L&T), Gulermak, Shanghai Tunnel Engineering Co. Ltd. (STEC), and a joint venture of J Kumar Infraprojects–Patel Infrastructure.

Upon evaluation, ITD Cementation India Ltd., submitted the most favorable bid in both technical and financial terms and was consequently awarded the contract. They commenced underground construction in accordance with the approved execution framework, marking another milestone in the progress of Corridor 4. The tunneling work from Panagal Park to Kodambakkam station is completed by March 2025.

== Station layout ==
Station Layout - To Be Confirmed

G	Street level	Exit/Entrance
L1	Mezzanine	Fare control, station agent, Ticket/token, shops
L2	Platform 1 Eastbound	Towards → Lighthouse; Next Station: Panagal Park
L2	Island platform | Doors will open on the right
L2	Platform 2 Westbound	Towards ← Poonamallee Bypass ** Next Station: Kodambakkam Powerhouse
L2	Note:	** (Further extension to Parandur Airport in the future)

== See also ==
- List of Chennai metro stations
- Railway stations in Chennai
- Transport in Chennai
- Urban rail transit in India
- List of metro systems
