= Khalij =

Khalij is an Arabic word meaning a "gulf" and may refer to:

- the Persian Gulf, located between Iran and the Arabian Peninsula
- The Khalij (or Khalij al-Misri), a former canal in Cairo, Egypt
- the Khalij el-Arab or Arab's Gulf, a large bay to the west of Alexandria in Egypt
- the Khalīj 'Adan or Gulf of Aden, a gulf between Yemen and Somalia
- the Khalij Qabis or Gulf of Gabès, a gulf on the eastern coast of Tunisia
- Khalij (album), a 1990 album by Iranian singer Ebi

== See also ==
- Haliç (disambiguation)
