= Onur Aydın (footballer) =

Turkish footballer

Personal information
- Full name: Onur Aydın
- Date of birth: January 13, 1988 (age 38)
- Place of birth: Eminönü, Istanbul, Turkey
- Position: Forward

Team information
- Current team: Alibeyköy

Youth career
- 2001–2002: T. Tayfun
- 2002–2007: Kasımpaşa

Senior career*
Years	Team	Apps	(Gls)
2007–2012	Kasımpaşa	3	(0)
2008–2009	→ Alibeyköyspor (loan)	20	(3)
2009–2010	→ Darıca Gençlerbirliği (loan)	28	(9)
2011–2012	→ Bayrampaşa (loan)		
2012–2013	Keçiörengücü		
2013	Derincespor		
2013–2014	Adıyamanspor	13	(3)
2015	Ciksalinspor	3	(0)
2014–2015	Nilüferspor	6	(0)
2015	Dersimspor	12	(6)
2015	Ergene Velimese		
2015–2016	Halide Edip Adivarspor		
2016	Derincespor	2	(1)
2016–	Alibeyköy		
- * Club domestic league appearances and goals as of 3 August 2015

Onur Aydın (born 13 January 1988) is a Turkish professional football forward who is playing for Alibeyköy.
