= Eminönü =

- Quarter
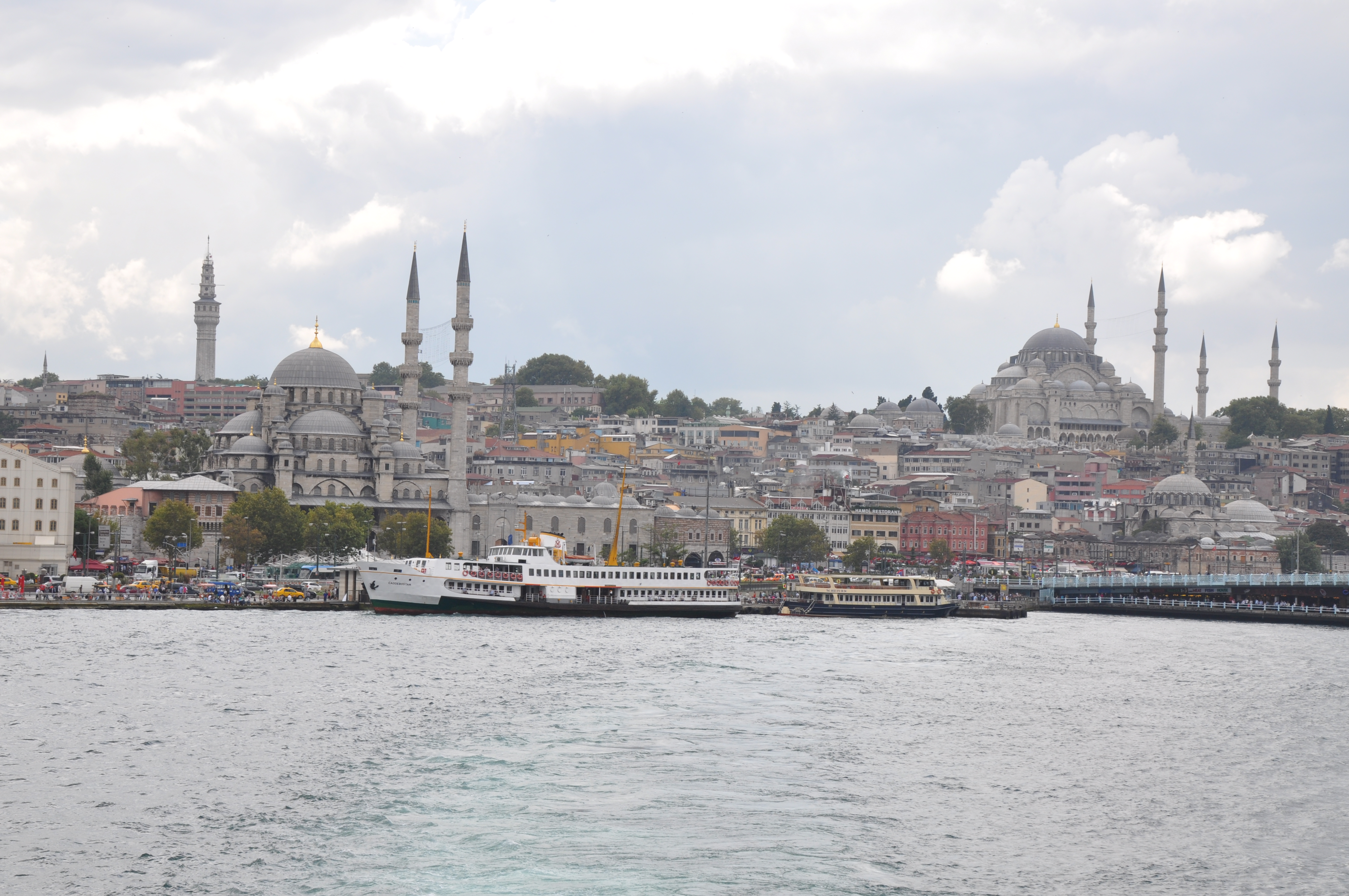
- The New Mosque (1665) in Eminönü, seen from the Golden Horn in Istanbul

- Location within Istanbul
- Coordinates: 41°01′02″N 28°58′16″E
- Country: Turkey
- Region: Marmara
- Province: Istanbul
- District: Fatih
- Time zone: UTC+3 (TRT)

Eminönü, historically known as Pérama, is a predominantly commercial waterfront area of Istanbul within the Fatih district near the confluence of the Golden Horn with the southern entrance of the Bosphorus strait and the Sea of Marmara. It is located in the part of Istanbul known as the historical peninsula, connected to Karaköy (historic Galata) via the Galata Bridge across the Golden Horn. It was administered as part of the Sultanahmet district from 1928 to 2009 when Sultanahmet was absorbed into Fatih. Eminönü, which was a district municipality until March 7, 2008, was abolished on this date and connected to Fatih district by law. It is completely located within the city wall, the historical core of the city, and forms one of the most vibrant areas of the central area.

Eminönü's busy main square is overlooked by the New Mosque (Yeni Cami in Turkish) and the Spice Bazaar (Mısır Çarşısı in Turkish).

Eminönü is an important transport hub. Several ferries have terminals along the Eminönü waterfront and the T1 tram has a stop here.

To the southeast Eminönü runs into Sirkeci, while to the northwest it merges with the shopping areas of Tahtakale and Küçükpazar. Inland from Eminönü is another shopping district, Mahmutpaşa. During the period when it was a district, it was the smallest district of Istanbul after Adalar in terms of area.

== Meaning of the name ==
During the Ottoman period, it was named Eminönü due to the presence of Maritime Customs and Customs Eminence here. In Turkish, Eminönü means 'in front of justice' ('emin' meaning 'justice' and 'önü' meaning 'in front of'). The name probably came from the Ottoman courts and customs houses on the docks; "Emin" was the title of an Ottoman customs official. During the Ottoman period, it was named Eminönü due to the presence of Maritime Customs and Customs Eminence here, and together with Fatih district, it became the central district of Istanbul in the early years of the republic. During the period when it was a district, it was the smallest district of Istanbul after Adalar in terms of area.

== History ==
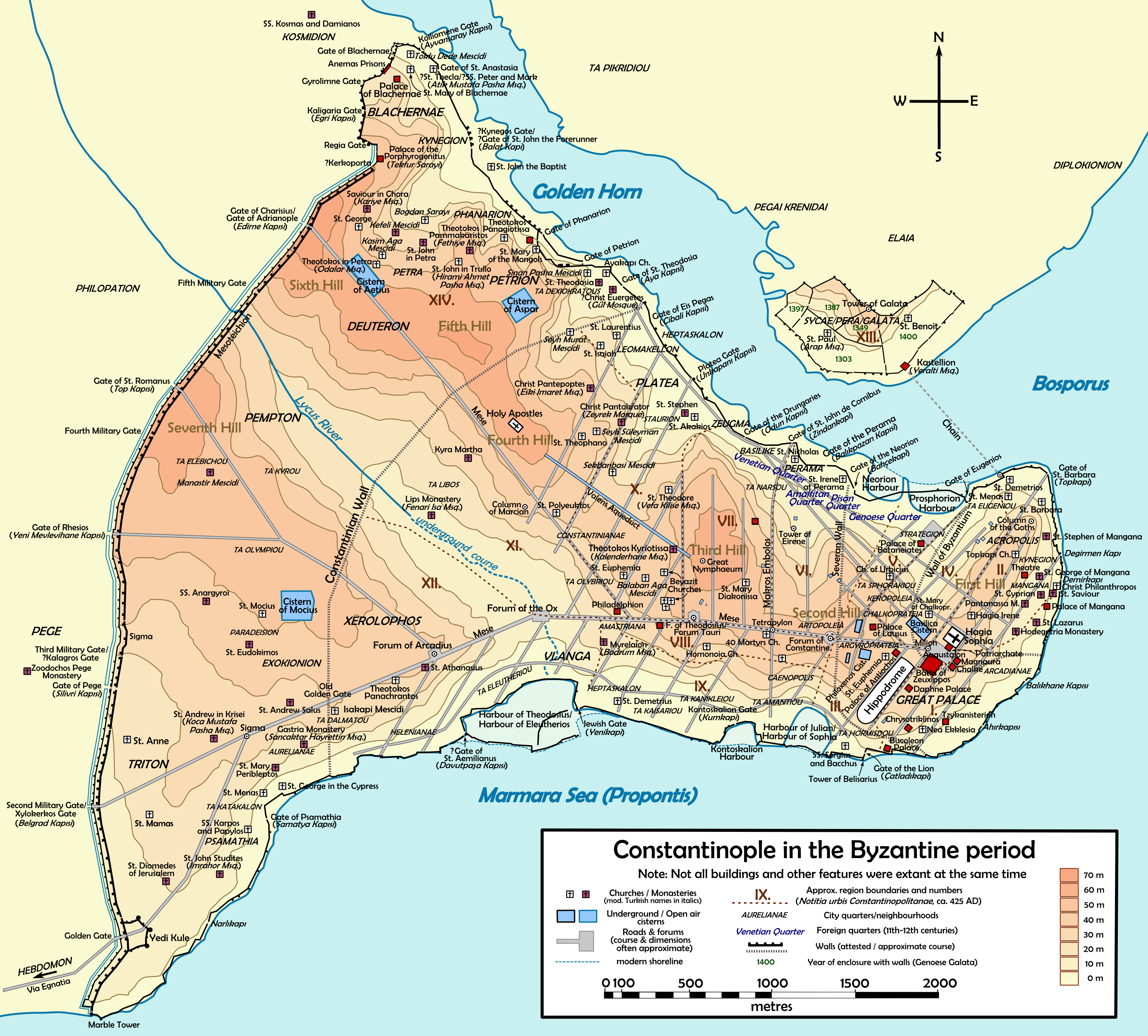
Map of the city in the Byzantine period

Eminönü's position on the Golden Horn made it a natural port, with the peninsula above it being eminently defensible. It was this location that led to the foundation of Byzantium, and from here that the city grew, with the oldest neighbourhoods being the port districts along the Golden Horn. By the 12th century, merchants from Venice, Amalfi, Genoa and Pisa had also settled in the area, acquiring their own wharfs and waterfront districts.

In the Byzantine period, the modern area of Eminönü included the districts of Neórion (after the harbor located there), Akrópolis, Kynégion, Arcadianae/Arkadianaí, ta Hormísdou, Amantíou, Caenopolis/Kainópolis ("New City"), ta Kanikleíou, ta Narsoú, ta Kaisaríou, Artopoleía (the "bakeries"), Argyroprateía (the "silver vendors"), Chalkoprateía (the "bronze vendors"), ta Olybríou, Constantinianae/Konstantinianaí, ta Amastrianón, Eugeníou, Pérama ("Crossing", the place where the ferry to Galata sailed), Zeúgma, Stauríon, Vlánga, Heptáskalon.

It is understood from the sources that the district was the coastal and harbor area between the “Neorin Gate” (Başce Gate) and the “Porta Drungari” (Wood Gate) during the Byzantine period. Dec. It is believed that the first place where Byzantion was founded was around the present-day Topkapı Palace, as well as Sarayburnu and Sirkeci regions. It is known that the Sirkeci - Eminönü coast, starting from the west of Sarayburnu, is completely a port, and the section where Sirkeci Station is located was filled later. In the Byzantine period, the northern parts of today's Sirkeci and Cağaloğlu were called “Eugeniu”. The area is just outside the walls of Byzantion, which should be where the walls surrounding the Topkapı Palace are located today; Septimus Severus was staying inside the wall.

During the Byzantine Empire, the Port of Neorion was filled up over time, cleaned out by emperor Leontios in 697, and a plague epidemic claimed to be caused by the slag extracted during this time ravaged the city. 10. after a century, the Latin colonies, especially the Genoese and Pisans, obtained privileged areas around Eminönü - Sirkeci and settled here and established their own commercial wharves in the port.

Bahçekapı Dec., located between Eminönü and Sirkeci, just behind the New Mosque, takes its name from the “Garden Gate”, one of the gates of Istanbul's sea walls that opens to the mouth of the Golden Horn. It is stated that in the Byzantine period this door was called “Porta Neorion”. Since Jews constituted the majority of the population around this gate at that time, the gate was called “Porta Hebraica” or “Porta Judeca”, and it was called Çifit Gate (Şuhut Gate) by the Turks. It is rumored that there was a tower near this gate in the Byzantine period, one end of the chain stretched to the mouth of the Golden Horn was connected to the tower and the other end to the Galata Tower. It is believed that the location of the gate is on Arpacılar Street behind today's New Mosque.

Eminönü's appearance changed significantly in the 16th and 17th centuries with the creation of the New Mosque (completed in 1591) and the Spice Bazaar which was built in 1660 as a sale outlet for goods imported overland from Egypt. Nearby in Tahtakale, the Rüstem Paşa Mosque was designed for a grand vizier in the middle of the 16th century. To make space for the New Mosque a community of Jews was moved out of Eminönu and relocated in Hasköy on the other side of the Golden Horn.

Eminönü was still a thriving port area in Ottoman times, occupied by importers, warehousemen, sailors and traders of every description, with a labyrinth of narrow streets, workshops and markets leading uphill to Topkapı Palace, the Ottoman administrative centre. Many early stone hans (caravanserais) still survive in Tahtakale.

Improved transport connections greatly altered Eminönü in the 19th century. In 1841 the first permanent Galata Bridge across the Golden Horn linked Eminönü more closely to Karaköy where steamships docked, while the Orient Express train service from Europe terminated at nearby Sirkeci Station from 1888.

During the WWI, Eminönü suffered due to the bombing of Istanbul in 1918.

Towards the end of the Ottoman era many grand stone buildings were built in the area between Eminönü and Sirkeci. Among them were the Grand Post Office and some commercial buildings like the Istanbul 4th Vakıf Han.

In the early days of the Republic of Turkey, Eminönü was extensively reconfigured. The tollbooths at the end of the Galata Bridge were cleared away to create a large square in front of the New Mosque and a road was built to link the waterfront with the new Atatürk Bridge at Unkapanı. The coast road was later extended on reclaimed land to run around Sarayburnu and out to Atatürk Airport.

== Port ==
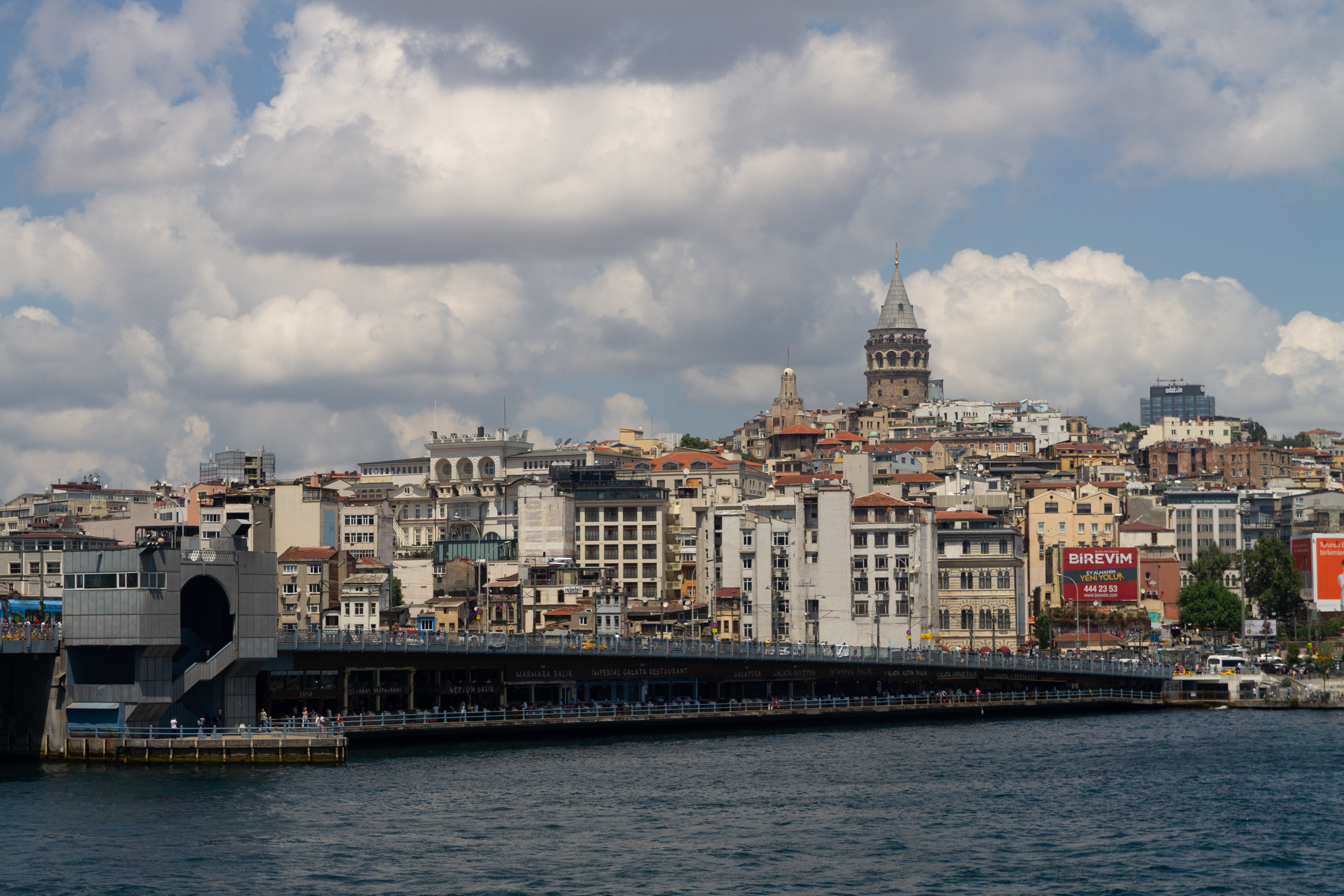
Galata Bridge

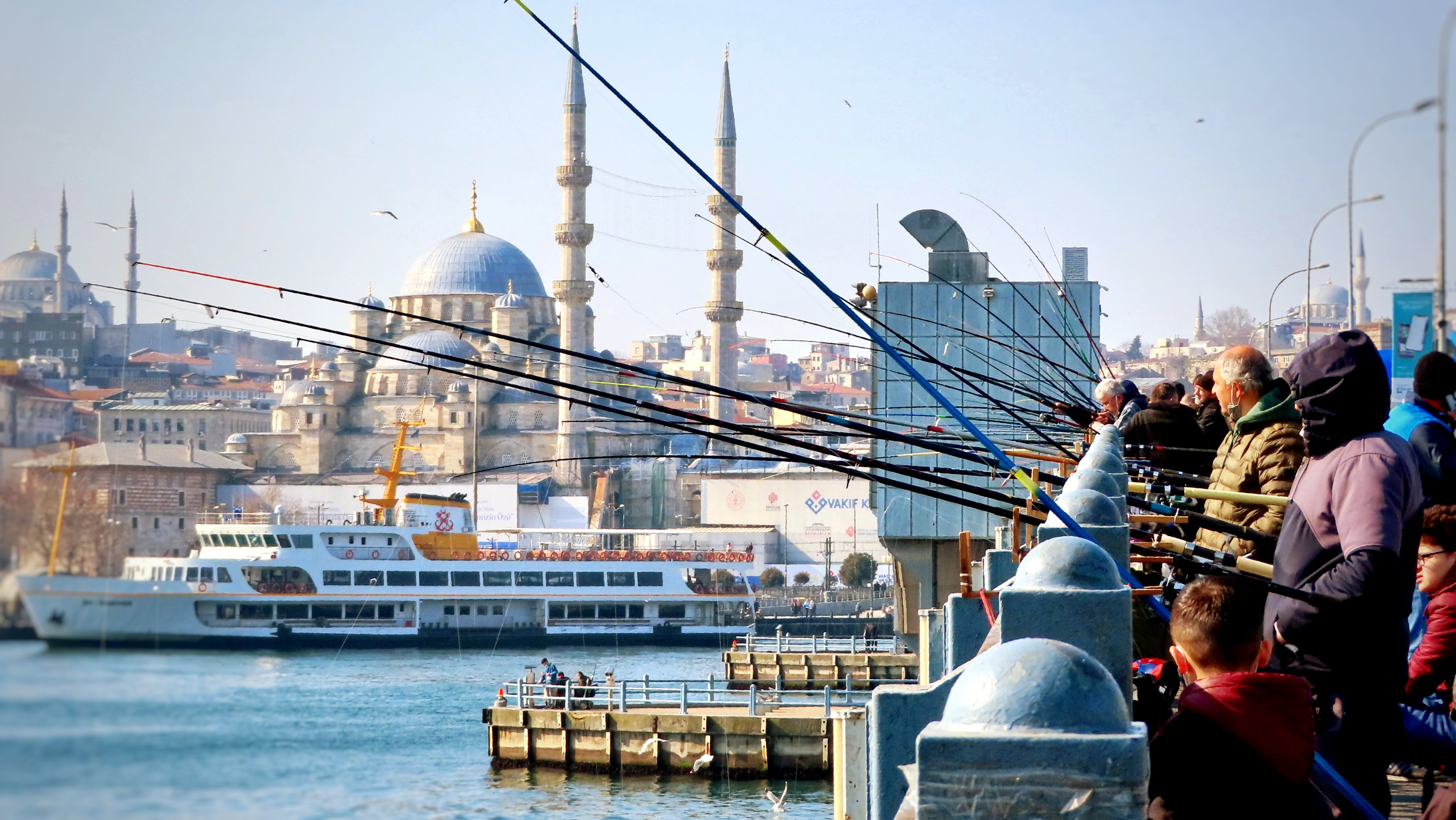
Fishers on Galata Bridge

At the entrance to the Golden Horn of Istanbul, Eminönü district forms an important part of the port, which has existed since the city was founded, together with Sirkeci. This district, which is an important focus of urban life as well as the center of one of the most important ports in the world, covers the coastline starting from the Eminönü Campus of Istanbul Commerce University located on Unkapanı road, continuing with the building of the Istanbul Chamber of Commerce and extending to Sirkeci and the bazaar area just behind it.

== Eminönü today ==
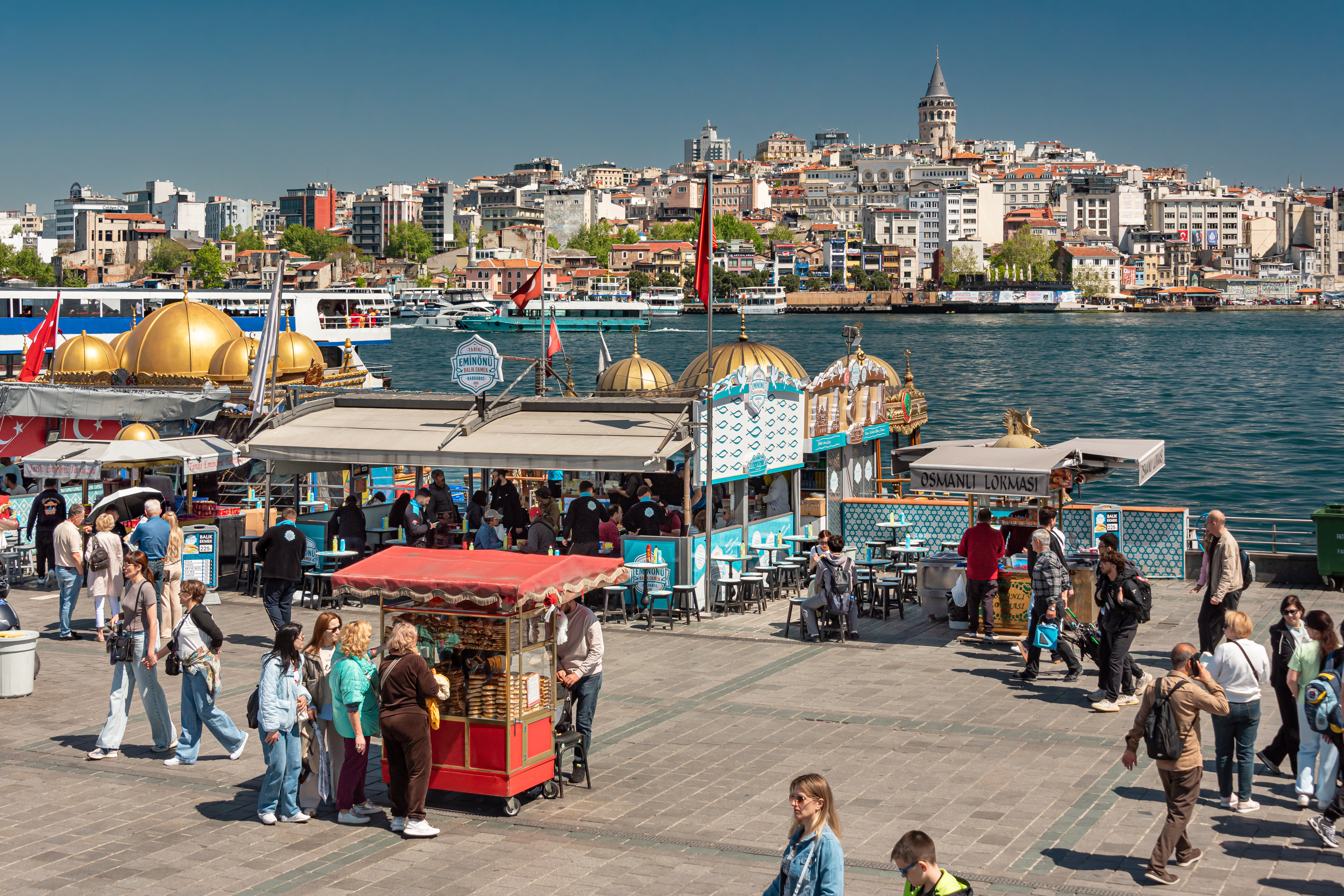
Eminönü Square with fish boats and Galata Tower

Eminönü is home to the busiest ferry crossings for the Bosphorus and the Marmara Sea as well as to the car ferry across the Bosphorus to Harem. The Sirkeci Railway Station (where trains can be caught to Bucharest) is nearby. The T1 tram from Kabataş to Bağcılar also passes through Eminönü.

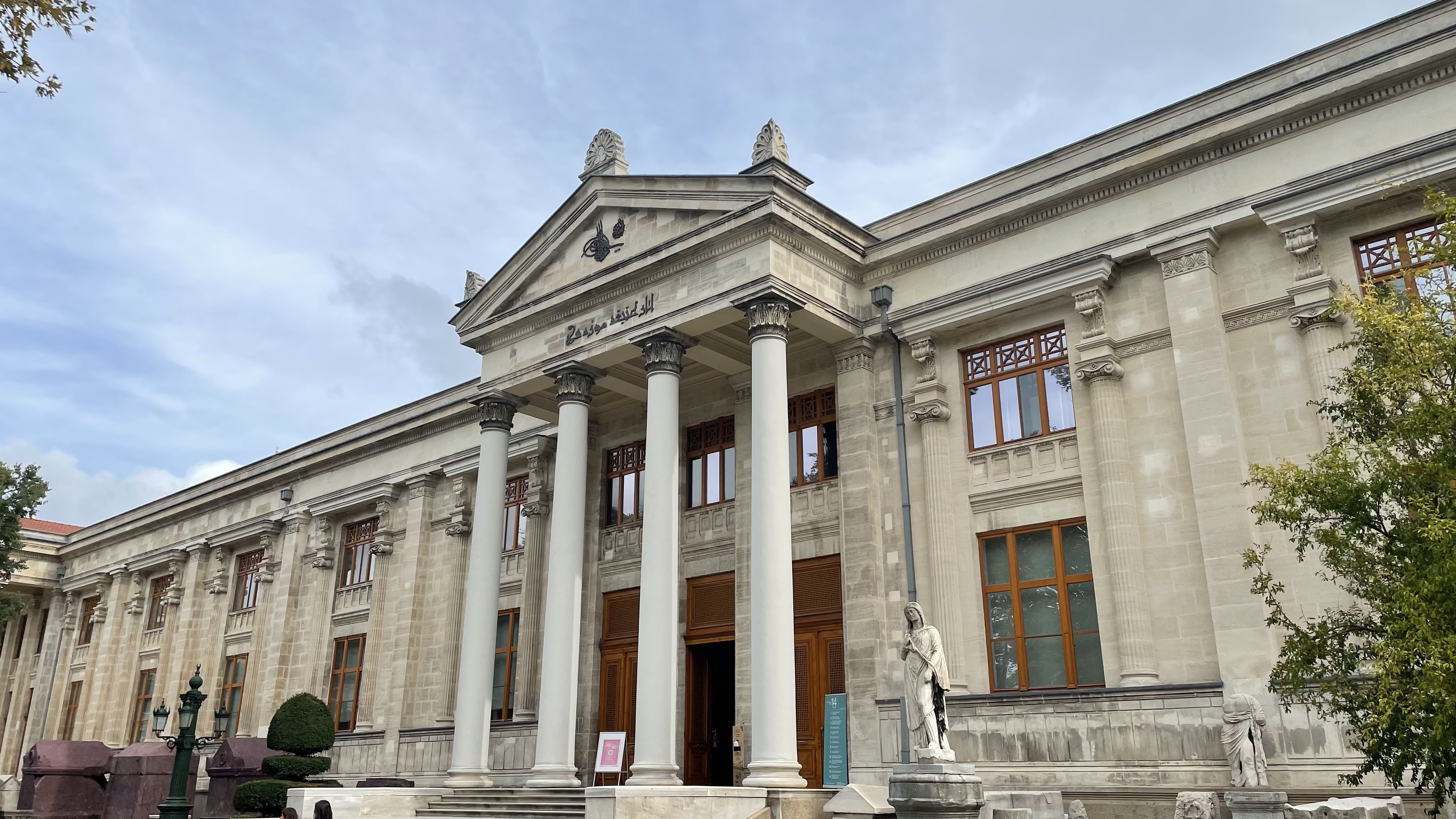
Istanbul Archaeology Museums

There is some housing in Eminönü but most of the buildings are offices, shops and workshops. At night it is a quiet place. Every day roughly two million people work in or pass through Eminönü, but the district has only 30,000 residents. The people that do live in Eminönü are mainly working class and conservative.

In the late 2010s, work began on restoring the Yeni Mosque and the Spice Bazaar. Work was still continuing on the Yeni Mosque in 2022.

== Landmarks ==
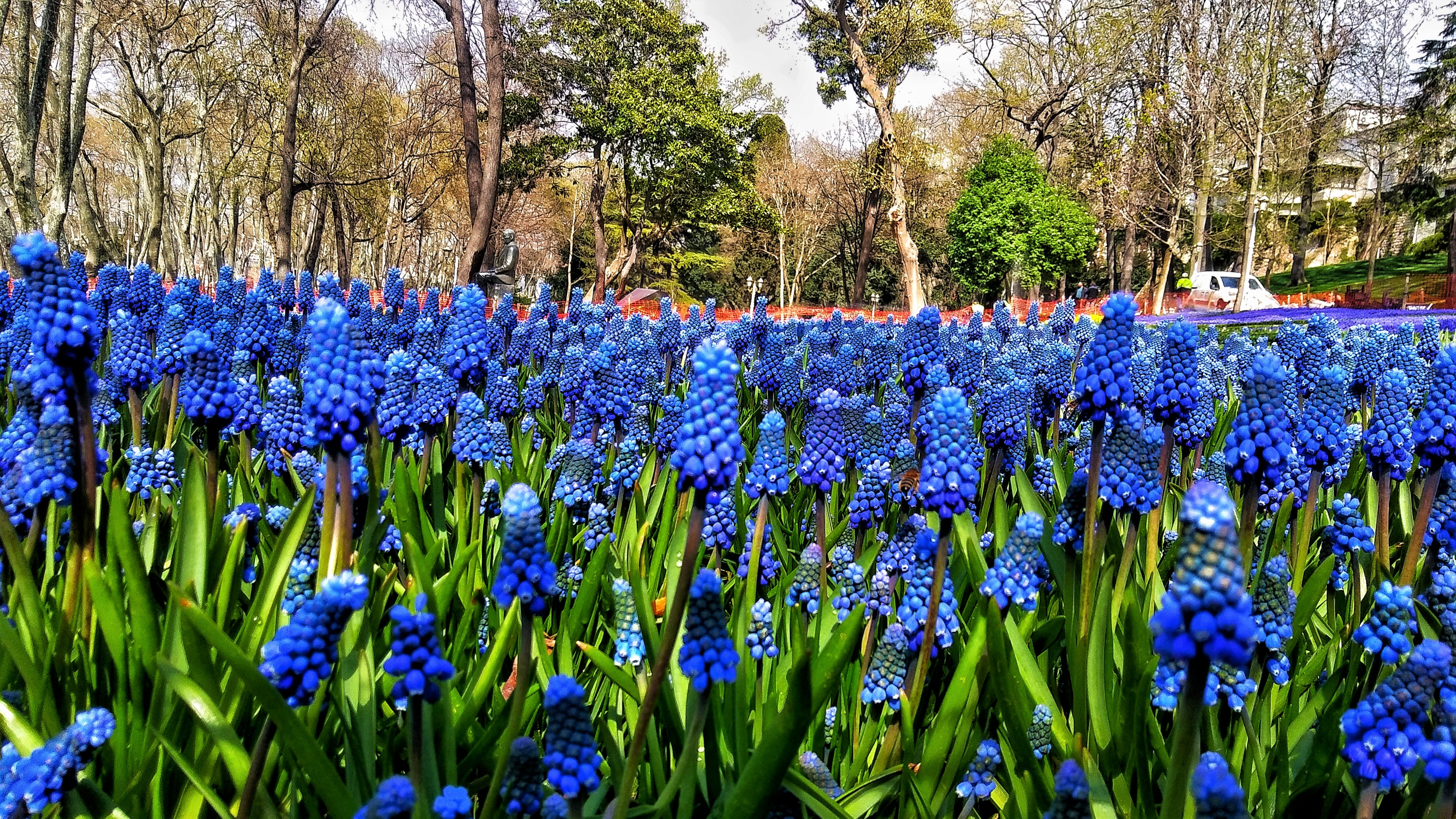
Gülhane Park

Eminönü has several historical mosques and buildings:

- New Mosque (Yeni Cami) - the mosque that dominates the waterfront by the Galata Bridge; there is an open space in front where people feed the pigeons.
- Galata Bridge: fishing is popular on the bridge between Eminönü and Karaköy and it connects the two sides of the Golden Horn. Nice restaurants are located on the coastal area and underneath the bridge.
- Spice Bazaar - beside the Yeni Mosque and facing the water, the Spice Bazaar increasingly sells a range of tourist merchandise as well as the traditional spices.
- Gülhane Park: It is one of the most popular parks in Istanbul with its gardens, resting places, flowers and pools. You can sit in the park, which was used to grow roses for the Topkapı Palace during the Ottoman period, get away from the noise of the city and relax.
- Istanbul 4th Vakıf Han, a former office building redeveloped to the five-star Legacy Ottoman Hotel
- Tomb of Sultan Abdülhamid I
- İşbank Museum
- Tomb of Hatice Turhan Sultan
- Rüstem Pasha Mosque
- New mosque: mosque, which has a large courtyard, attracts the attention of tourists with both its architecture and interior decoration. The interior of the mosque is decorated with turquoise and white colored motifs and Iznik tiles.
- Eminönü square

== Commerce ==
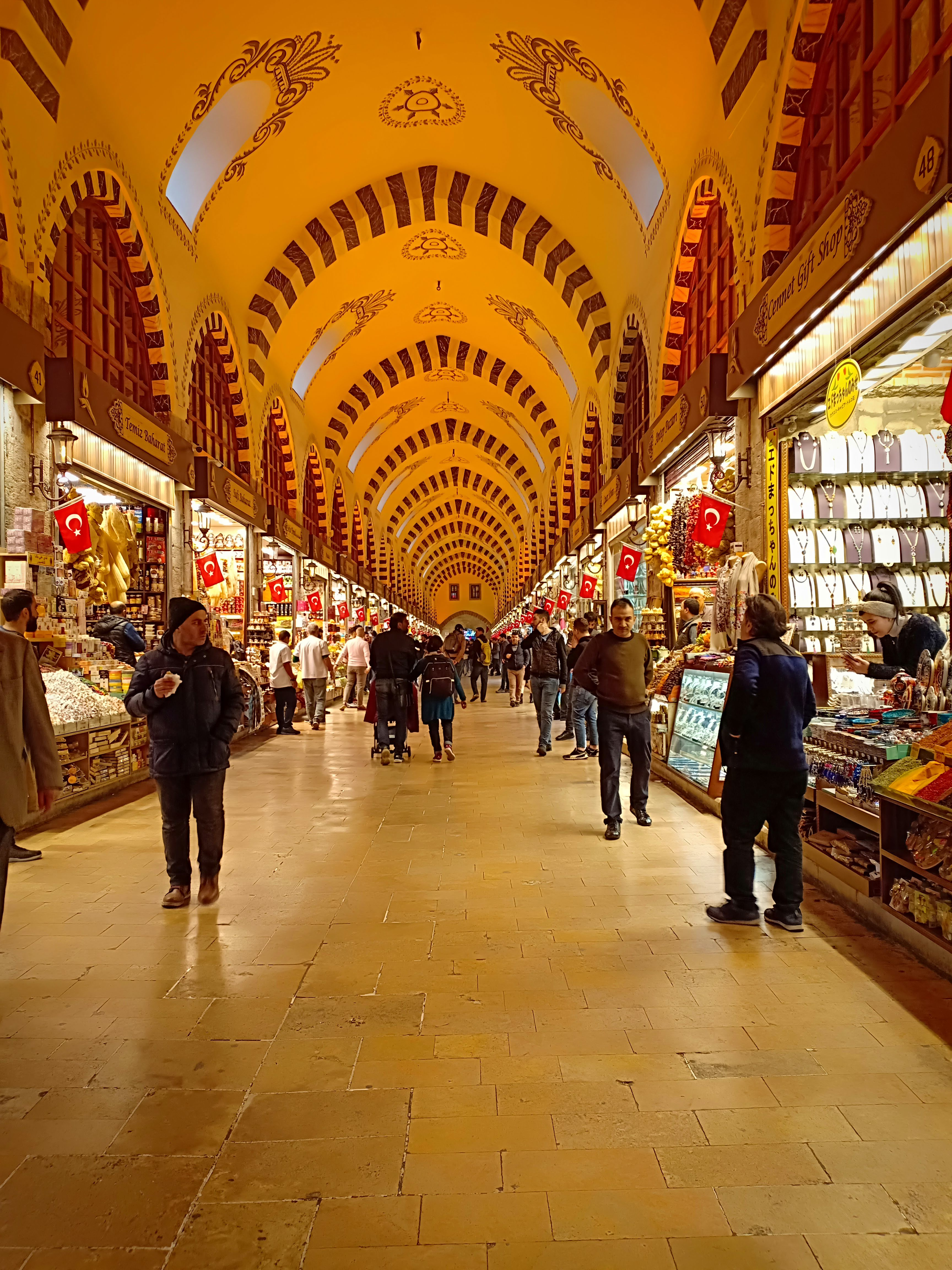
View in Spice Bazaar

Eminönü used to be well known for the grilled mackerel sandwiches sold from boats moored by the Galata Bridge. The authorities have tried to close them down although in 2022 three were still hanging on.

The enclosed Spice Bazaar is the most prominent place to shop, with stalls selling tourist merchandise increasingly squeezing out the traditional spice booths. On one side outdoor stalls sell pets and garden items, on the other they sell cheese, sweets, and fruit and vegetables.

The hill running up to Mahmutpaşa is lined with shops selling household goods, clothes and circumcision outfits for young boys.

The hans of Tahtakale sell everything from household goods and delicatessen items to freshly ground coffee and packaging.

Heading inland towards Sirkeci there are many shops selling photographic equipment, bicycles, and stationery.

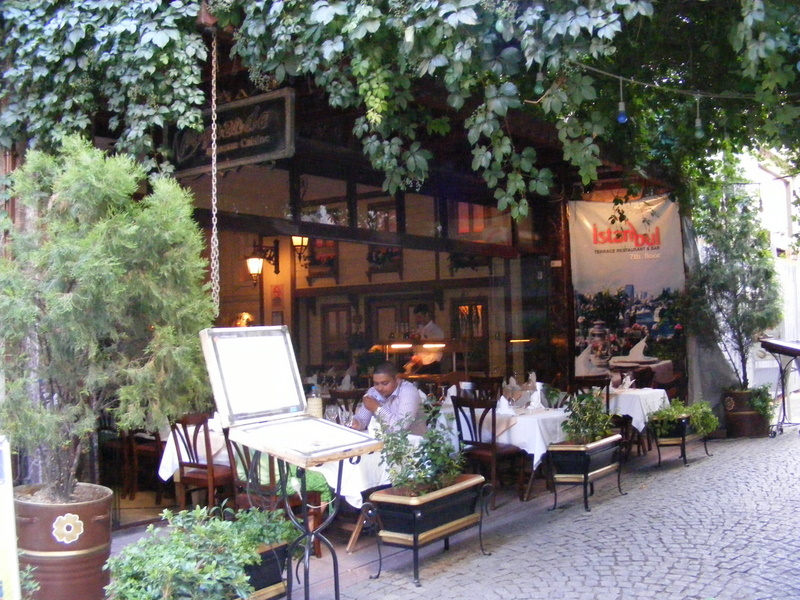
A restaurant in Eminönü

== In popular culture ==
The following movies have scenes taking place in Eminönü:

- Skyfall (2012)
- Taken 2 (2012)
- Argo (2012)

== Notable people ==
- Onur Aydın (born 1988), footballer

== Gallery ==
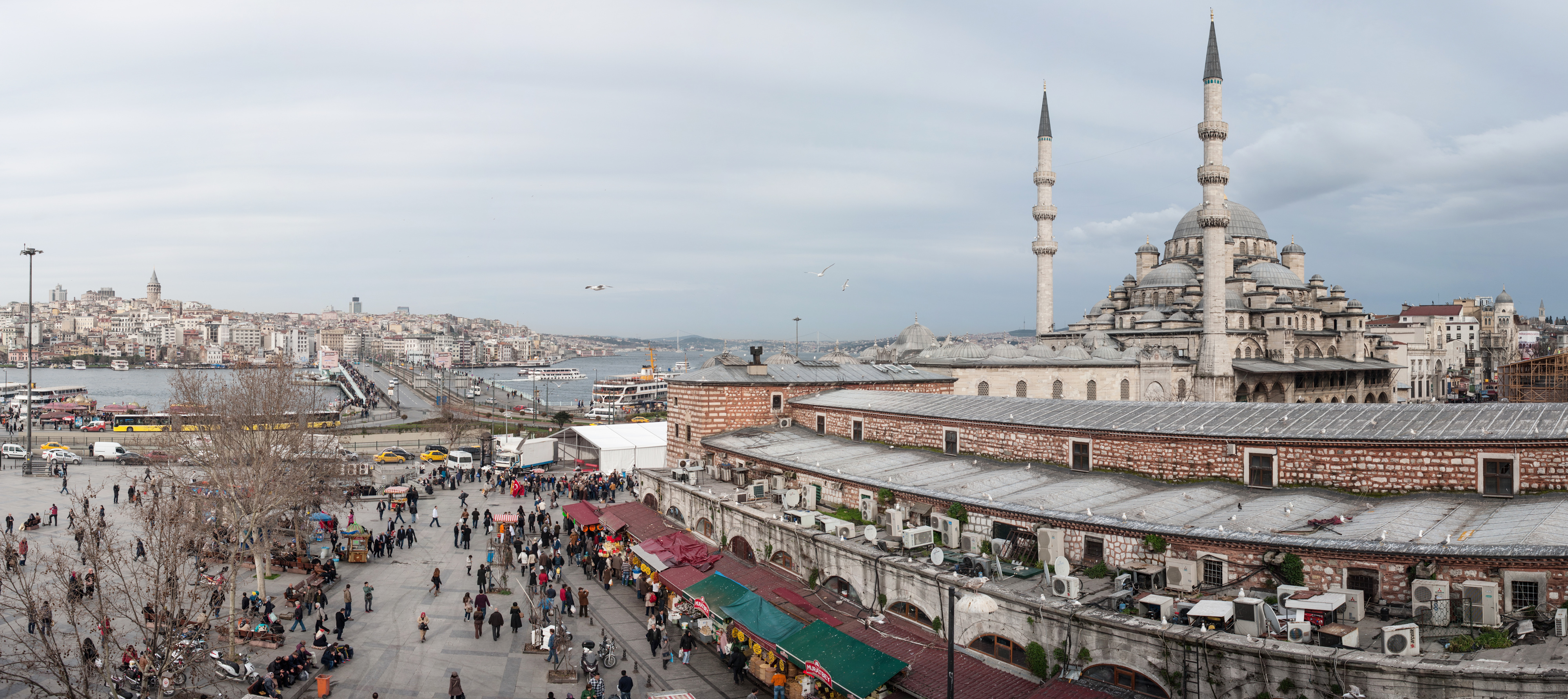
Panoramic view of Eminonu (New Mosque)
