= Hakan Kıran =

Turkish architect

M. Hakan Kıran
- Born: 1962 (age 63–64); Ankara, Turkey
- Education: Mimar Sinan Fine Arts University
- Occupation: Architect
- Awards: 2001 International Property Award for Mixed-use Architecture
- Design: Mydonose Showland; Rings Istanbul; Golden Horn Metro Bridge

M. Hakan Kıran (born 1962) is a Turkish architect, noted for his buildings in Istanbul. He is probably best known for designing the Golden Horn Metro Bridge with Michel Virlogeux, in which he was responsible for the architectural design and the construction supervision. He founded Hakan Kiran Architecture and Building Services in 1989.

== Early years ==
Born 1962 in Ankara, Hakan Kıran grew up in a mining town, which was constructed by the French. The extraordinary concept of his hometown impressed him. Much liked the town's planning, he steered for studying architecture.

In 1980, he entered State Academy of Fine Arts in Istanbul (Turkish: İstanbul Devlet Güzel Sanatlar Akademisi, İDGSA), today Mimar Sinan Fine Arts University to study architecture. After graduation in 1989, Kıran made a Master's degree ln art restoration at his alma mater.

During his education and some time after, he worked in an architecture office and gained experience.

== Career ==
Hakan Kıran established his own office in 1989, and worked until 1998 on conservation projects of very important historical buildings.

His first main architectural design project was "Mydonose Showland" in 1998, an entertainment center in the form of a giant pyramid tent across Atatürk International Airport in Bakırköy district. However the complex, renamed later to Istanbul Show Center (Turkish: Istanbul Gösteri Merkezi), was demolished in 2009 after a fire destroyed it in April that year.

In 2004, he designed the Golden Horn Metro Bridge, which was commissioned by the Istanbul Metropolitan Municipality. The cable-stayed bridge has a swing bridge at one end and features a metro station in the middle. Its realization took almost ten years as a result of revisions needed to comply with UNESCO regulations requiring it not to disturb the old city's skyline.

He designed and built a project named "Larus Palas" worth US$30 million in the Göktürk neighborhood of Istanbul's Eyüp district, which was completed in 2013 and consists of 82 domiciles, 18 stores as well as facilities for sports, recreation and social activities.

== Family life ==
Hakan Kıran's wife Tülin is an interior architect, who works in her husband's practice. The Kırans have two daughters and a son.

== Awards ==
In 2011, Kıran won the "International Property Award for Mixed-use Architecture", organized jointly by Google and Bloomberg TV, for his design of the "Sancaktepe Rings Istanbul Shopping Mall & Residential Project", which features 1,500 domiciles, a shopping mall and social facilities built on 230,000 m^{2} (57 acres) in Sancaktepe district of Istanbul.
