= Haliç Bridge =

Haliç Bridge Haliç Köprüsü
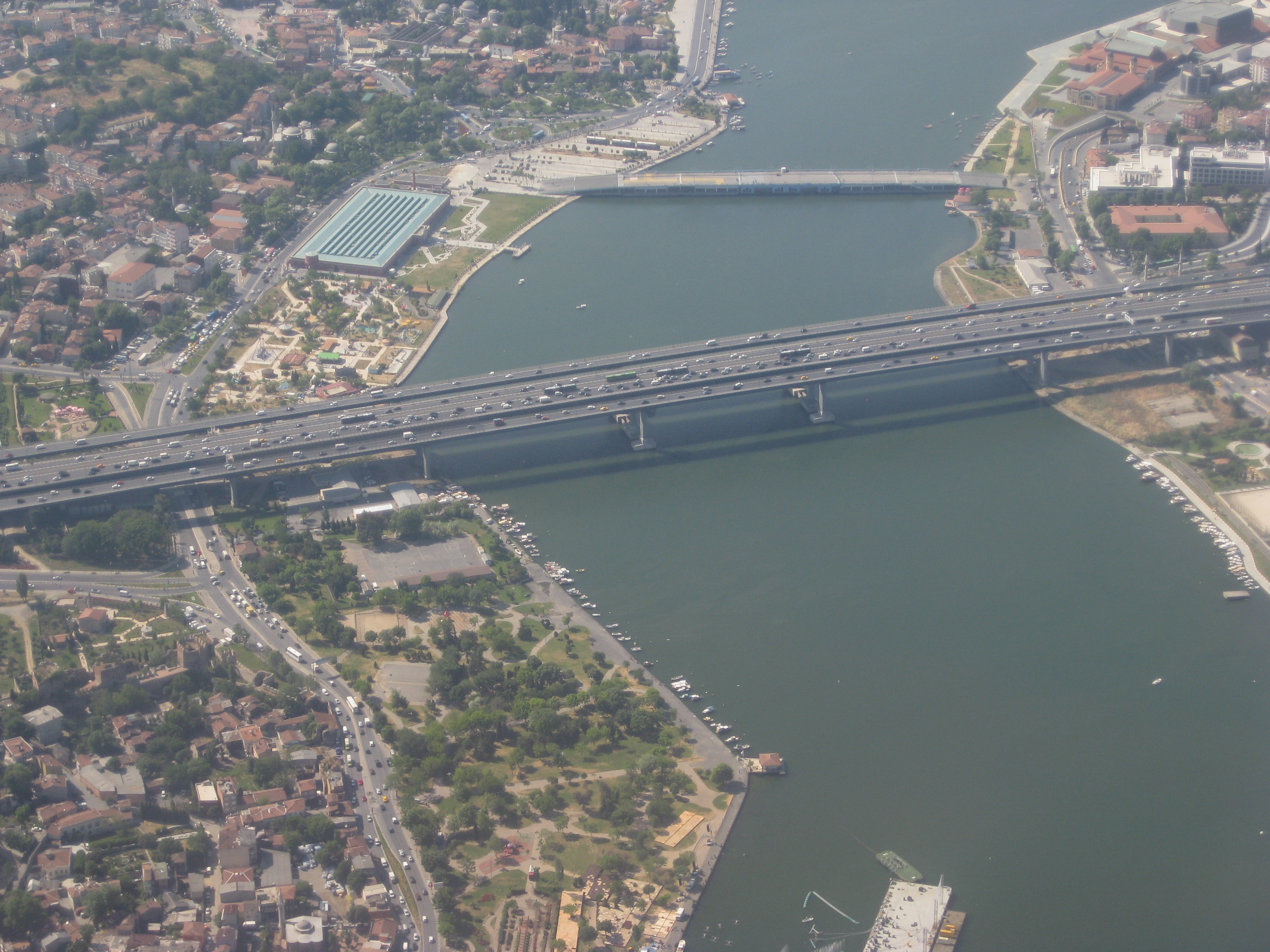
- Haliç Bridge on the Golden Horn
- Coordinates: 41°02′36″N 28°56′30″E
- Carries: 9 lanes of the O-1 motorway
- Crosses: Golden Horn
- Locale: Ayvansaray–Halıcıoğlu, Istanbul, Turkey
- Official name: Haliç Köprüsü
- Other name(s): Halic Bridge; Golden Horn Bridge
- Owner: Metropolitan Municipality of Istanbul

Characteristics
- Total length: 995 m (3,264 ft)
- Width: 32 m (105 ft)
- Height: 22 m (72 ft)

History
- Engineering design by: IHI Corporation; Julius Berger-Bauboag AG
- Construction start: 1971
- Construction end: 1974
- Opened: 10 September 1974

Location of Haliç Bridge in Istanbul

The Haliç Bridge (Turkish: Haliç Köprüsü), or the Golden Horn Bridge, is a road bridge across the Golden Horn in Istanbul, Turkey. It connects the neighbourhoods of Ayvansaray in the southwest and Halıcıoğlu in the northwest. The bridge carries the O-1 motorway, also known as the Istanbul Inner Beltway. It was constructed between 1971 and 1974, and entered service on 10 September 1974. The engineering work was carried out by IHI Corporation of Japan and Julius Berger-Bauboag AG of Germany. The bridge is 995 m (3,264 ft) long and 32 m (105 ft) wide, and stands 22 m (72 ft) above sea level.

== See also ==
- Atatürk Bridge
- Galata Bridge
- Golden Horn Metro Bridge
- Golden Horn
