= Atatürk Bridge =

Atatürk Bridge Atatürk Köprüsü
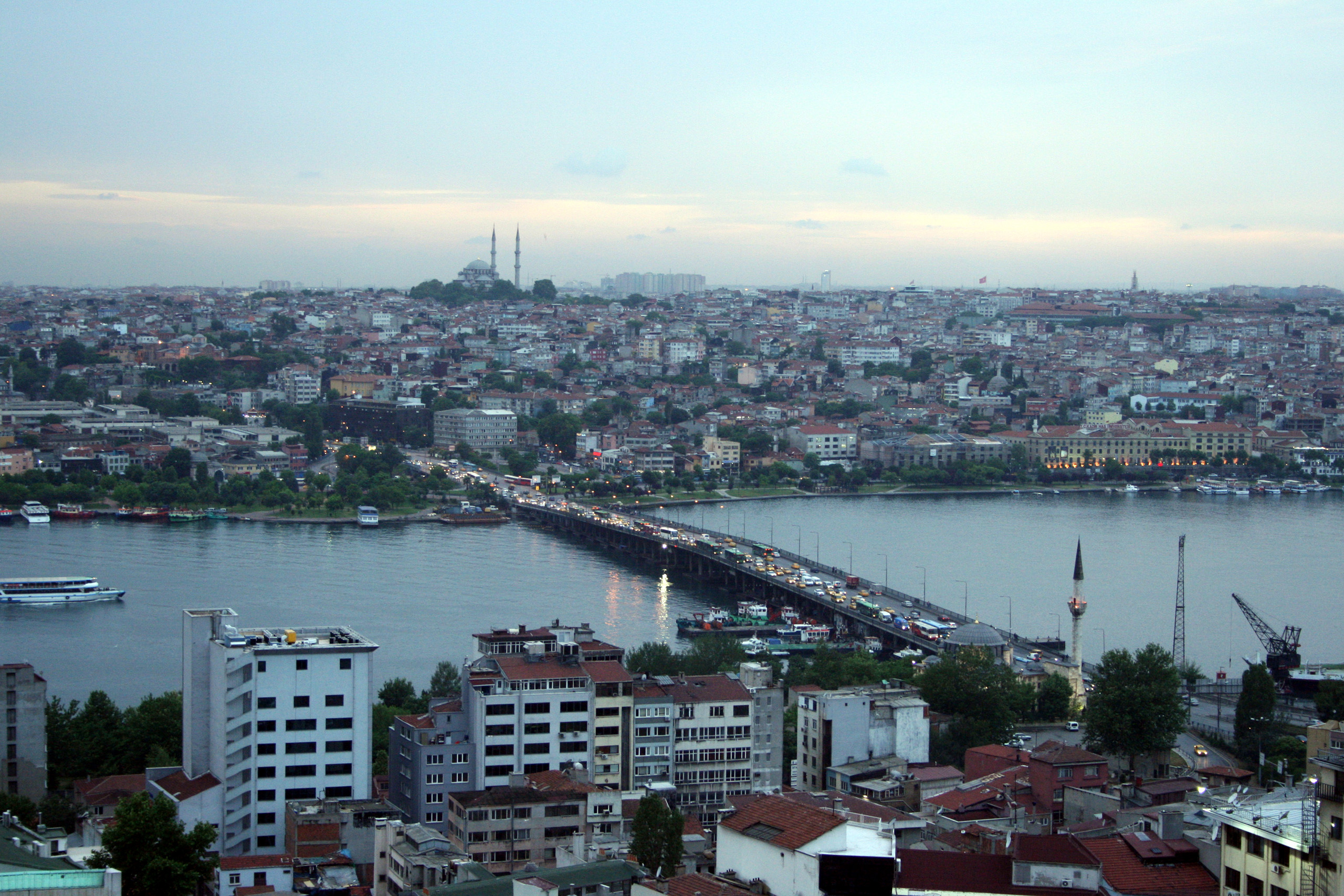
- Atatürk Bridge as seen from the Galata Tower
- Coordinates: 41°01′27.1″N 28°57′55.1″E
- Carries: 3 vehicular lanes and a sidewalk in each direction
- Crosses: Golden Horn
- Locale: Unkapanı–Azapkapı, Istanbul, Turkey
- Official name: Atatürk Köprüsü
- Other name(s): Ataturk Bridge; Unkapanı Bridge
- Owner: Metropolitan Municipality of Istanbul

Characteristics
- Total length: 477 m (1,565 ft)
- Width: 25 m (82 ft)

History
- Construction start: 1936
- Construction end: 1940
- Replaces: Third bridge (1912–1936); Second bridge (1875–1912); First bridge (1836–1875)

Atatürk Bridge (Turkish: Atatürk Köprüsü) is a road bridge across the Golden Horn in Istanbul, Turkey. It is named after Mustafa Kemal Atatürk, the founder and first President of the Republic of Turkey but is sometimes called the Unkapanı Bridge after the district on its western shore.

== History ==
Originally named the Hayratiye Bridge, it was commissioned by the reformist Ottoman Sultan Mahmud II and supervised by Ahmed Fevzi Pasha, the Deputy Admiral of the Ottoman Fleet. The work was completed in 1836 and connected Unkapanı on the western side of the Golden Horn with Azapkapı on the eastern side. The original bridge was about 400 metres (1,300 feet) long and 10 metres (33 feet) wide, and was built as a bascule bridge to accommodate the passage of large ships. Sultan Mahmud II attended the opening of the bridge in 1836, crossing over it on his horse.

In 1875 the original bridge was replaced by a second model, made of iron and constructed by a French company for the price of 135,000 Ottoman gold liras. It was 480 metres (1,570 feet) long and 18 metres (59 feet) wide, and remained in service from 1875 to 1912, when it was demolished.

In 1912, the nearby Third Galata Bridge was disassembled and reassembled on the site of the old Hayratiye Bridge, becoming the third bridge on the site. This bridge continued in use until 1936 when it was damaged by a storm.

The fourth and current bridge, renamed the Atatürk Bridge, was constructed between 1936 and 1940. It is 477 metres (1,565 feet) long and 25 metres (82 feet) wide.

In 2022 the Unkapanı access area was completely remodelled to allow the extension of the T5 tram from Alibeyköy to be extended from Cibali to Eminönü.

== See also ==
- Galata Bridge
- Haliç Bridge
- Golden Horn Metro Bridge
- Golden Horn
