= Galata Bridge =

Bridge that spans the Golden Horn in Istanbul, Turkey

Galata Bridge Galata Köprüsü
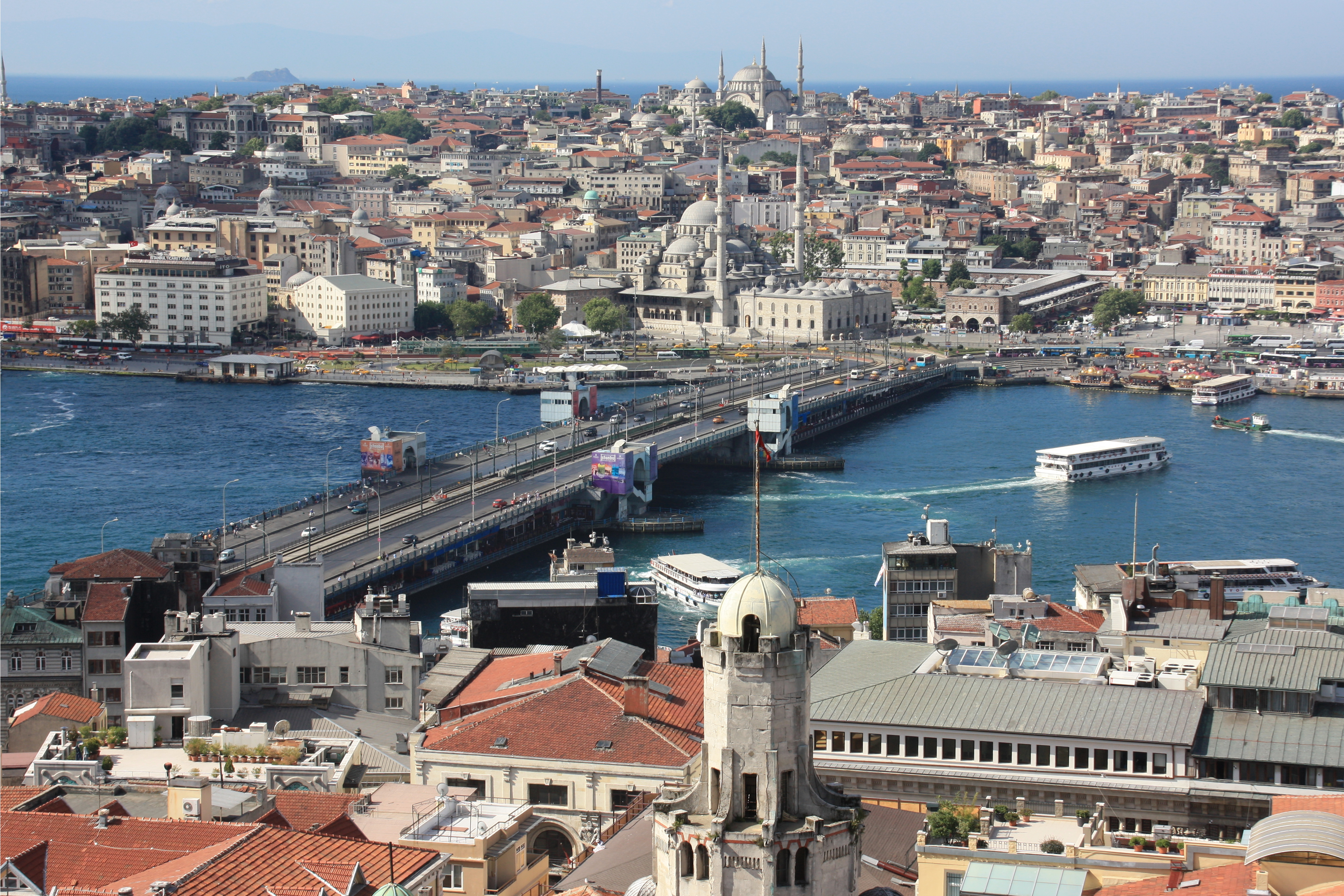
- Galata Bridge on the Golden Horn, with Eminönü in the background, as seen from the Galata Tower. The Yeni Mosque can be seen behind the bridge, in the background.
- Coordinates: 41°01′12″N 28°58′23″E
- Carries: 2 vehicular lanes, tram line and a sidewalk in each direction
- Crosses: Golden Horn
- Locale: Karaköy–Eminönü, Istanbul, Turkey
- Owner: Metropolitan Municipality of Istanbul

Characteristics
- Design: Bascule bridge
- Material: Concrete
- Total length: 490 m (1,610 ft)
- Width: 42 m (138 ft)
- Longest span: 80 m (260 ft)

History
- Designer: GAMB (Göncer Ayalp Engineering Co.)
- Engineering design by: STFA Construction Co.
- Construction start: 1992
- Construction end: December 1994
- Replaces: Fourth bridge (1912–1992); Third bridge (1875–1912); Second bridge (1863–1875); Cisr-i Cedid (1845–1863)

Location
- Interactive map of Galata Bridge

The Galata Bridge (Turkish: Galata Köprüsü, Turkish pronunciation: [ˈɡaɫata cœpɾyˈsy]) is a bridge that spans the Golden Horn in Istanbul, Turkey. From the end of the 19th century in particular, the bridge has featured in Turkish literature, theater, poetry and novels. The current Galata Bridge is just the latest in a series of bridges linking Eminönü in the Fatih district and Karaköy in Beyoğlu since the early 19th century. The current bridge, the fifth on the same site, was built in 1994.

The bridge was named after Galata (the former name for Karaköy) on the northern shore of the Golden Horn.

== History ==
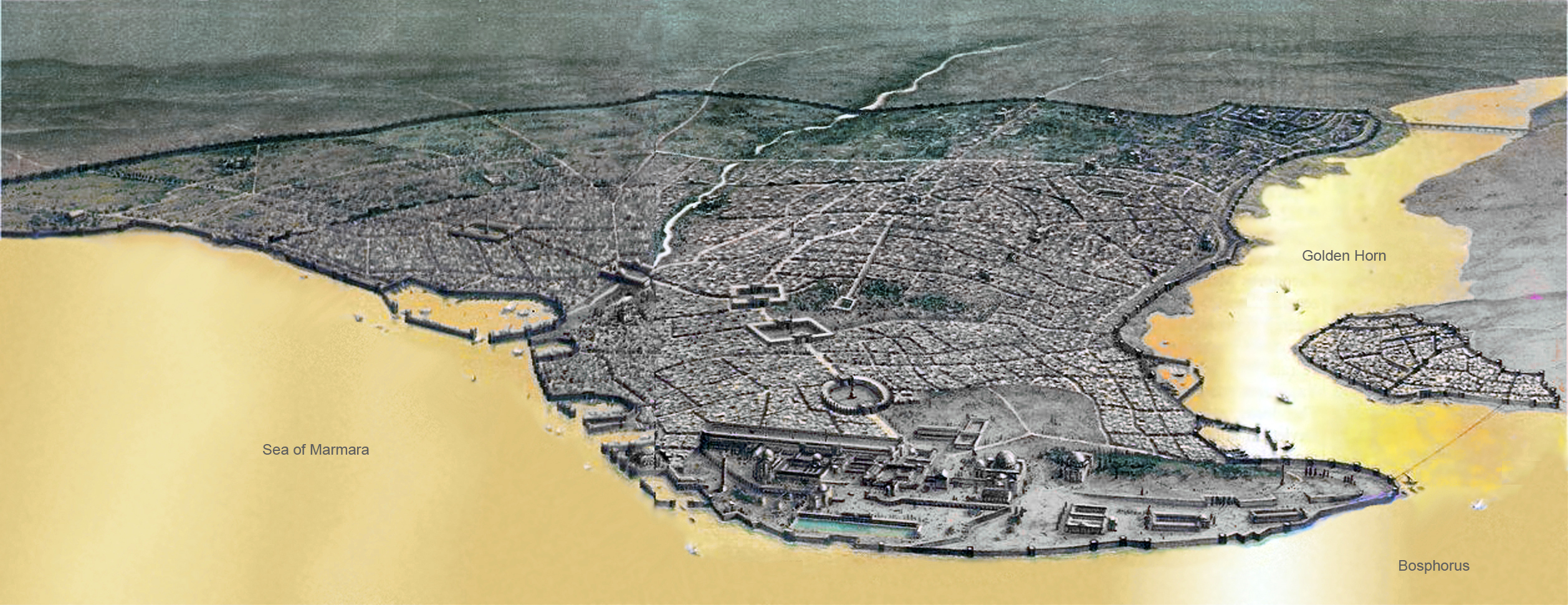
The first bridge on the Golden Horn, built by Justinian the Great, can be seen near the Theodosian Land Walls at the north-eastern end of the city in this rendering of old Constantinople.

The first recorded bridge over the Golden Horn was built during the reign of Justinian the Great in the 6th century, close to the area near the Theodosian Land Walls at the western end of the city.

In 1453, before the Fall of Constantinople, the Turks assembled a mobile bridge by placing their ships side-by-side across the water, so that their troops could move from one side of the Golden Horn to the other.

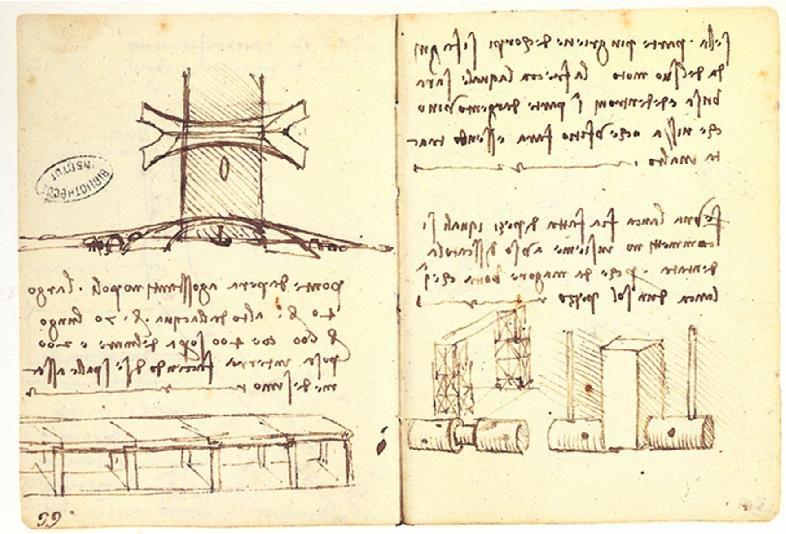
Golden Horn Bridge designed by Leonardo da Vinci in 1502

In 1502–1503, Sultan Bayezid II solicited plans for a bridge in the current location. Utilising three well-known geometrical principles, the pressed-bow, parabolic curve and keystone arch, artist Leonardo da Vinci designed an unprecedented single span 280 m (920 ft) long bridge across the Golden Horn, which, had it been constructed, would have become the longest bridge span in the world. However, the ambitious design was not approved by the Sultan.

Another Italian artist, Michelangelo, was also invited to contribute a design but rejected the proposal, and the idea of building a bridge across the Golden Horn was shelved until the 19th century.

During the bombing of Istanbul, the area was affected by the British bombs in 1918.

In 2001 a small-scale version of Leonardo's bridge design was constructed near Oslo, Norway by the contemporary artist Vebjørn Sand, the first civil engineering project based on a Leonardo sketch ever to be constructed.

=== Hayratiye bridge ===
In the early 19th century, Mahmud II (1808–1839) had a bridge built further up the Golden Horn, between Azapkapı and Unkapanı. This bridge, known as the Hayratiye (Benefaction in English), was opened on September 3, 1836. The project was carried out by Deputy Lord High Admiral Fevzi Ahmet Paşa using the workers and facilities of the naval arsenal at nearby Kasımpaşa. According to the History of Lutfi, this bridge was built on linked pontoons and was around 500–540 m (1,640–1,770 ft) long.

=== Cisr-i Cedid bridge ===
In 1845 the first Galata Bridge at the mouth of the waterway (i.e. on the current site) was constructed out of wood at the request of the Valide Sultan, the mother of Abd-ul-Mejid I (1839–1861). It was known as the Cisr-i Cedid (New Bridge) to distinguish it from the earlier bridge further up the Golden Horn, which became known as the Cisr-i Atik (Old Bridge). The Baedeker's guidebook also referred to it as the Sultan Valideh Bridge. It continued in use for 18 years.

On the Karaköy side of the bridge, an inscribed couplet by poet İbrahim Şinasi recorded that the New Bridge was built by Sultan Abdulmejid I who was the first to pass over it. The first to pass below it was the French captain Magnan in his ship the Cygne.

For the first three days, crossing the bridge was free. After that, a toll (mürüriye) was paid to the Naval Ministry. Toll-collecting started on November 25, 1845 and the following tolls were collected:

- Free: military and law enforcement personnel, fire fighters on duty, clergy,
- 5 para: pedestrians,
- 10 para: people with backpacks,
- 20 para: load-bearing animals,
- 100 para: horse carriages,
- 3 para: sheep, goats or other animals

Until 31 May 1930, this toll was collected by officials in white uniforms who stood at both ends of the bridge.

=== The second bridge ===
In 1863 this bridge was replaced by a second wooden bridge, built by Ethem Pertev Paşa on the orders of Sultan Abdulaziz (1861–1876) during the infrastructure improvements that preceded Napoleon III's visit to Istanbul.

=== The third bridge ===
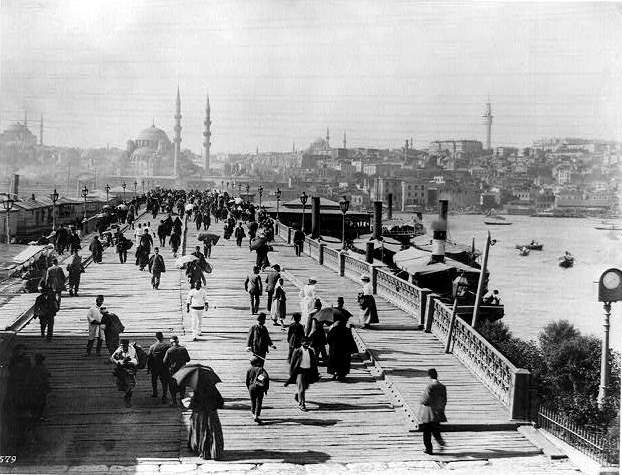
Between 1880-1893, the Galata Bridge and in the background the New Mosque, Istanbul

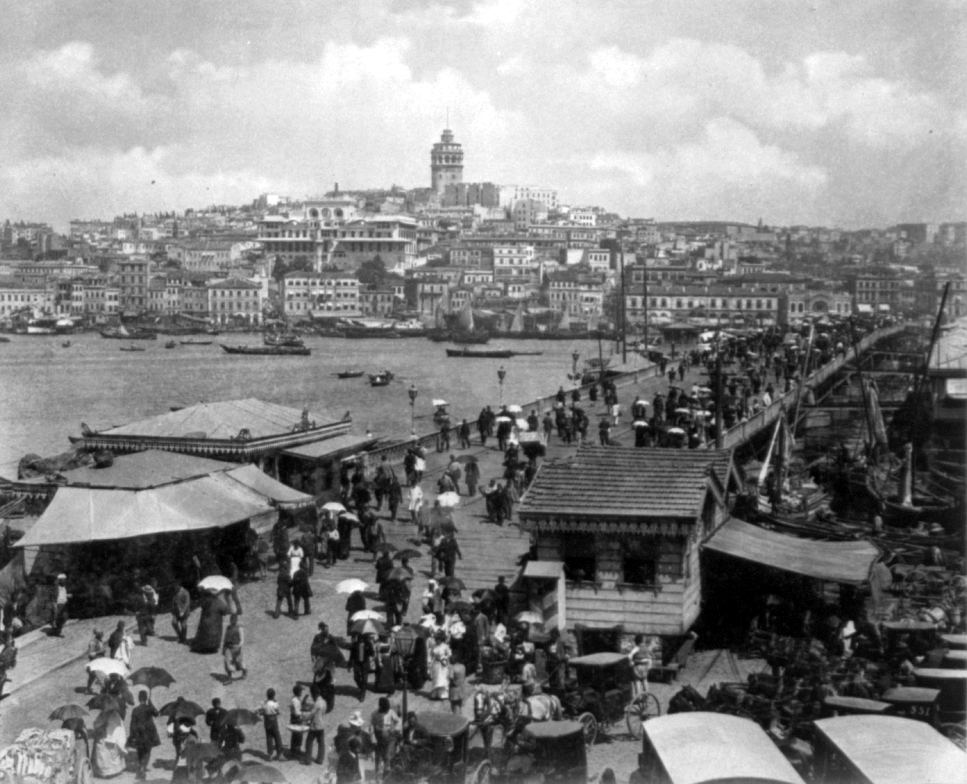
The third Galata Bridge, ca. 1892–1893

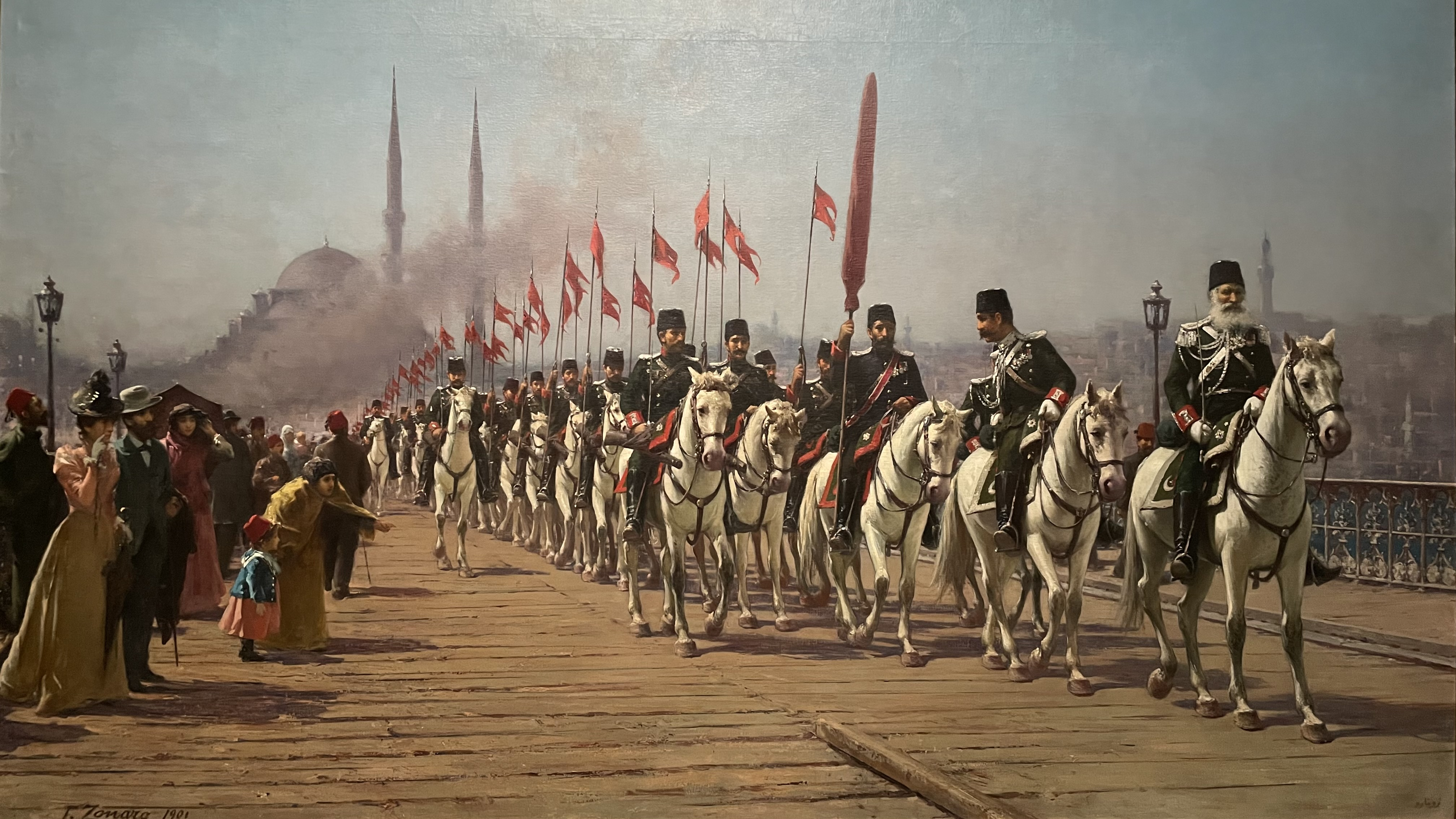
The "Ertuğrul" cavalry regiment on the third Galata Bridge – painting by Fausto Zonaro for Sultan Abdul Hamid II

In 1870, a contract was signed with a French company, Forges et Chantiers de la Mediteranée for construction of a third bridge, but the outbreak of war between France and Germany delayed the project, which was given instead to the British firm G. Wells in 1872. This bridge, completed in 1875, was 480 m (1,570 ft) long and 14 m (46 ft) wide and rested on 24 pontoons. It was built at a cost of 105,000 gold liras and was used until 1912 when it was towed upstream to replace the old Cisr-i Atik Bridge.

=== The fourth bridge ===
The fourth Galata Bridge (in Turkish usually known as Eski Köprü; lit. "the old bridge") was built in 1912 by the German firm Hüttenwerk Oberhausen AG for 350,000 gold lira. This floating bridge was 466 m (1,529 ft) long and 25 m (82 ft) wide. The bridge was made of 12 individual pieces; 2 terrestrial pieces 17 meters in length, 9 pieces around 40 meters in length, and a central piece 66.7 meters in length, which made the bridge moveable. It was a tolled bridge until 1930.

The fourth bridge contained bars and restaurants on its underside. It is usually described as an important place for the development of modern Turkish rock music, due to it housing the influential bar Kemancı. Modern Turkish rock bands and singers such as Duman, MFÖ, Şebnem Ferah and Teoman have spent their formative years in Kemancı. Trolleybuses of the Istanbul trolleybus system used the bridge from 1962 to 1984.

In 1992 it was badly damaged in a fire and after one week towed up from its original location. At the time of the fire, the fifth and current bridge was already under construction near the fourth one, which was planned to be decommissioned in the near future. During the towing process one damaged section of the bridge collapsed. The bridge was classified as a cultural heritage of the second degree by the Turkish authorities.

3 pieces of the bridge went missing after the towing. After repairs the remaining parts of the old bridge were repurposed between Ayvansaray-Hasköy in 2002. From July to October 2012 the bridge was opened for motor vehicles to ease the traffic flow on the Haliç Bridge, which was under renovation. Due to the fact that the bridge was not allowing ferries to pass, disrupting the water circulation and preventing the ongoing cleaning efforts at the Golden Horn the bridge's middle section was towed near the shoreline in 2012. After the second towing the former shops and restaurants were squatted by the homeless and the bridge was left in disrepair. In 2016 the majority of the bridge was transported to Haliç and Tuzla shipyards. The remaining 50 meter section on the Hasköy/Balat coast was left in disrepair.

=== The fifth (current) bridge ===
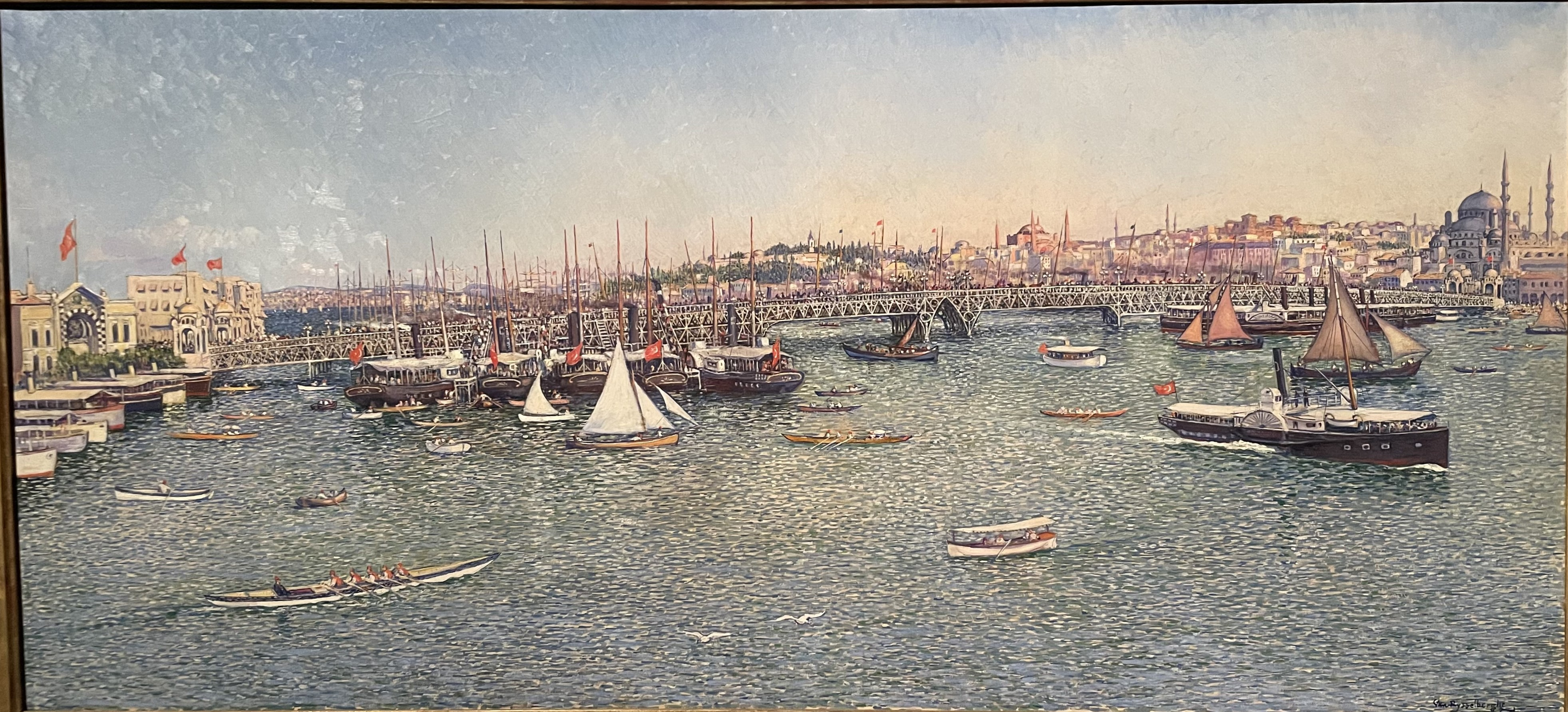
Galata bridge during the late Ottoman era

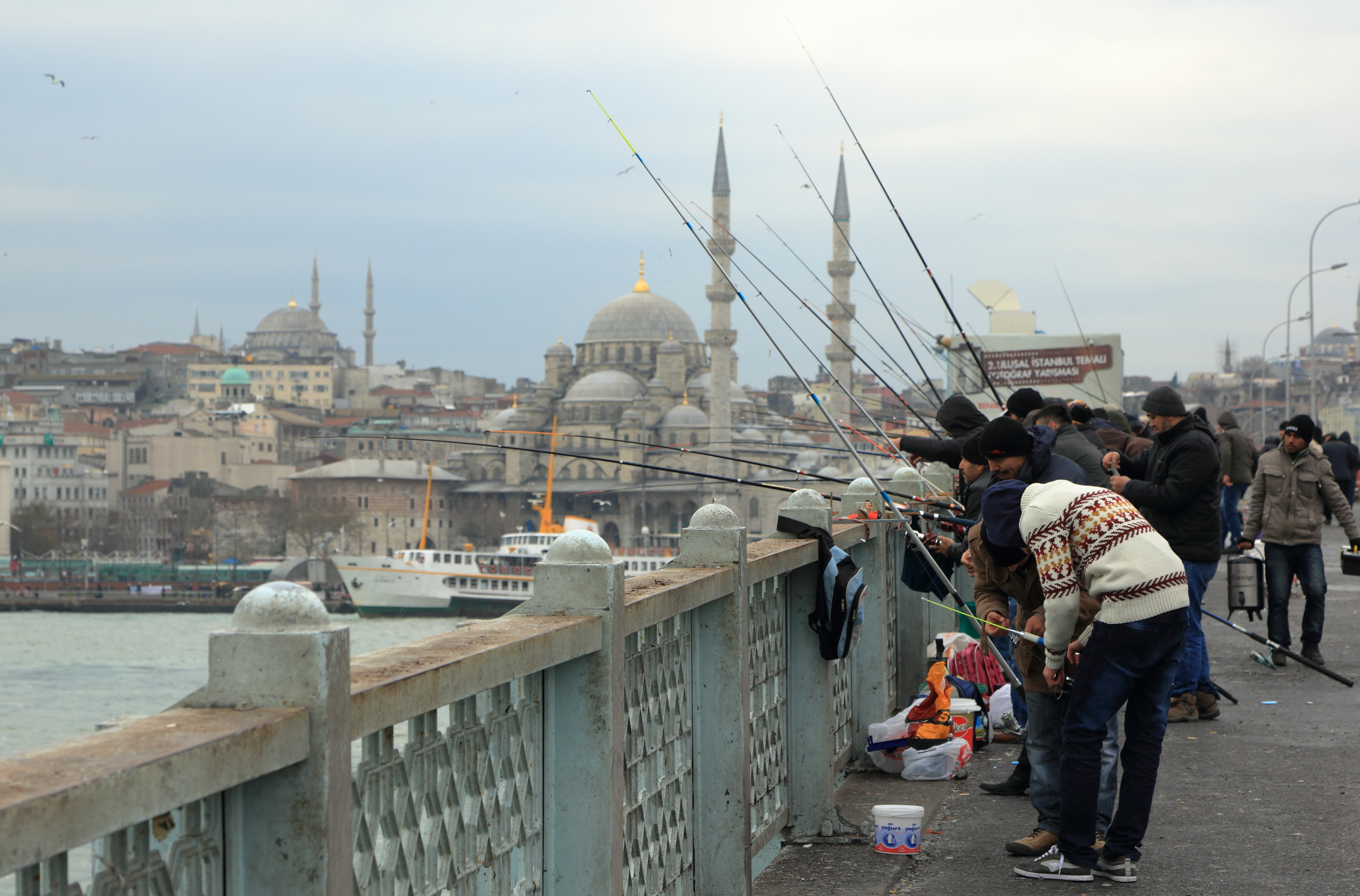
Fishermen on the bridge. The New Mosque is in the background.

The fifth Galata bridge was built by the Turkish construction company STFA just a few meters away from the previous bridge, between Karaköy and Eminönü, and completed in December 1994. It was designed and supervised by GAMB (Göncer Ayalp Engineering Company). It is a bascule bridge, which is 490 m (1,610 ft) long with a main span of 80 m (260 ft). The deck of the bridge is 42 m (138 ft) wide and has two vehicular lanes and one walkway in each direction. Tram tracks running down the middle of it allow the T1 tram to run from Bağcılar, in the western suburbs to Kabataş, a few blocks away from Dolmabahçe Palace.

In 2003 a string of restaurants were added to the underside of the bridge in imitation of the more ramshackle ones that had clung to the underside of the fourth bridge.

== Culture ==
The Galata Bridge has long acted as a symbolic link between the old city of Istanbul, site of the imperial palace and principal religious and secular institutions of the Ottoman Empire, and the modern districts of Beyoğlu, where a large proportion of the inhabitants used to be non-Muslims and where foreign merchants and diplomats lived and worked. As Peyami Safa wrote in his novel, Fatih-Harbiye, a person who went from Fatih to Harbiye via the bridge passed into a different civilisation and culture.

The bridge crops up in most late 19th-century accounts of Constantinople, perhaps most vividly in Edmondo De Amicis's Constantinople in which he describes the colourful array of characters from many races to be seen on it. The bridge also appears in Virginia Woolf's novel Orlando although it did not exist in the 16th century as the book suggests.

It is sometimes suggested that the card game bridge acquired its name because the British soldiers who invented it used to cross the Galata Bridge on their way to favourite coffeehouses.

== In popular culture ==
Geert Mak's short book, The Bridge, published in 2008, is entirely devoted to the bridge and the many people who make a living in and around it. Apart from its place in fiction, the Galata Bridge's romantic appearance has made it the subject of many paintings and engravings.

The opening chapter of British author Ben Elton's time-travelling novel Time and Time Again takes place on the Galata Bridge.

Duman's first album Eski Köprünün Altında (lit. 'Under the old bridge') and the album's first song Köprüaltı (lit. 'Underside of the bridge') mention the fourth bridge.

The Istanbul Tales film of 2005 features the bridge in the last 10 minutes. Also showing the sections.

== See also ==
- Atatürk Bridge
- Haliç Bridge
- Golden Horn Metro Bridge
- Golden Horn
- Galata Tower
