= Golden Horn Metro Bridge =

Rapid transit bridge in western Istanbul

Golden Horn Metro Bridge Haliç Metro Köprüsü
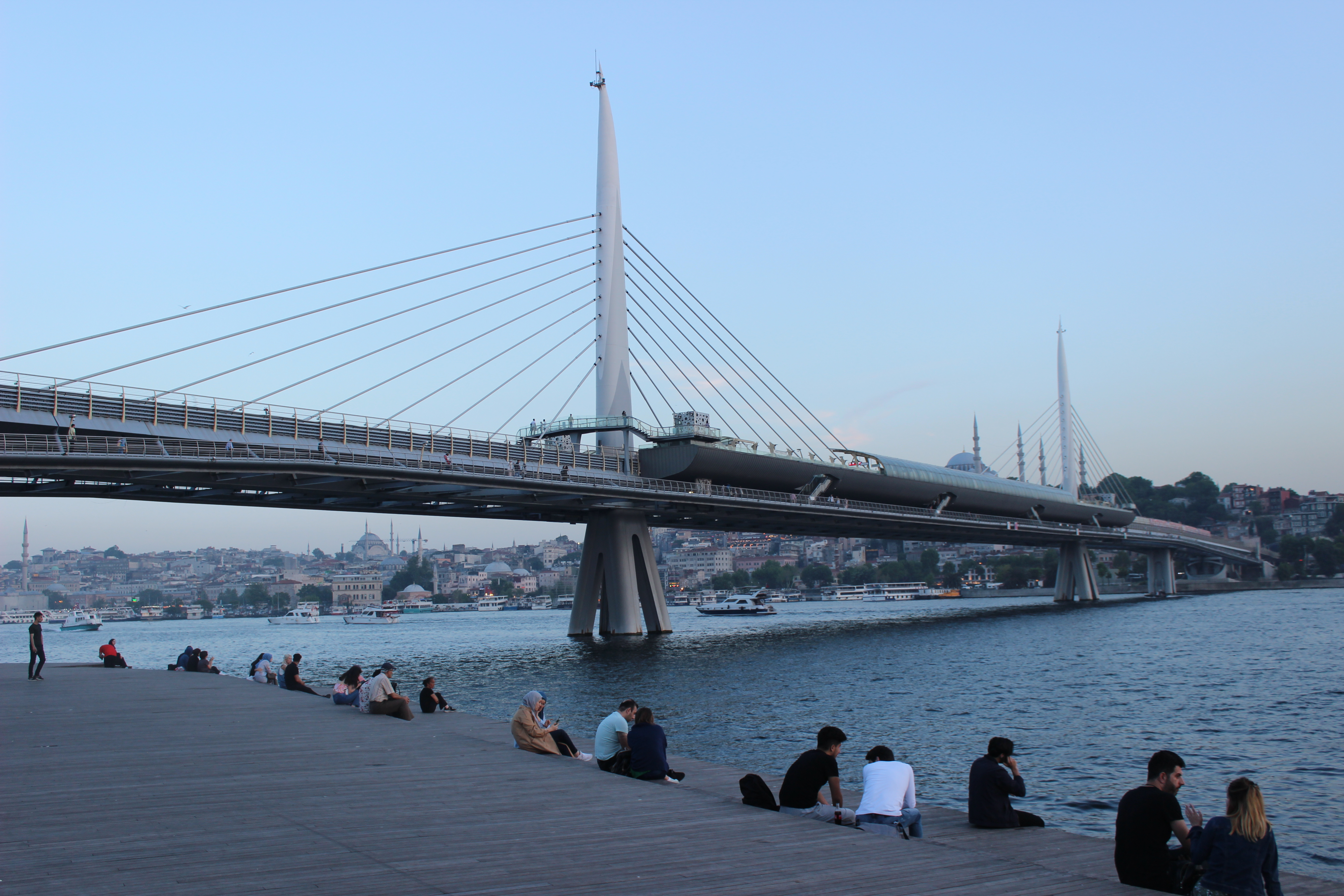
- A view of the Golden Horn Metro Bridge, with the Süleymaniye Mosque in the background.
- Coordinates: 41.0227°N 28.9662°E
- Crosses: Golden Horn
- Locale: Istanbul
- Other name: Haliç Metro Crossing Bridge
- Maintained by: Gülermak JSC; Astaldi

Characteristics
- Design: Cable-stayed bridge
- Material: Steel
- Total length: 936 m (3,071 ft)
- Width: 12.6 m (41 ft)
- Height: 65 m (213 ft)
- Longest span: 180 m (590 ft)
- Clearance above: 13 m (43 ft)

History
- Designer: Hakan Kıran; Michel Virlogeux; T Engineering
- Construction start: January 2, 2009
- Construction cost: €146.7 million
- Opened: February 15, 2014

Location
- Interactive map of Golden Horn Metro Bridge

The Golden Horn Metro Bridge (Turkish: Haliç Metro Köprüsü) is a cable-stayed bridge carrying the M2 line of the Istanbul Metro across the Golden Horn in Istanbul, Turkey. It connects Karaköy and Küçükpazarı on the European side of Istanbul, and is located between the Galata Bridge and Atatürk Bridge, approximately 200 m (660 ft) east of the latter. It is the fourth bridge across the Golden Horn and entered service on February 15, 2014.

The bridge enables a direct connection between Hacıosman metro station in the Sarıyer district (at the northern end of the M2 line), and the Yenikapı transport hub in the Fatih district (at the southern end of the M2 line.)

== Project ==
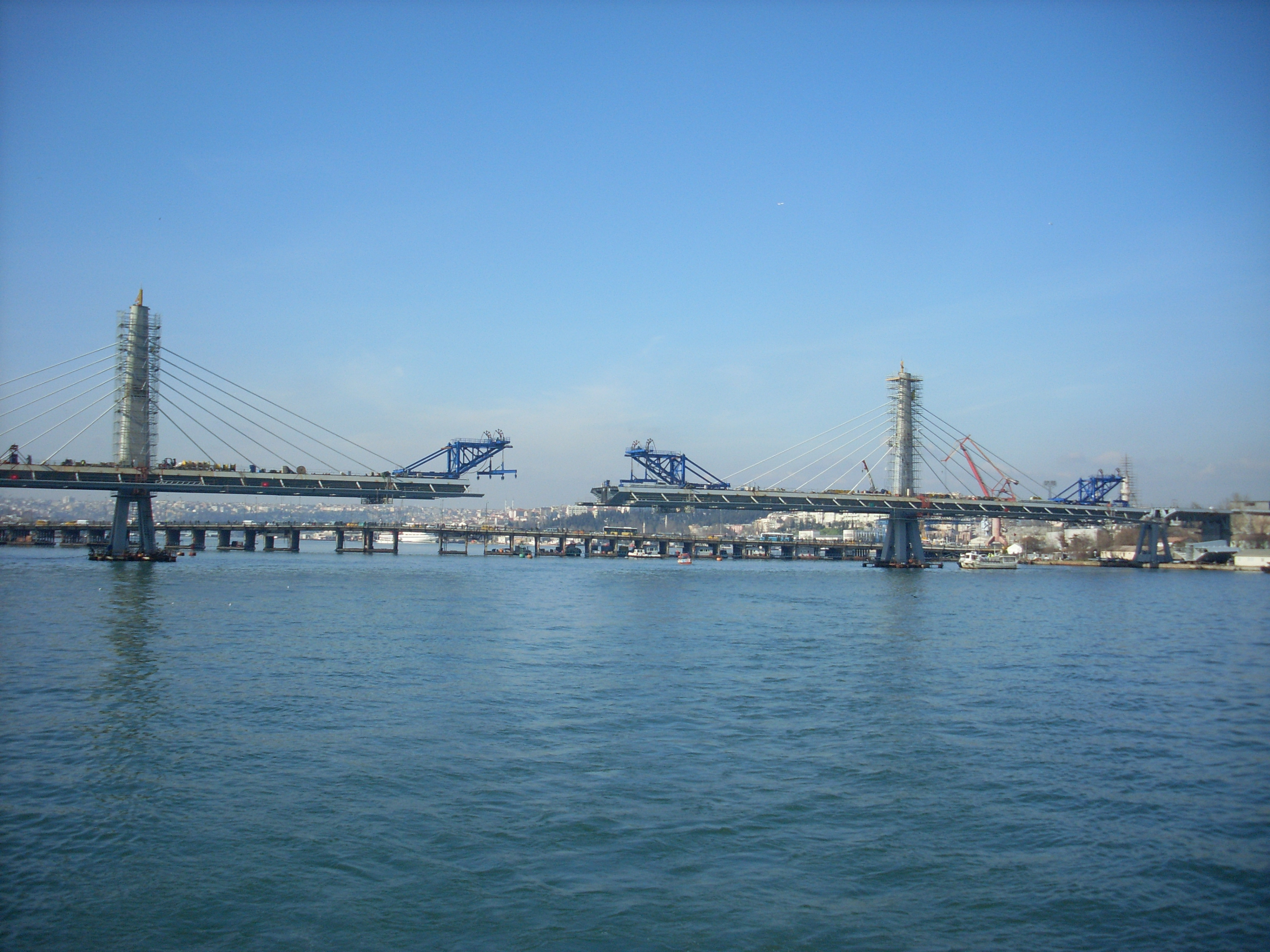
Golden Horn Metro Bridge under construction in February 2013, with the Atatürk Bridge in the background.

The idea of the bridge was first mooted in 1952 but only really came to life during the period when Kadir Topbaş was mayor of Istanbul (2004-17).

After the new metro line was approved by the city's Monument Protection Board and the tunnels relating to it had been completed, the Metropolitan Municipality put out a tender for the construction of the bridge. By 2005, a total of 21 proposals had been submitted to the Monument Protection Board, but none was found to be sufficiently in harmony with the city's skyline. Even the successful design, by architect Hakan Kıran, was considered controversial.

In November 2009, the proposed height of the towers was reduced from a projected 82 m (269 ft) to 65 m (213 ft) after UNESCO threatened to remove Istanbul from its list of World Heritage sites. The top level of cables was also reduced from 63 to 55 m (207 to 180 ft), and then lowered even further to 47 m (154 ft) in 2011. This revised design was approved in February 2012.

The bridge's conceptual design was carried out by French engineer and bridge specialist Michel Virlogeux, who also designed the Yavuz Sultan Selim Bridge (Third Bosphorus Bridge) across the Bosphorus strait. Turkish architect Hakan Kıran was responsible for the architectural design and served as the construction supervision. Wiecon Consulting Engineers & Architects carried out the structural engineering work for the bridge. It was built by a partnership between the Italian firm Astaldi and the Turkish Gülermak Ağır Sanayi İnşaat ve Taahhüt A.Ş.

Construction began on January 2, 2009, and was initially meant to be completed within 600 days. Eventually it was finished on January 9, 2013. Test runs for the new metro began the next day, and the bridge went into service on 15 February 2014. The cost of the construction was €146.7 million.

Because of the historic character of the bridge's surroundings, the project underwent several revisions. For example, the discovery of a Byzantine-era vault on the Unkapanı/Küçükpazarı side of the bridge during excavation works for the pier foundations necessitated a redesign of the project. The design of the swing bridge operator's command building also had to be revised when the wall of a Byzantine-era basilica and a graveyard on the same bank came to light.

The eventual design pays homage to the city's maritime heritage with support towers shaped to look like horns and hull-shaped supports for the platforms.

== Architecture ==
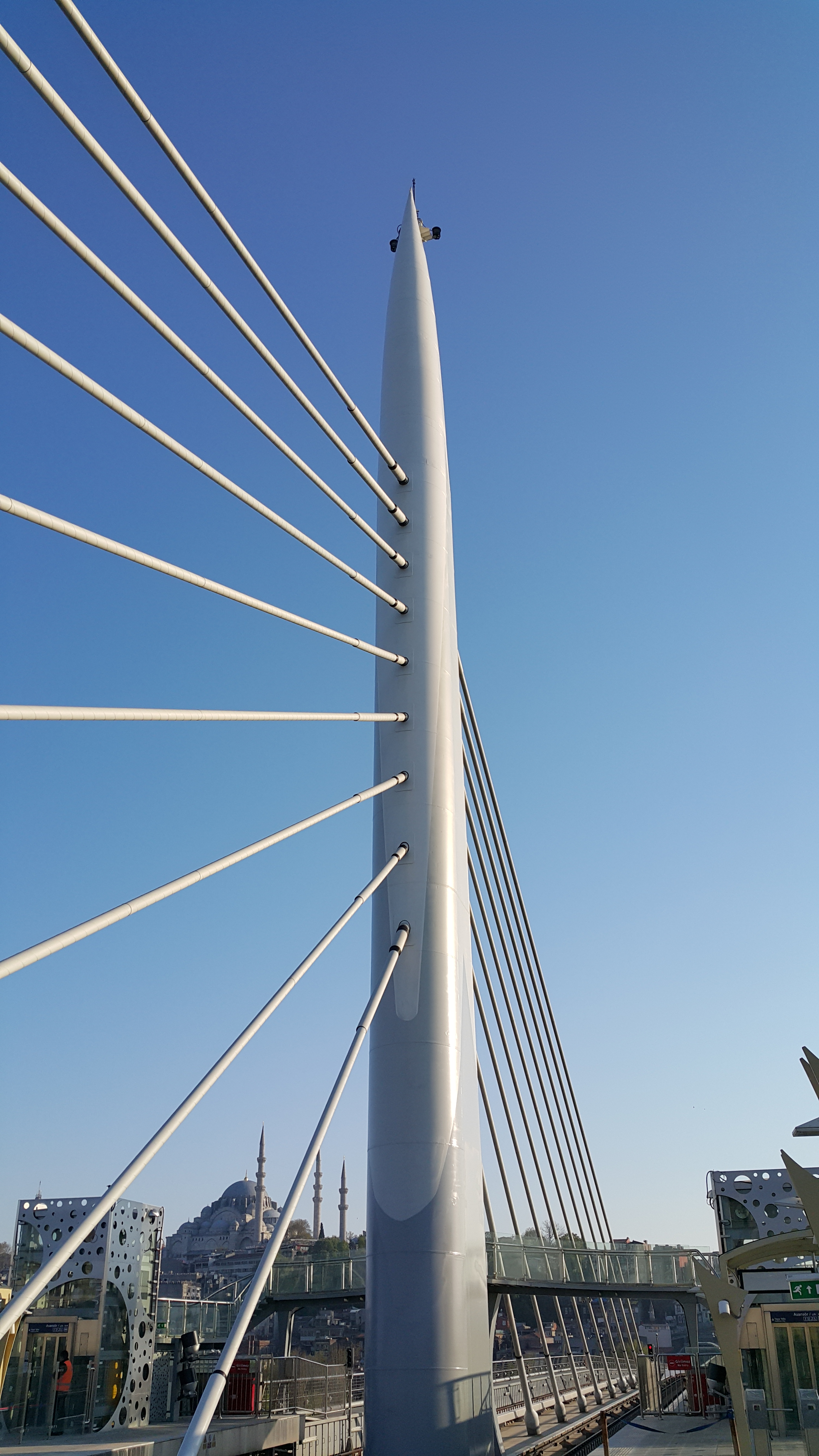
The south tower of bridge with the Süleymaniye Mosque in the background

The cable-stayed bridge has an overall length of 936 m (3,071 ft) between Azapkapı (Beyoğlu) and Unkapanı/Küçükpazarı (Fatih), and a span of 460 m (1,510 ft) over water. The longest span between the two towers is 180 m (590 ft). It is flanked by viaducts on both sides which connect the bridge with the metro tunnels on each side of the Golden Horn. Nine cables are connected to each side of the two towers in harp-design starting at a height of 47 m (154 ft). To reinforce the soft bedrock, dozens of steel pipe piles with diameters of 1,800 mm (71 in) and 2,500 mm (98 in), supplied from Europe, were driven more than 30 m (98 ft) deep into the ground using a hydraulic hammer. The two steel supporting towers are 65 m (213 ft) high, Each rests on a nine-pile group while for the side supports four- or five-pile groups were built.

The 12.6-metre-wide (41 ft) bridge carries two railway tracks between two 4.4-metre-wide (14 ft) sidewalks at a height of 13 m (43 ft) above sea level. The deck is a 4.45-metre-high (14.6 ft) box girder.

On the Unkapanı/Küçükpazarı side, a 120-metre-long (390 ft) swing bridge - essentially a cantilever structure - permits passage for large ships. It has 50-metre (160 ft) and 70-metre-long (230 ft) spans, which rest on a central pier. Controlled from a room on a platform between the bridge and the shoreline, the swing bridge turns at a right angle about the vertical axis after lifting, and provides about 40-metre-wide (130 ft) free clearance within four to six minutes. The swing bridge is intended to be open once a week between the hours of 1:00 and 5:00 in the summer time, and twice a week during these hours in the winter months.

A station with a 180-metre-long (590 ft) platform, suitable for holding an 8-car train, is situated in the middle of the bridge. It extends across the full length of the main span, and is capped with a 90-metre-long (300 ft) canopy. The metro line over the bridge is expected to transport around one million passengers daily.

== Controversy ==
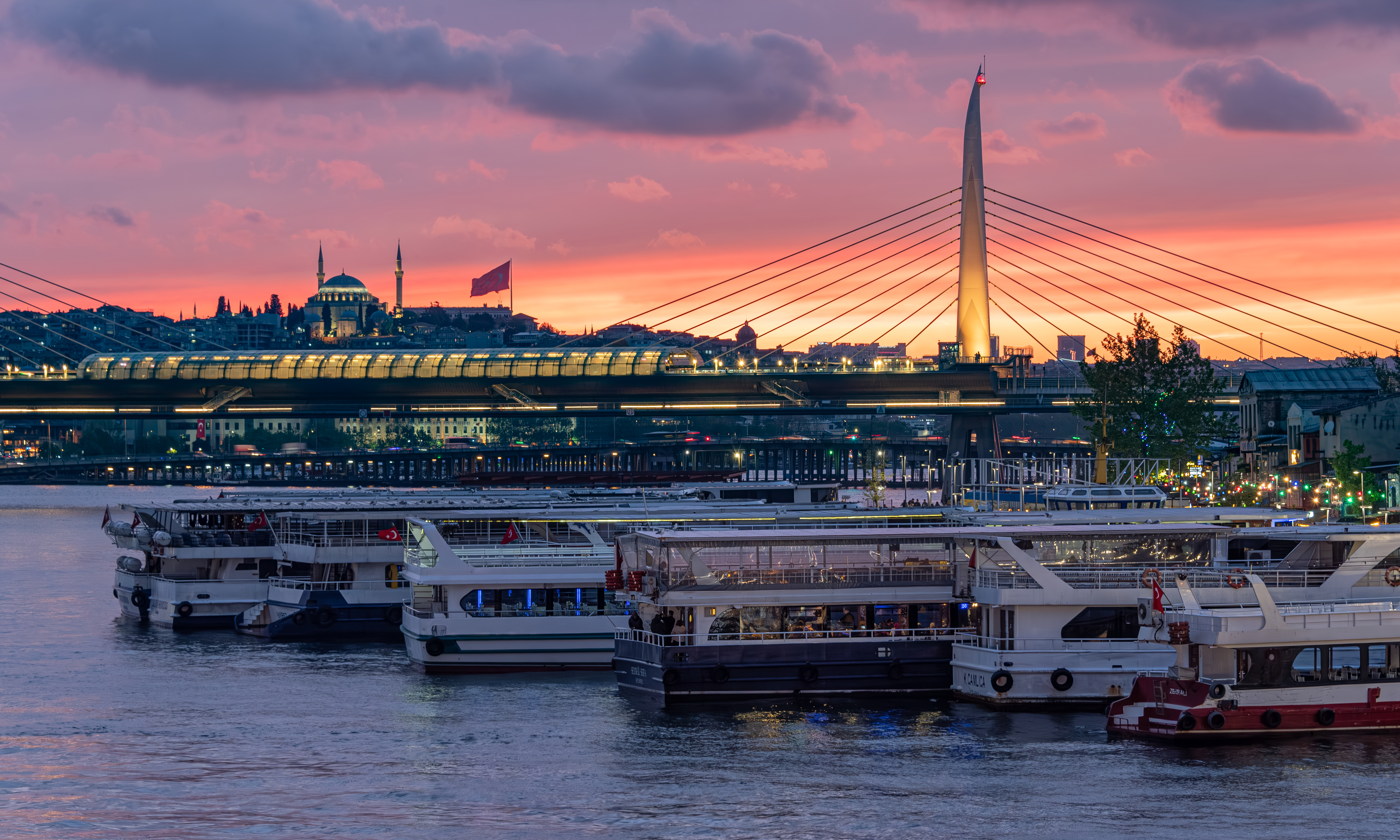
Golden Horn Metro Bridge at sunset, Yavuz Selim Mosque can be seen in the background, 2025

The design of the Golden Horn Metro Bridge was initially controversial. Chambers of architects and city planners, as well as many citizens, complained that the plans originally approved by UNESCO had been changed without permission. The design was also said to damage the city's historic skyline. However, now that the Metro is open fewer complaints are heard, and the Haliç station and walkways have eased communication between the areas on either side of the bridge for non-car owners.

== See also ==
- Galata Bridge
- Atatürk Bridge
- Haliç Bridge
