= Gülermak =

Turkish construction company

Gülermak Ağır Sanayi İnşaat ve Taahhüt A Ş.
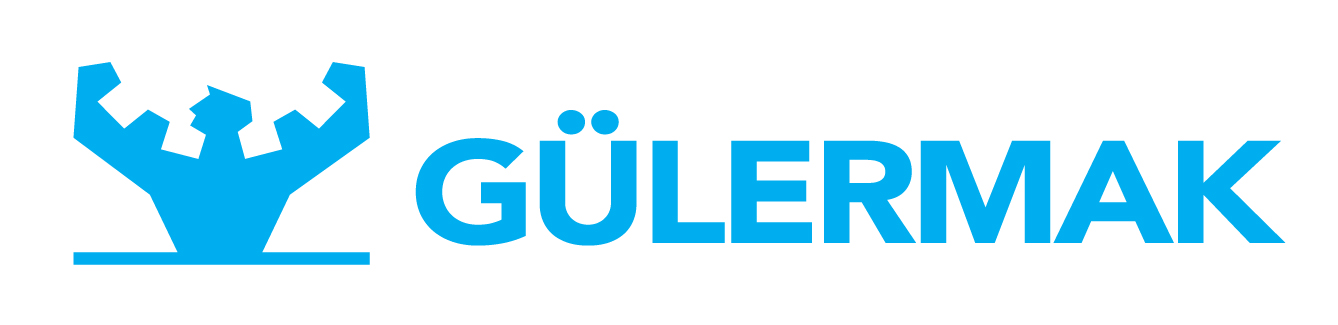
- Industry: Construction
- Founded: 1958; 68 years ago in Turkey
- Headquarters: Ankara, Turkey
- Area served: International
- Products: Transport
- Revenue: ▲$1 billion (2024)
- Operating income: ▲$105 million (2024)
- Net income: ▲$102 million (2024)
- Total assets: ▲$1.18 billion (2024)
- Total equity: ▲$233 million (2024)
- Number of employees: 2,707 (2024)
- Website: gulermak.com.tr

Gülermak Ağır Sanayi İnşaat ve Taahhüt A Ş. (Gülermak in short form; English: "Gülermak Heavy Industry Construction and Contracting") is a Turkish construction company, especially for rail transport, established in 1958.

== Overview ==
Gülermak has constructed more than 260 km (160 mi) of underground tunnels and 120 metro stations. According to Engineering News-Record (ENR), in 2020 the company was ranked as the 124th international contractor in the world with revenues of $699.1 million. The company maintains offices in Ankara, Turkey; Warsaw, Poland; Dubai, United Arab Emirates; Stockholm, Sweden; and Mumbai, India.

Gülermak undertakes international construction projects, primarily in the rail transport sector, with operations in India, Norway, Poland, Turkey, and the United Arab Emirates. Notable projects involving the company include:

- Expressway S2 (Poland)
- Golden Horn Metro Bridge
- Istanbul Metro (including the M4 line)
- Pune Metro
- Route 2020 (Dubai Metro)
- Kanpur Metro
- Świnoujście Tunnel

Gülermak is part of the ExpoLink Consortium, established in 2016, comprising Alstom, Acciona, and Gülermak, that is constructing the Route 2020 metro line, part of the Dubai Metro, linking Expo 2020 to the Red Line. In 2020, Gülermak was awarded a Kraków tram line contract in Poland. Examples of projects include metro stations and infrastructure in India, a metro line branch in Dubai, the underground in Warsaw. Gülermak has its own assembly lines.

The company's projects, especially tunnelling using tunnel boring machines (TBMs), have been discussed in peer-reviewed papers. Record-breaking results involving the company have been reported on the Dudullu-Bostancı Metro Line in Istanbul.

In October 2022, Gülermak entered the infrastructure market in the Philippines as part of a joint venture with Lotte Engineering & Construction and EEI Corporation to support the development of the North–South Commuter Railway (NSCR). The consortium was selected by the Philippine Department of Transportation to oversee the civil engineering and construction of a 22-hectare railway depot located in Calamba, Laguna. As a critical component of the wider 147-kilometer regional rail network financed by the Asian Development Bank, the project is designed to modernize transportation between Metro Manila and neighboring provinces, significantly reducing travel times across the island of Luzon.

In 2023 Gülermak entered into an eight-year joint venture with Alstom (French manufacturer) and Arcada (a Romanian construction company) . The consortium of organisations won their bid for the 1.82 billion Euro contract to design and construct the first metro line in Cluj-Napoca, Romania.

== Controversy ==
In 2017, it was reported that the company experienced delays in the software for the signalling system of the Ankara-Konya High-Speed Train. In early 2021, there were reported issues with salary payments for the company's workers during the construction of the Sabiha Gökçen Airport metro.

== See also ==
- List of companies of Turkey
