= Spice Bazaar =

Covered Market in Istanbul, Turkey

- Mısır Çarşısı
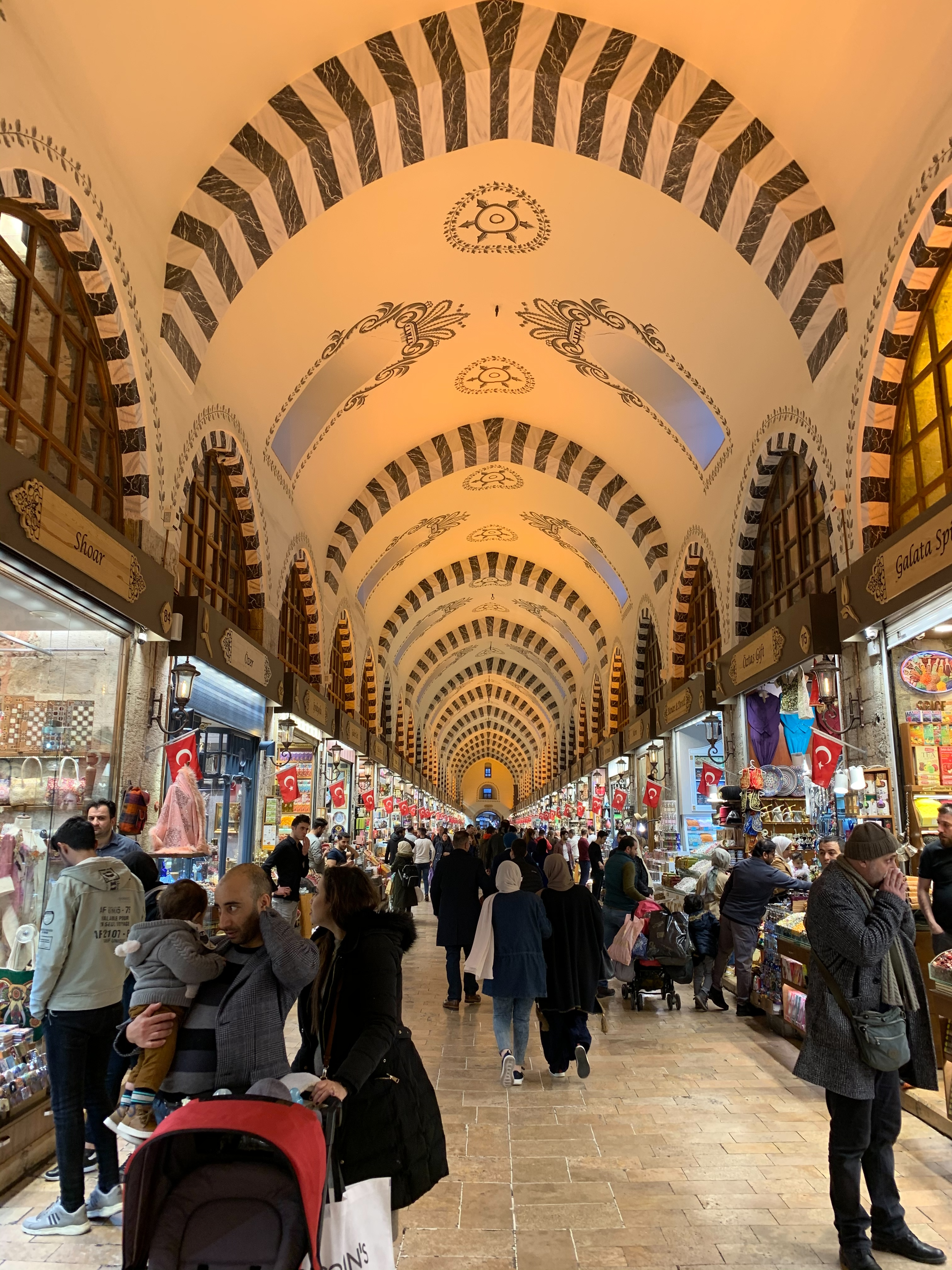
- Inside the Spice Bazaar in Istanbul
- Interactive map of Spice Bazaar
- Location: Istanbul Turkey
- Coordinates: 41°00′59″N 28°58′14″E
- Type: Covered Bazaar
- Beginning date: 1660; 366 years ago
- Completion date: After 1660

The Spice Bazaar (Turkish: Mısır Çarşısı, meaning "Egyptian Bazaar") in Istanbul, Turkey, is one of the largest bazaars in the city. Located in the Eminönü quarter of the Fatih district, it is the most famous covered shopping complex after the Grand Bazaar.

== History ==
There are several documents suggesting that the name of the bazaar was first "New Bazaar". Then it got its name "Egyptian Bazaar" (Turkish: Mısır Çarşısı) because it was built with the revenues from the Ottoman eyalet of Egypt in 1660. The word mısır has a double meaning in Turkish: "Egypt" and "maize". This is why sometimes the name is wrongly translated as "Corn Bazaar". The bazaar was (and still is) the center for spice trade in Istanbul, but in recent years shops of other types are gradually replacing the sellers of spices.

The building itself is part of the külliye (complex) of the New Mosque. The revenues obtained from the rented shops inside the bazaar building were used for the upkeeping of the mosque.

The structure was designed by the court architect Koca Kasım Ağa, but the construction works began under the supervision of another court architect, Mustafa Ağa, in the last months of 1660; following Istanbul's Great Fire of 1660 that began on 24 July 1660 and, lasting for slightly more than two days (circa 49 hours, according to the chronicles of Abdi Pasha), destroyed many neighbourhoods in the city. A major rebuilding and redevelopment effort started in the city following the fire, which included the resumption of the New Mosque's construction works in 1660 (halted between 1603 and 1660, the construction of the mosque was ultimately completed between 1660 and 1665) and the beginning of the Spice Bazaar's construction in the same year (all buildings in the New Mosque külliye, including the Spice Bazaar, were commissioned by Sultana Turhan Hatice, the Valide Sultan (Queen Mother) of Sultan Mehmed IV.)

== Egyptian Bazaar today ==
Spice Bazaar has a total of 85 shops selling spices, Turkish delight and other sweets, jewellery, souvenirs, and dried fruits and nuts.

== Gallery ==
Interior

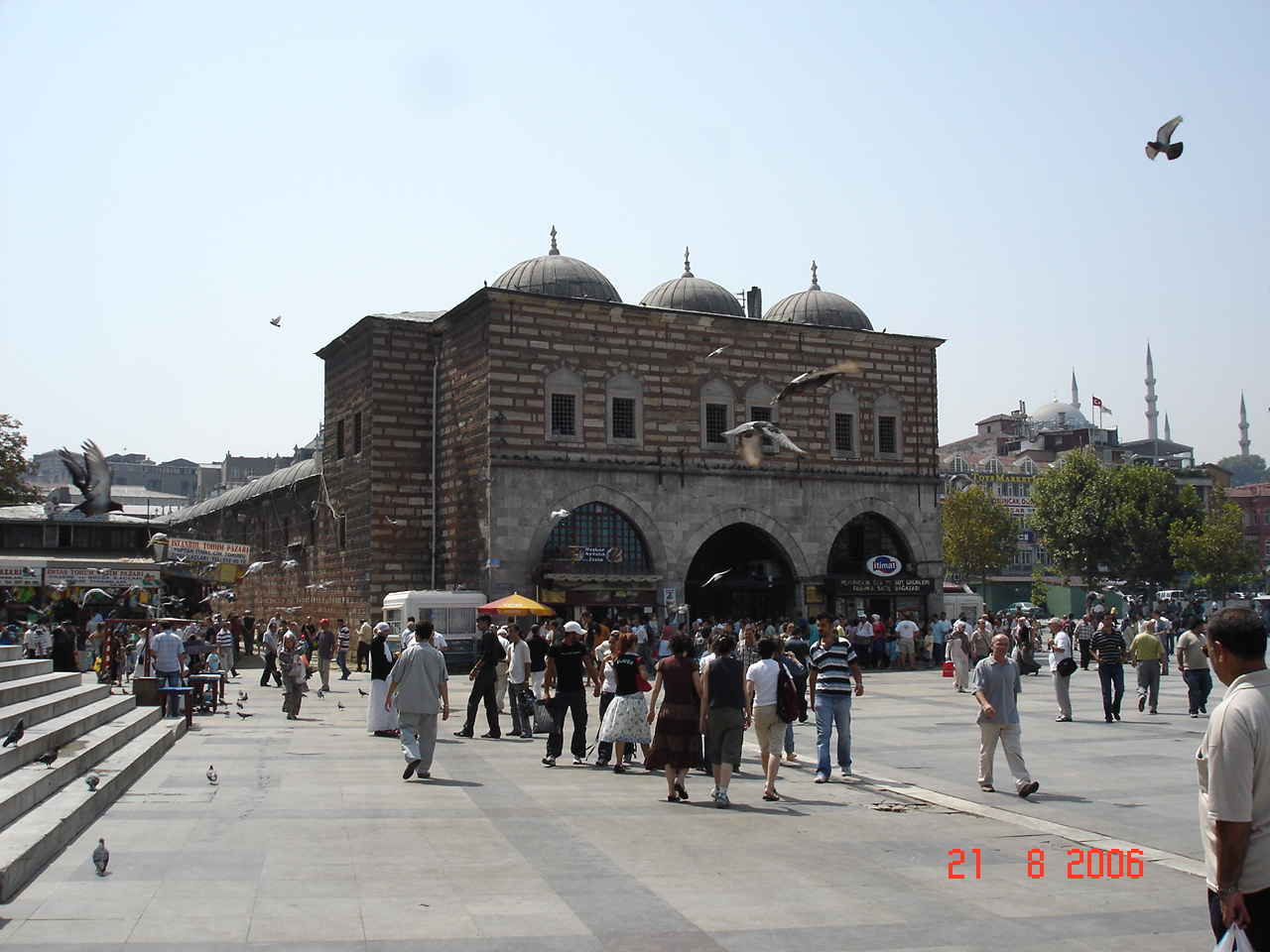
Spice Bazaar building

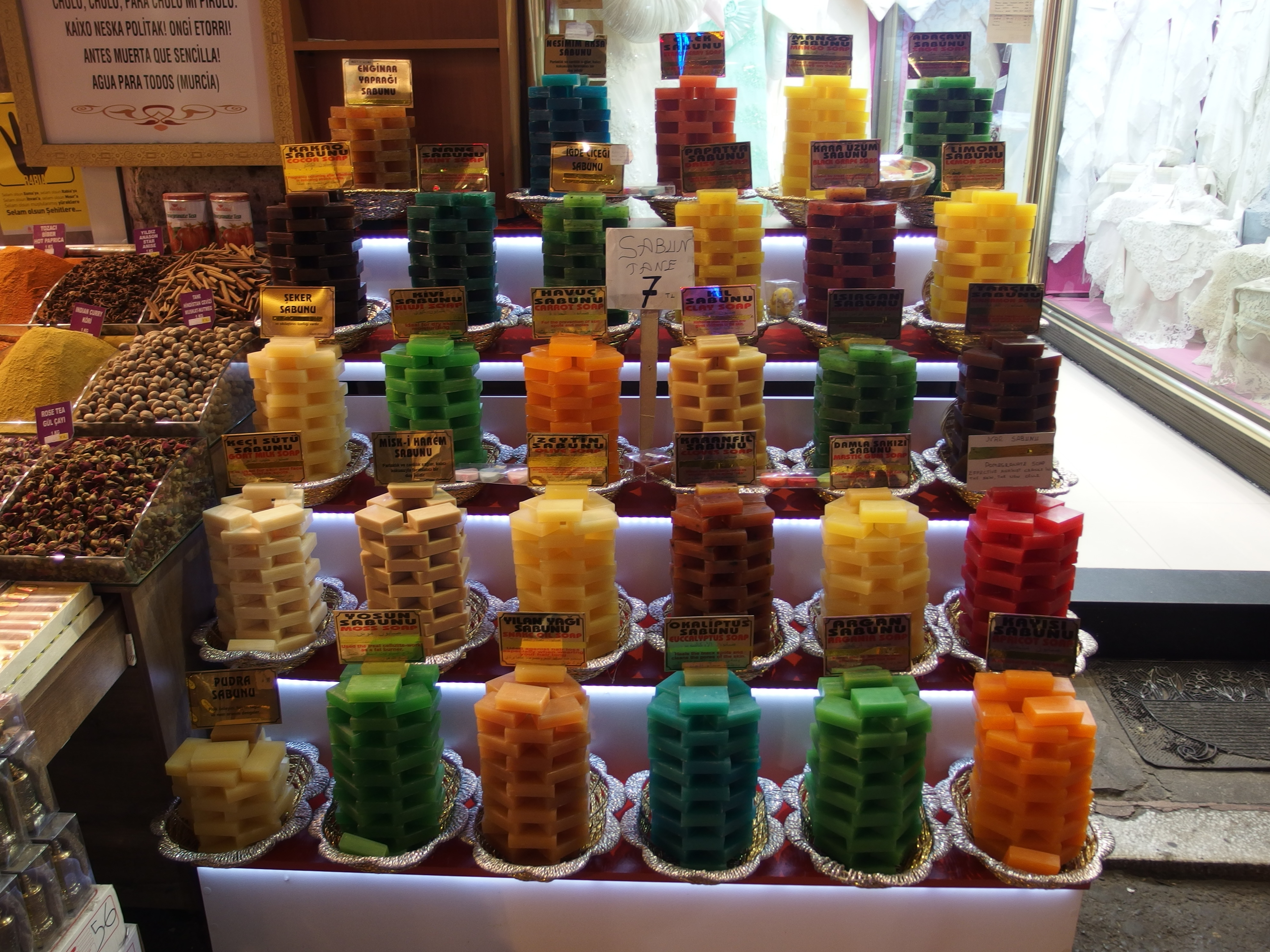
Products of the Spice Bazaar

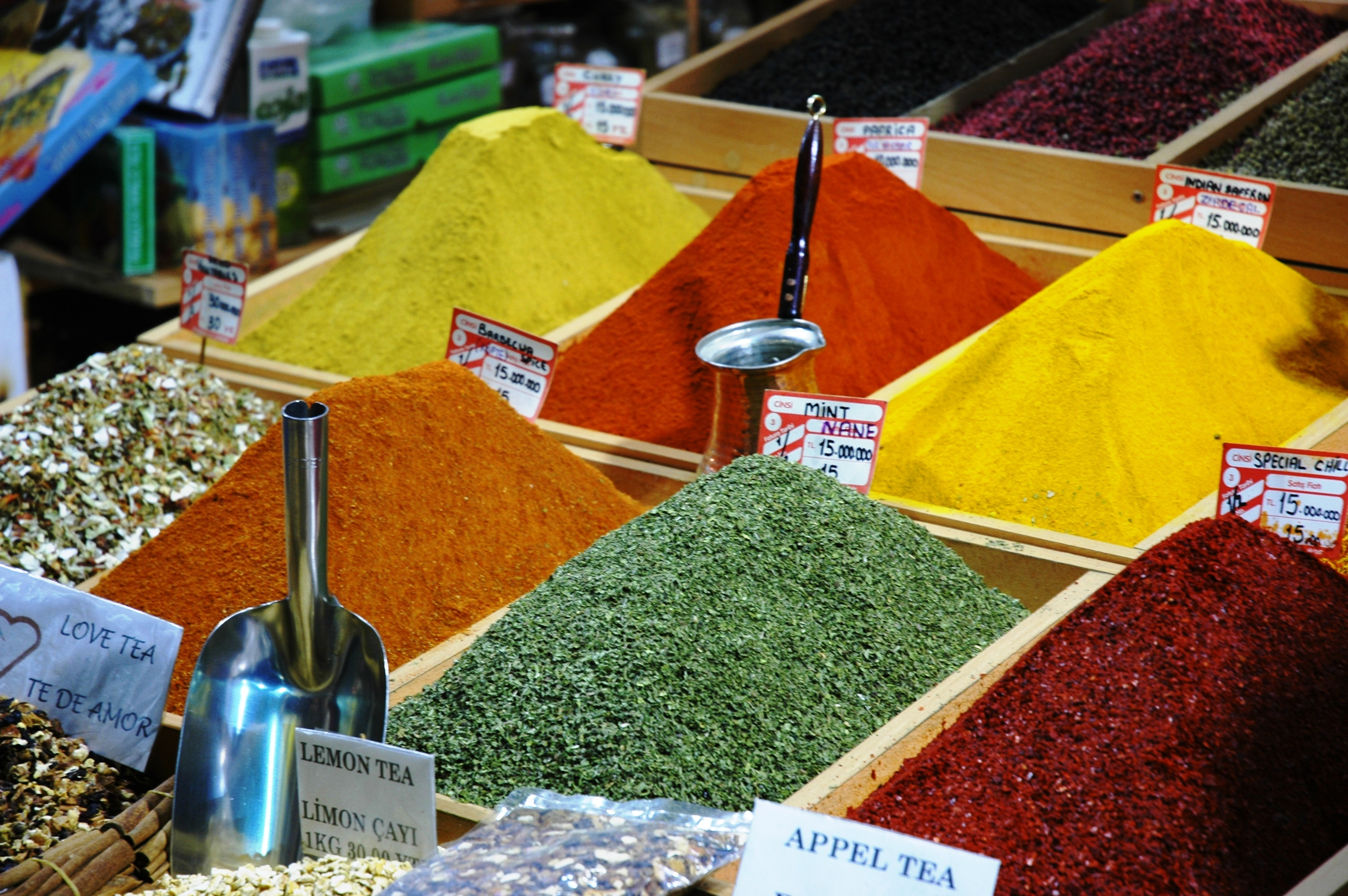
Products of the Spice Bazaar

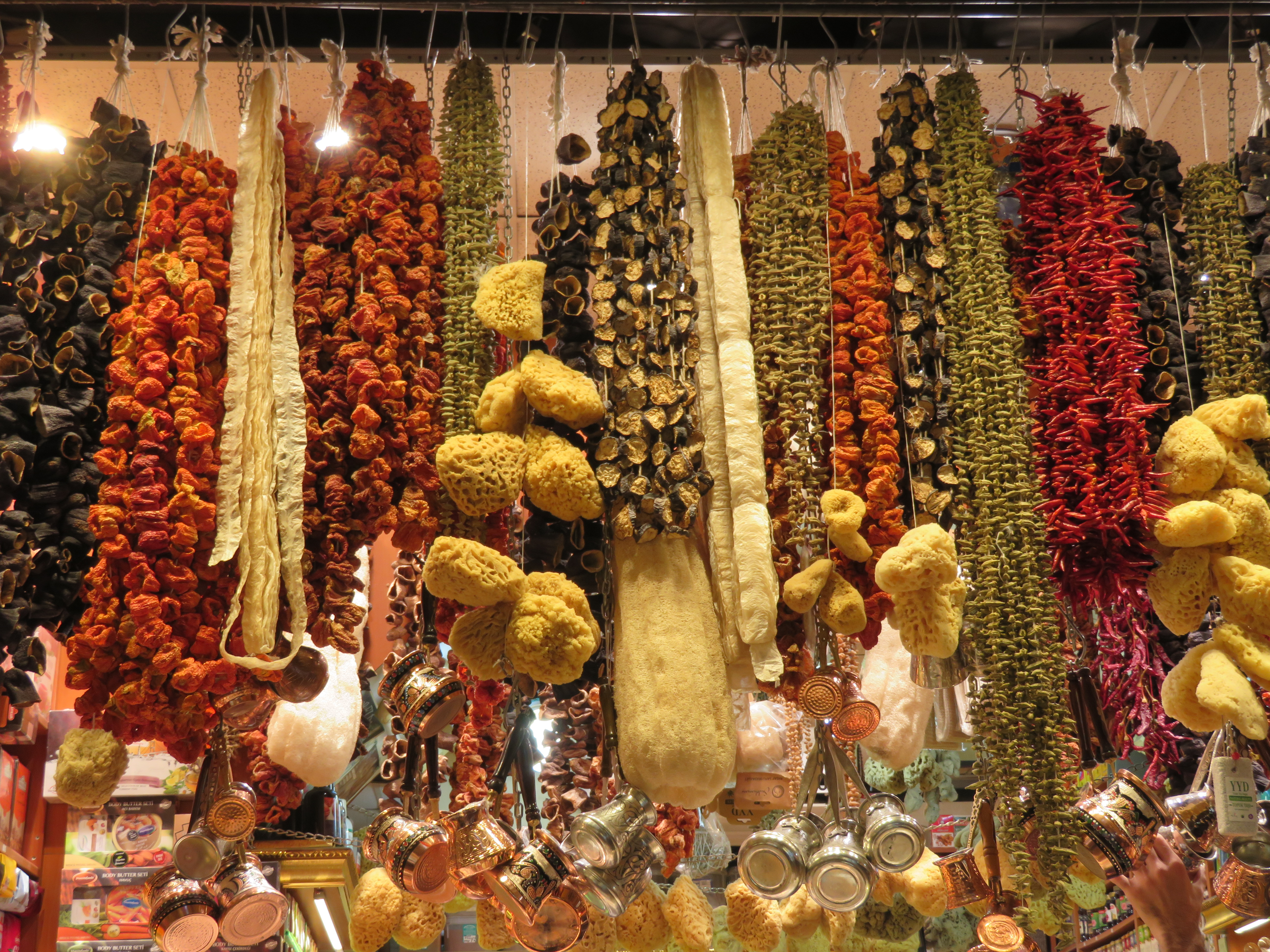
Dried chillies

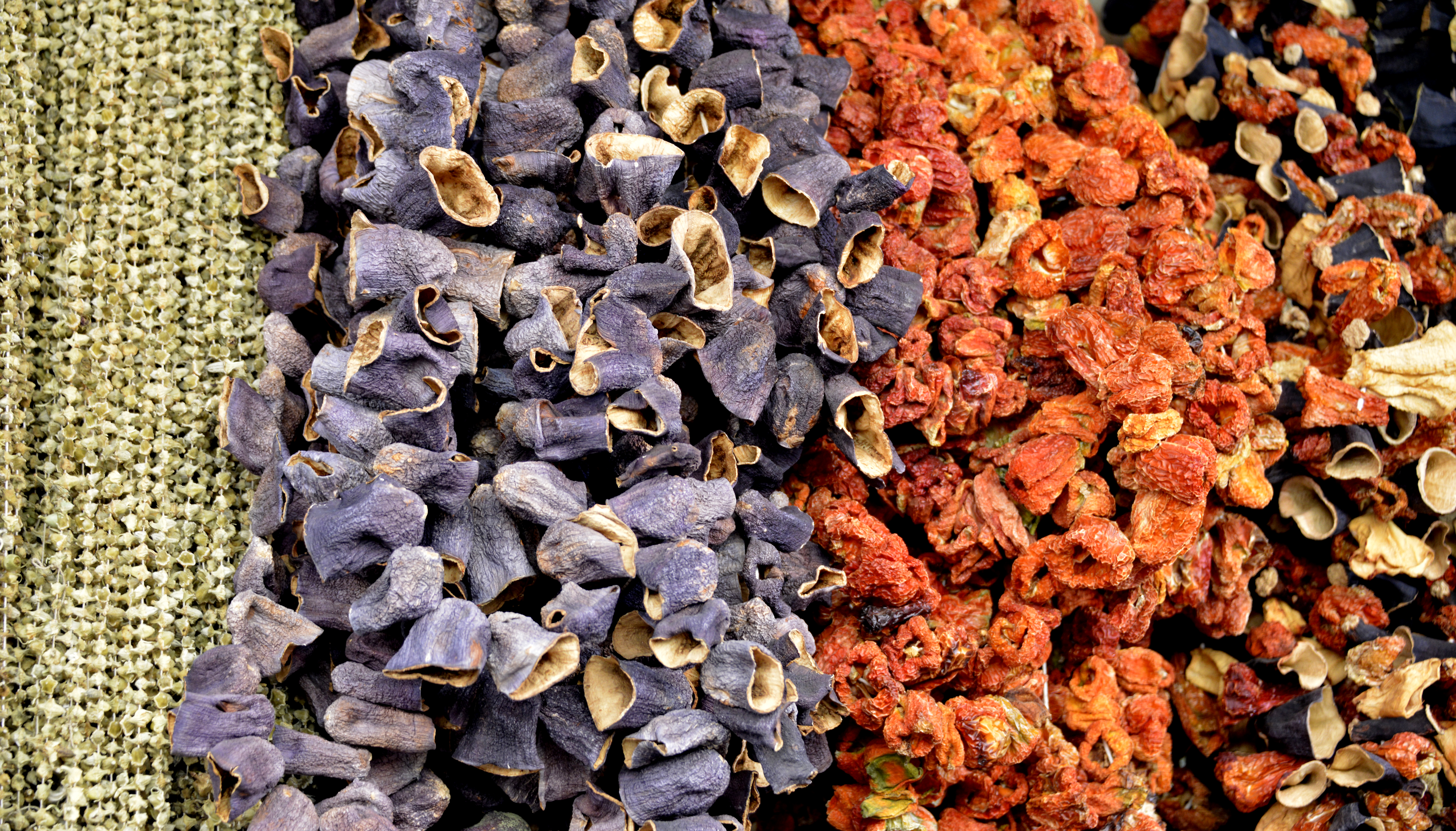
Dried vegetables

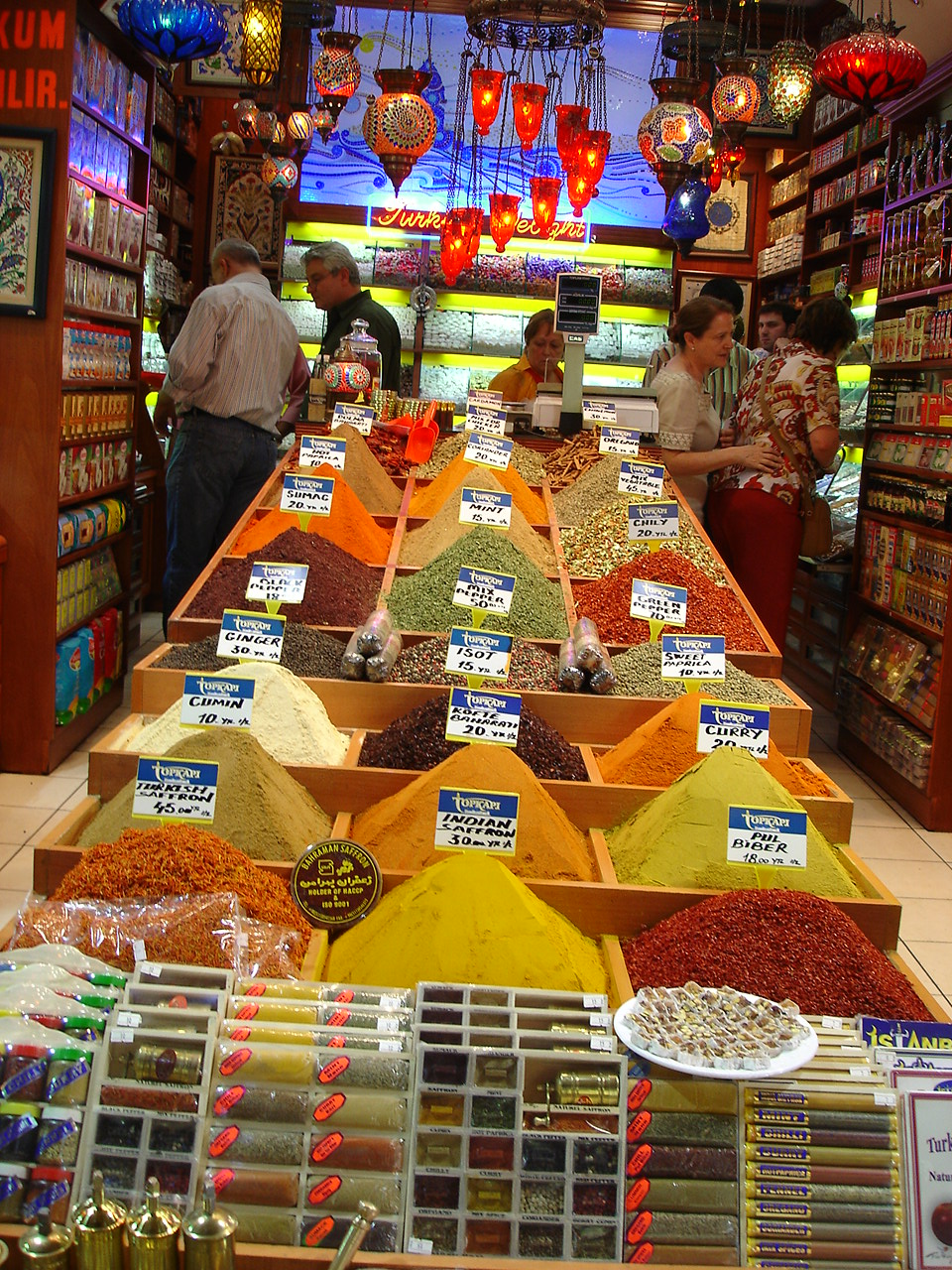
A stall in the bazaar

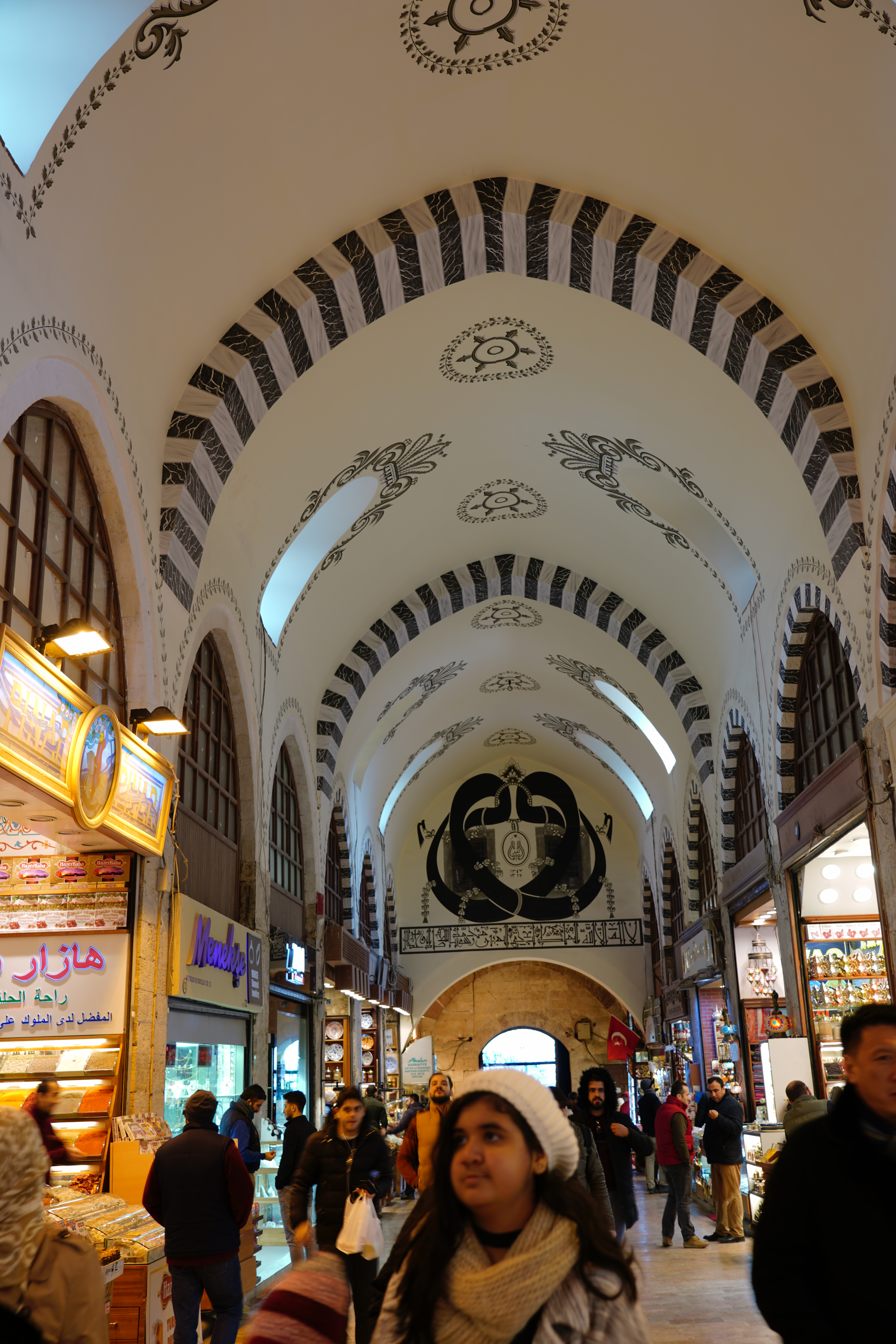
Main street of the bazaar

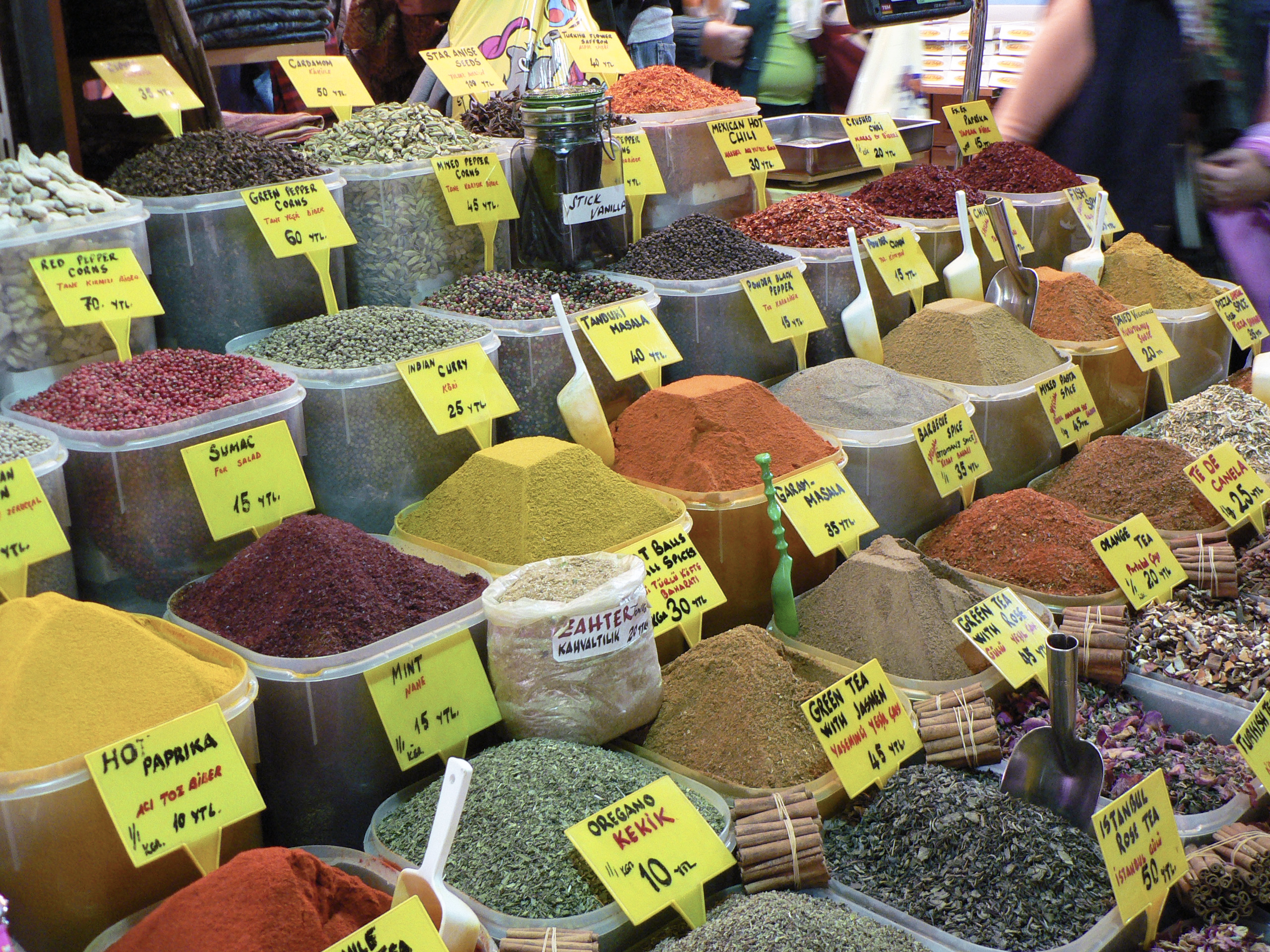
Spices

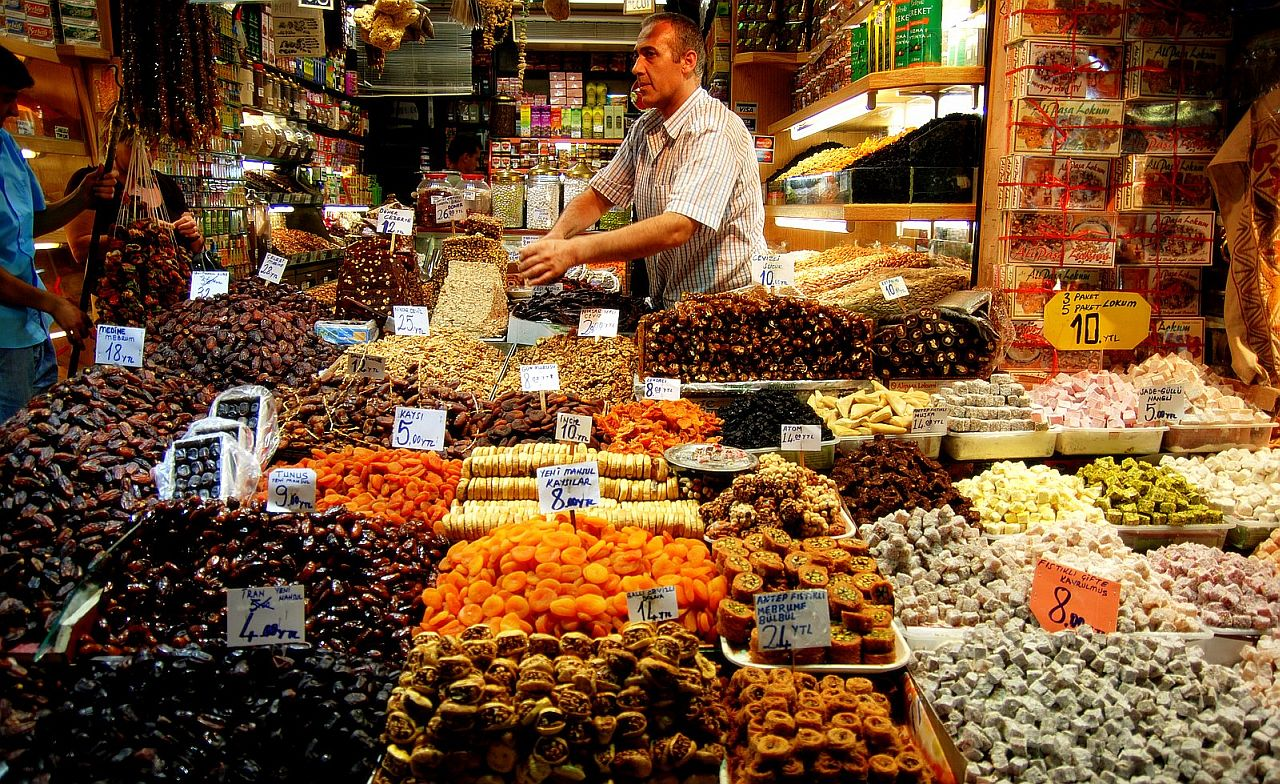
Dried fruits

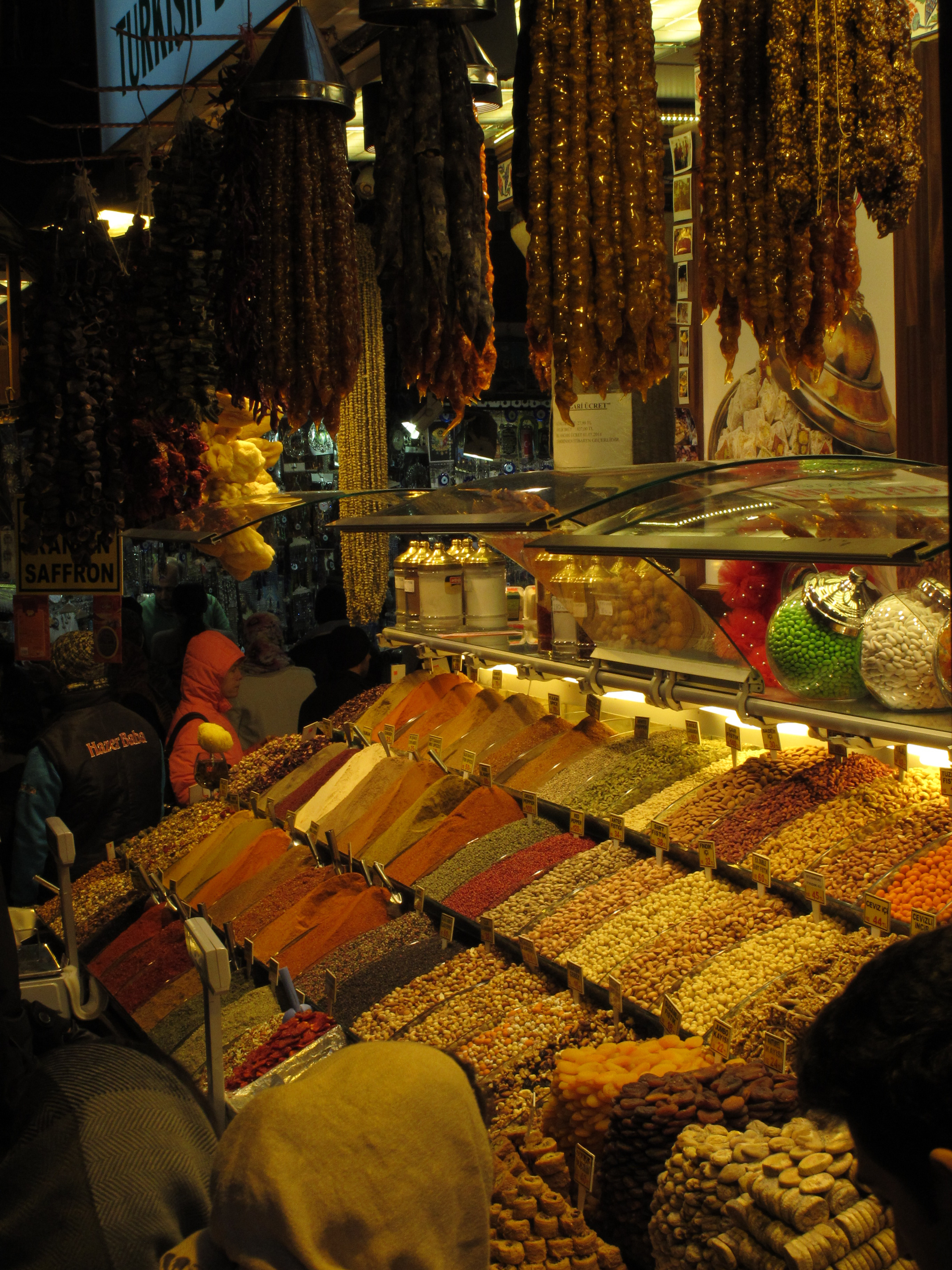
Inside the Bazaar

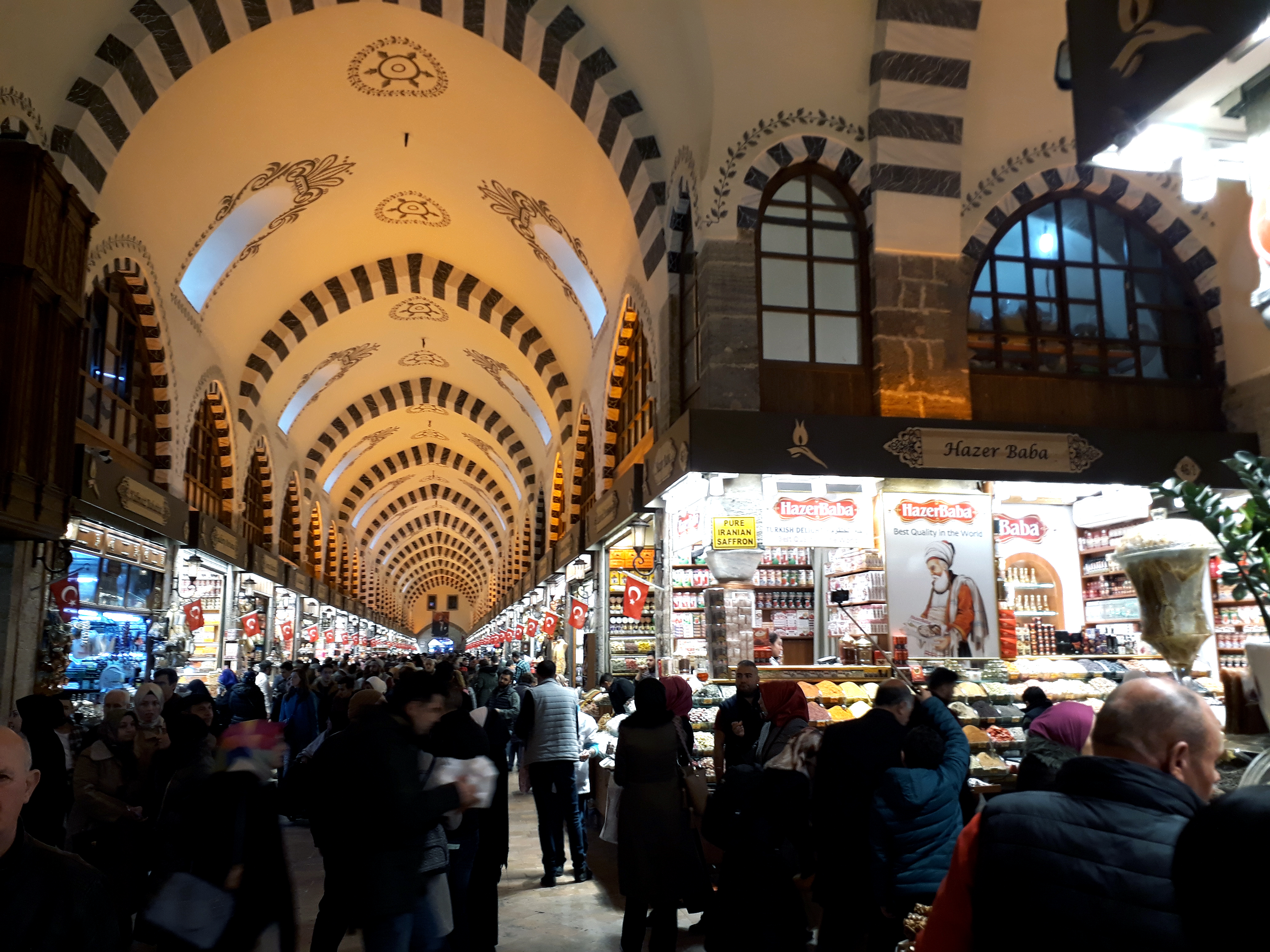
Inside the Bazaar

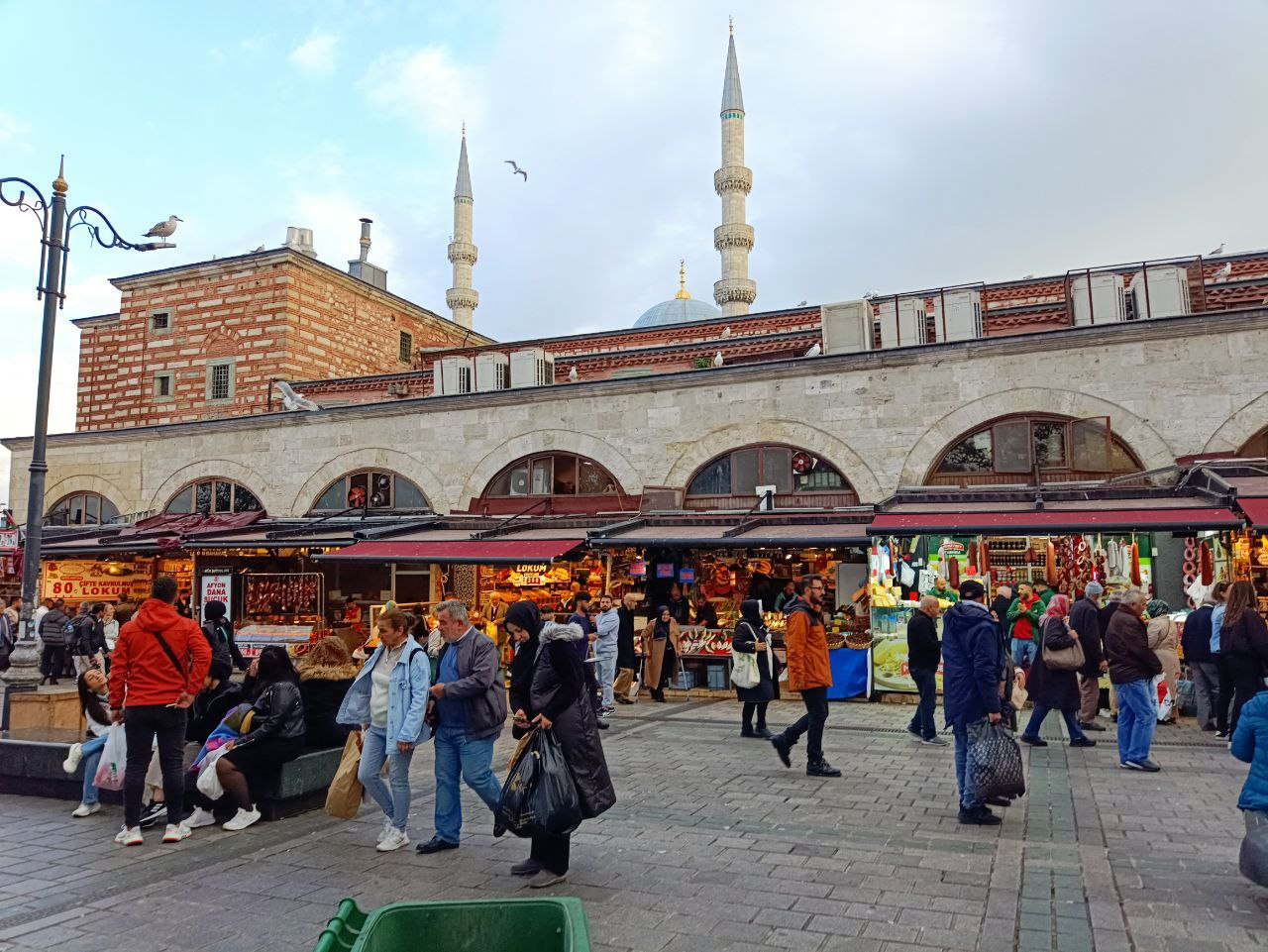
Entrance to the Bazaar

== See also ==
- Bazaari
- List of streets, hans and gates in Grand Bazaar, Istanbul
- List of shopping malls in Istanbul
- Tabriz Bazaar, the largest covered bazaar in the world.

== Sources ==
- Freely, John (2000). Blue Guide Istanbul. W. W. Norton & Company. ISBN 978-0-393-32014-5.
