= Grand Bazaar, Istanbul =

Marketplace in Turkey

Grand Bazaar
- Kapalıçarşı
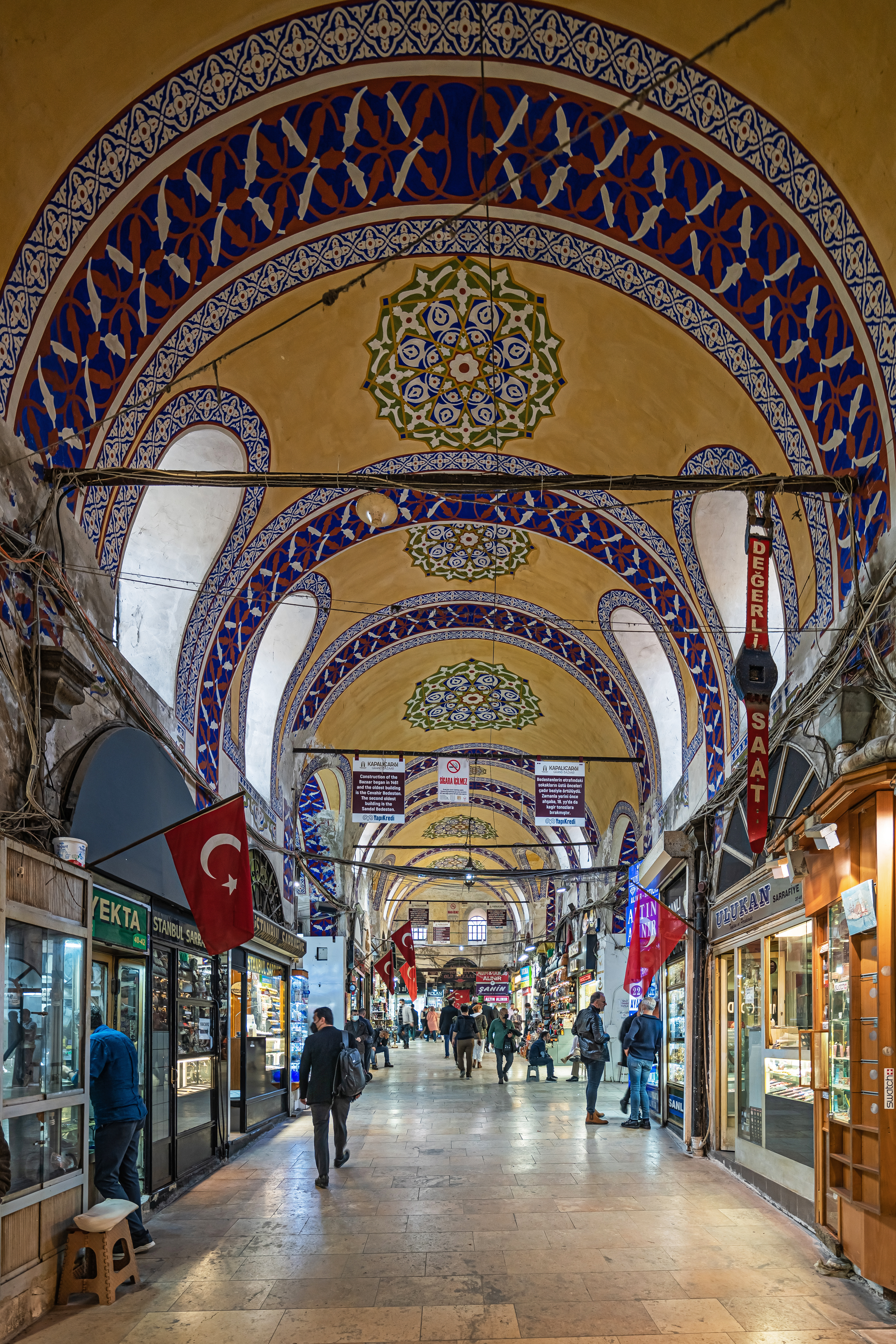
- Inside the Grand Bazaar in Istanbul
- Interactive map of Grand Bazaar
- Location: Istanbul, Turkey
- Coordinates: 41°0′38.09″N 28°58′4.56″E
- Type: Covered bazaar
- Beginning date: 1455; 571 years ago
- Completion date: after 1730
- Dedicated to: Mehmed II

The Grand Bazaar (Turkish: Kapalıçarşı, meaning ‘Covered Market’; also Büyük Çarşı, meaning ‘Grand Market’) in Istanbul is one of the largest and oldest covered markets in the world, with 61 covered streets and over 4,000 shops on a total area of 30,700 m^{2}, attracting between 250,000 and 400,000 visitors daily. In 2014, it was listed No.1 among the world's most-visited tourist attractions with 91,250,000 annual visitors. The Grand Bazaar in Istanbul is often regarded as one of the first shopping malls of the world.

== Location ==
The Grand Bazaar is located inside the walled city of Istanbul, in the district of Fatih and in the neighbourhood (mahalle) bearing the same name (Kapalıçarşı). It stretches roughly from west to east between the mosques of Beyazit and of Nuruosmaniye. The Bazaar can easily be reached from Sultanahmet and Sirkeci by trams (Beyazıt-Kapalıçarşı stop).

== History ==
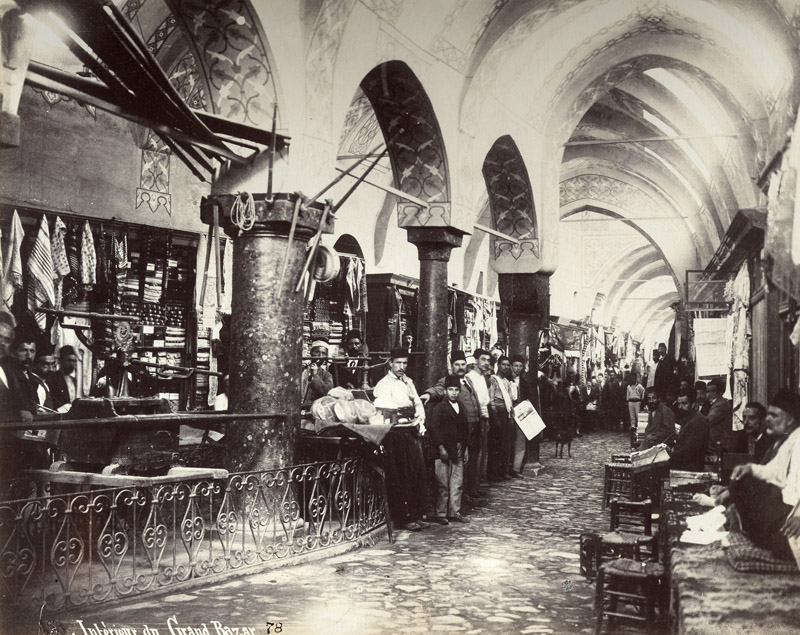
The interior of the Grand Bazaar in the 1890s, by photographer Jean Pascal Sébah

The construction of the future Grand Bazaar's core started during the winter of 1455/56, shortly after the Ottoman conquest of Constantinople and was part of a broader initiative to stimulate economic prosperity in Istanbul. Sultan Mehmed II had an edifice erected devoted to the trading of textiles and jewels near his palace in Constantinople. It was named Cevâhir Bedestan ("Bedesten of Gems") and was also known as Bezzâzistan-ı Cedîd ("New Bedesten") in Ottoman Turkish. The word bedesten is adapted from the Persian word bezestan, derived from bez ("cloth"), and means "bazaar of the cloth sellers". The building – named alternately in Turkish İç ("Internal"), Antik ("Ancient"), or Eski ("Old") Bedesten – lies on the slope of the third hill of Istanbul, between the ancient Fora of Constantine and of Theodosius. It was also near the first sultan's palace, the Old Palace (Eski Saray), which was also in construction in those same years, and not far from the Artopoleia (in Greek) (Ἀρτοπωλεῖα), the city's bakers' quarter in Byzantine times.

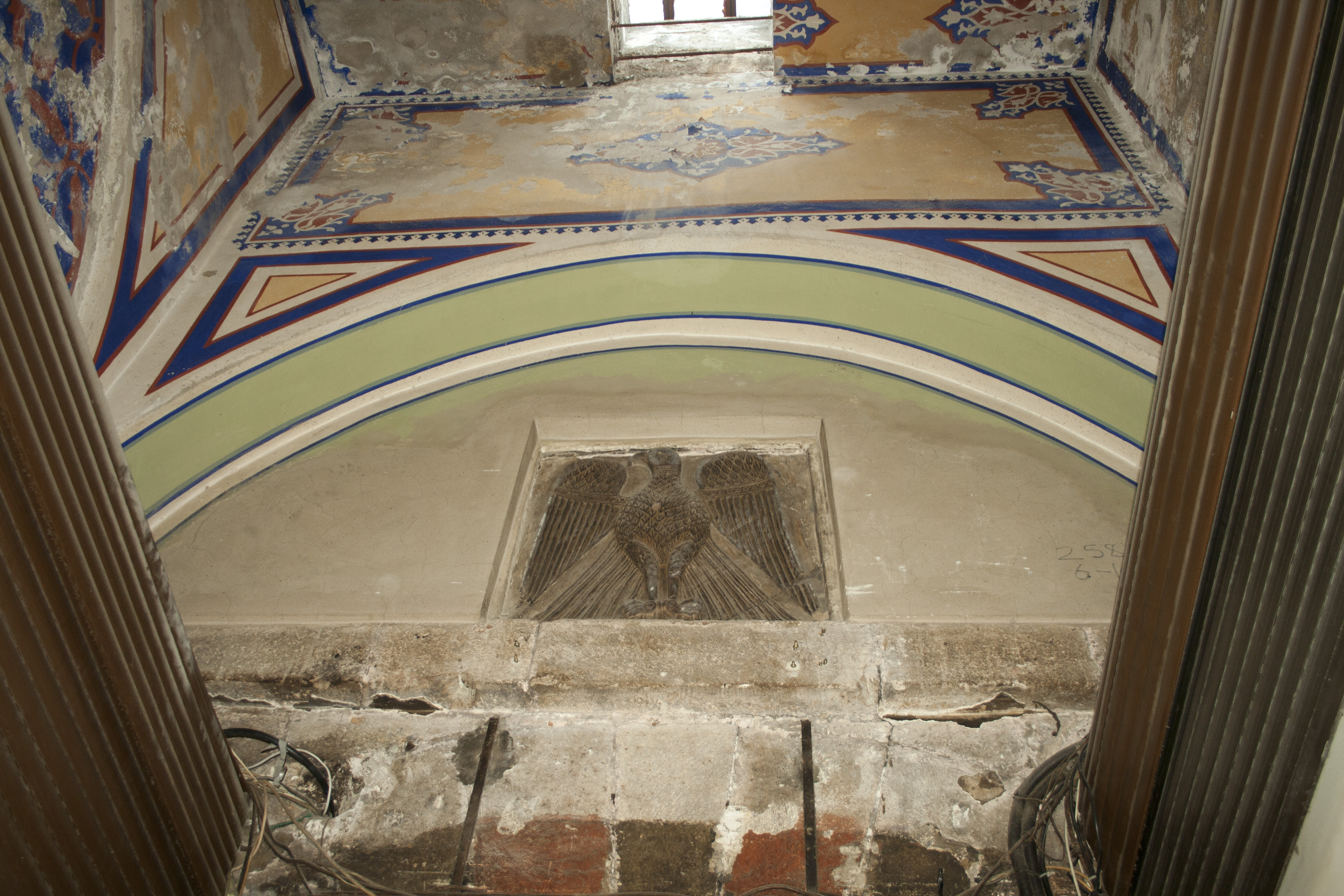
The Byzantine (Comnenian) Eagle outside the eastern gate of the Old Bedesten

The construction of the Bedesten ended in the winter of 1460/61, and the building was endowed to the waqf of the Hagia Sophia Mosque. Analysis of the brickwork shows that most of the structure originates from the second half of the 15th century, although a Byzantine relief representing a Comnenian eagle, still enclosed on the top of the East Gate (Kuyumcular Kapısı)) of the Bedesten has been used by several scholars as proof that the edifice was a Byzantine structure.

In a market near the Bedesten, named in Turkish Esir Pazarı, the slave trade was active, a use also carried over from Byzantine times. Other important markets in the vicinity were the second-hand market (Turkish: Bit Pazarı), the "Long Market" (Uzun Çarşı), corresponding to the Greek Makros Embolos (Μακρὸς Ἔμβολος, "Long Portico"), a long porticoed mall stretching downhill from the Forum of Constantine to the Golden Horn, which was one of the main market areas of the city, while the old book market (Sahaflar Çarşısı) was moved from the Bazaar to the present picturesque location near the Beyazid Mosque only after the 1894 Istanbul earthquake.

Some years later —according to other sources, this occurred in 1545 under Sultan Suleiman I—Mehmed II had another covered market built, the "Sandal Bedesten" (the name comes from a kind of thread woven in Bursa, which had the colour of sandalwood), also named Küçük ("Little"), Cedit or Yeni (both words meaning "New") Bedesten, which lay north of the first.

After the erection of the Sandal Bedesten the trade in textiles moved there, while the Cevahir Bedesten was reserved for the trade in luxury goods. At the beginning the two buildings were isolated. According to the 16th-century French traveller Pierre Gilles, between them and the Mosque of Beyazid stood the ruins of churches and a large cistern. However, soon many sellers opened their shops between and around them, so that a whole quarter was born, devoted exclusively to commerce.

At the beginning of the 17th century the Grand Bazaar had already achieved its final shape. The enormous extent of the Ottoman Empire in three continents, and the total control of road communications between Asia and Europe, rendered the Bazaar and the surrounding hans or caravanserais the hub of the Mediterranean trade. According to several European travelers, at that time, and until the first half of the 19th century, the market was unrivaled in Europe with regards to the abundance, variety and quality of the goods on sale. At that time we know from European travelers that the Grand Bazaar had a square plan, with two perpendicular main roads crossing in the middle and a third road running along the outer perimeter. In the Bazaar there were 67 roads (each bearing the name of the sellers of a particular good), several squares used for the daily prayers, 5 mosques, 7 fountains, 18 gates which were opened each day in the morning and closed in the evening. Around 1638 the Turkish traveller Evliya Çelebi gave us the most important historical description of the Bazaar and of its customs. The number of shops amounted to 3,000, plus 300 located in the surrounding hans, large caravanserais with two or three stories round a porticoed inner courtyard, where goods could be stored and merchants could be lodged. In that period one tenth of the shops of the city were concentrated in the market and around it. For all that, at that time the market was not yet covered.

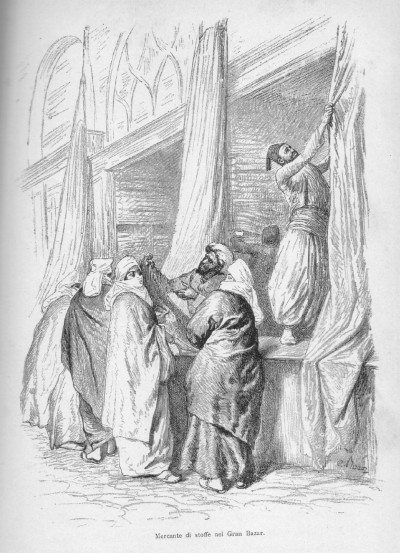
A dolap in a drawing of Cesare Biseo, from Edmondo De Amicis's Costantinopoli (1882 edition)

Recurrent calamities, fires and earthquakes hit the Grand Bazaar. The first fire occurred in 1515; another in 1548. Other fires ravaged the complex in 1588, 1618 (when the Bit Pazarı was destroyed), 1645, 1652, 1658, 1660 (on that occasion the whole city was devastated), 1687, 1688 (great damage occurred to the Uzun Çarşı) 1695, and 1701. The fire of 1701 was particularly fierce, forcing Grand Vizier Nevşehirli Damad Ibrahim Pasha to rebuild several parts of the complex in 1730–1731. In 1738 the Kızlar Ağası Beşir Ağa endowed the Fountain (still existing) near Mercan Kapı.

In this period, because of the new law against fires issued in 1696, several parts of the market which lay between the two Bedesten were covered with vaults. Despite that, other fires ravaged the complex in 1750 and 1791. The quake of 1766 caused more damages, which were repaired by the Court Chief Architect (Hassa Baş Mimarı) Ahmet a year later.

The 19th-century growth of the textile industry in western Europe, introduction of mass production methods, the capitulations signed between the Empire and many European countries, and the forestalling – always by European merchants – of the raw materials needed to produce goods in the Empire's closed economy, were factors which caused the Market's decline. By 1850, rents in Bedesten were ten times lower than two to three decades before. Moreover, the birth of a West-oriented bourgeoisie and the commercial success of Western products pushed the merchants belonging to the minorities (Greek, Armenian, Jewish) into moving out of the Bazaar, perceived as antiquated, and into opening new shops in quarters frequented by Europeans, such as Pera and Galata.

According to an 1890 survey, in the Bazaar there were 4,399 active shops, 2 bedesten, 2195 rooms, 1 hamam, one mosque, 10 medrese, 19 fountains (among them two şadırvan and one sebil), one mausoleum and 24 han. In the 30.7 hectares of the complex, protected by 18 gates, there are 3,000 shops along 61 streets, the 2 bedesten, 13 han (plus several more outside).

The last major catastrophe happened in 1894: a strong earthquake that rocked Istanbul. The Minister of Public Works, Mahmud Celaleddin Pasha, supervised the repair of the damaged Bazaar until 1898, and on this occasion the complex was reduced in area. To the west, the Bit Pazarı was left outside the new perimeter and became an open-sky road, named Çadırcılar Caddesi ("Tentmaker Road"), while the old gate and the Kütkculer Kapi were demolished. Among all the hans which belonged to the Market, many were left outside, and only nine remained enclosed in the structure.

In 1914 the Sandal Bedesten, whose handlers of textile goods had been ruined by the European competition, was acquired by the city of Istanbul and, starting one year later, was used as an auction house, mainly for carpets. In 1927 the individual parts of the bazaar and the streets got official names. The last fires of the bazaar happened in 1943 and 1954, and the related restorations were finished on 28 July 1959.

The last restoration of the complex took place in 1980. On that occasion, advertising posters around the market were also removed.

== Architecture ==
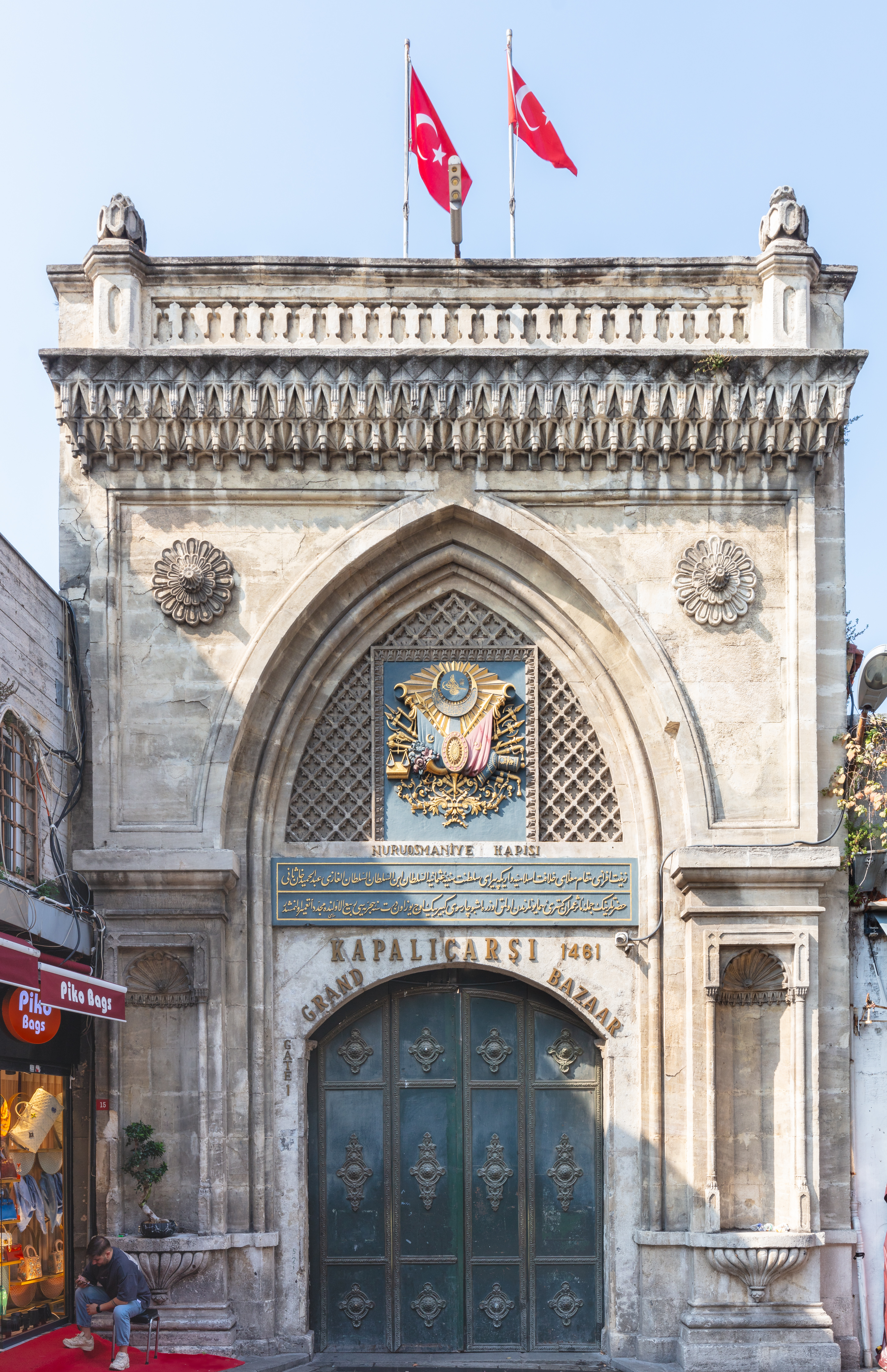
Nuruosmaniye Gate of the Grand Bazaar

The Iç Bedesten has a rectangular plan (43.30 m x 29.50 m). Two rows of stone piers, four in each row, sustain three rows of bays, five in each row. Each bay is surmounted by a brick dome with blind drum. In the inner and in the outer walls have been built 44 cellars (Turkish: mahzen), vaulted rooms without external openings. The sunlight in Bedesten comes from rectangular windows placed right under the roof: they can be accessed through a wooden ambulatory. Due to the scarce illumination, the edifice was kept open only some hours each day, and was devoted to the trade of luxury goods, above all textiles. Moreover, the Bedesten's Mahzen were also used as safes. The building can be accessed through four gates:

- "Second-hand Book Sellers' Gate" (Sahaflar Kapısı) in the north,
- "Skullcap Sellers' Gate" (Takkeciler Kapısı) in the south,
- "Jewellers' Gate" (Kuyumcular Kapısı) in the east, and;
- "Women's Clothiers' Gate" (Zenneciler Kapısı) in the west.

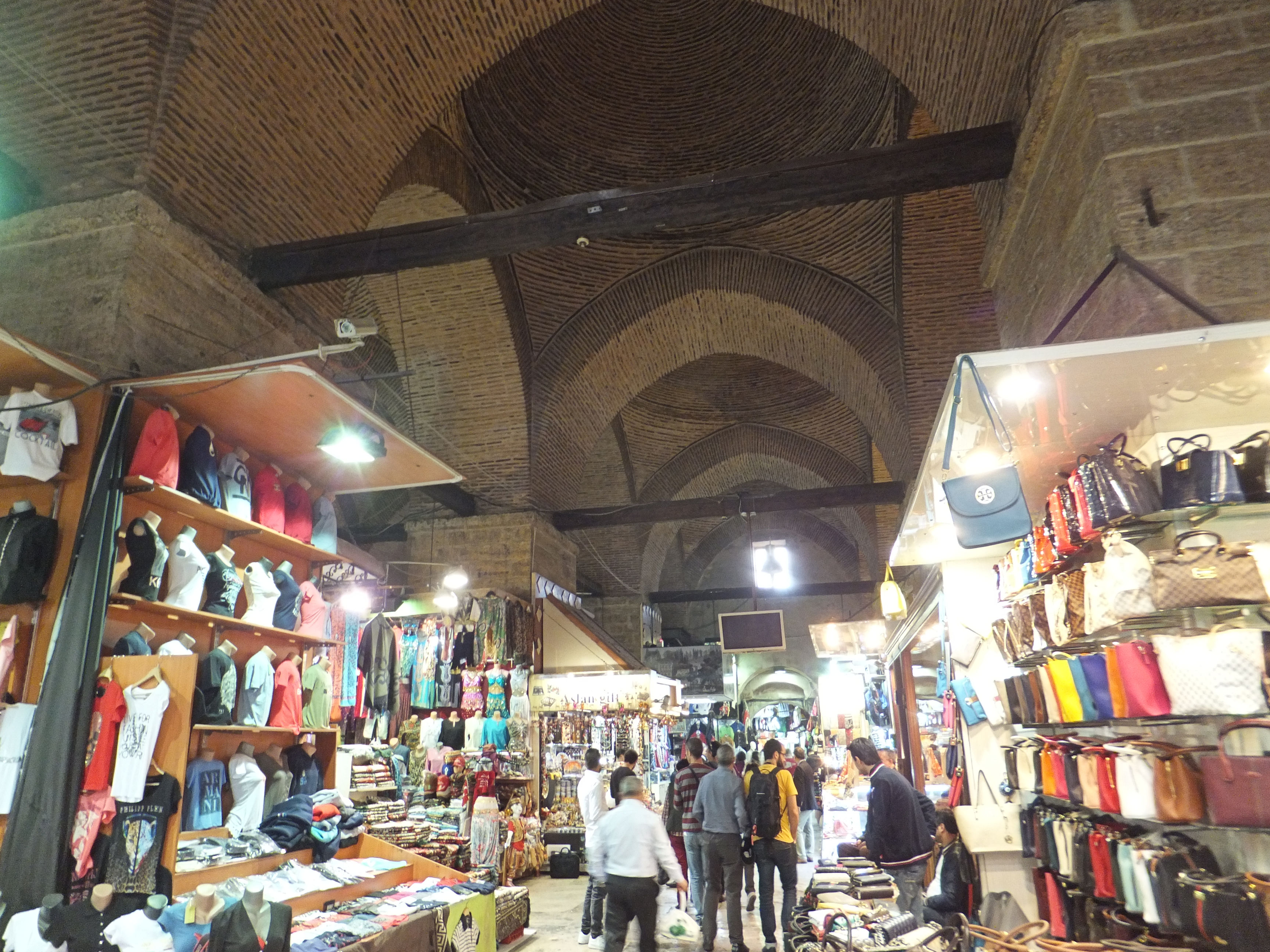
The domed interior of the Sandal Bedesten

The Sandal Bedesten has also a rectangular plan (40.20 m × 42.20 m), with 12 stone piers bearing 20 bays surmounted by brick domes with blind drum. In this case shops are carved only in the outer walls. In both edifices, each bay is tied to the others through brick arches tied by juniper beams, and masonry is made with rubble. Both buildings were closed by iron gates.

Aside from the bedestens, originally the Grand Bazaar structures were built with wood, and only after the 1700 fire, they were rebuilt in stone and brickwork, and covered. All the bazaar edifices, except the fur dealers market (Turkish: Kürkçüler Çarsısı), a later addition which is two-story, are one story. The roofs are mainly covered with tiles, while the part burnt in 1954 uses now tarmac. In the bazaar no artificial light was foreseen, also to prevent fires, and smoking was strictly prohibited. The roads outside the inner Bedesten are roughly parallel to it. The damages caused by the many fires and quakes along the centuries, together with the repairs done without a general plan, gave to the market – especially in its western part – a picturesque appearance, with its maze of roads and lanes crossing each other at various angles.

== Social history of the Grand Bazaar ==
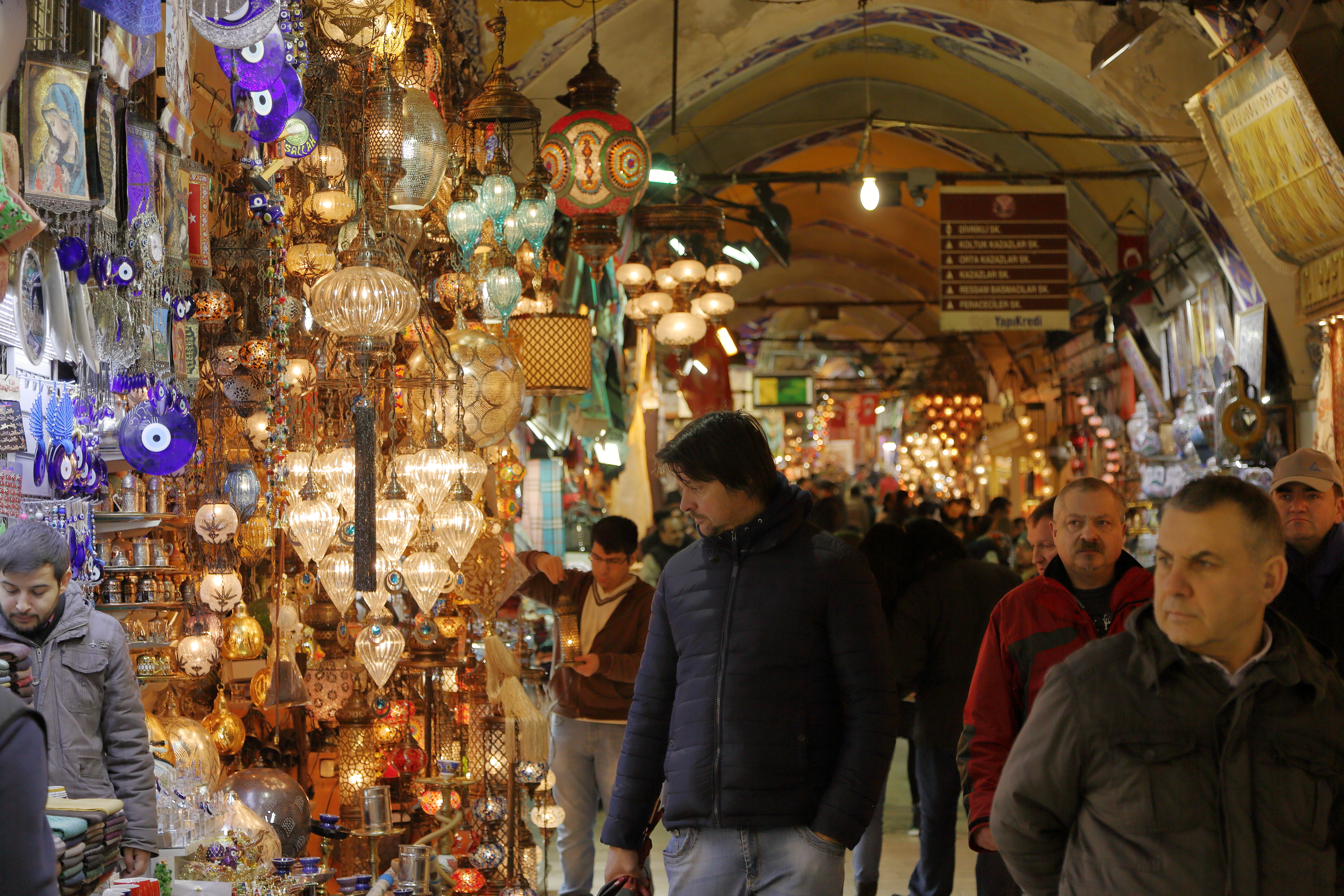
Kalpakçılar Caddesi, the gold jewellers' road, is one of the 61 covered streets inside the Grand Bazaar.

Until the restoration following the quake of 1894, the Grand Bazaar had no shops as found in the western world: along both sides of the roads merchants sat on wooden divans in front of their shelves. Each of them occupied a space 6 to 8 feet (1.8 to 2.4 m) in width, and 3 to 4 feet (0.91 to 1.22 m) in depth. This was named in Turkish dolap, meaning 'stall'. The most precious merchandise was not on display, but kept in cabinets. Only clothes were hung in long rows, with a picturesque effect. A prospective client could sit in front of the dealer, talk with him and drink a tea or a Turkish coffee, in a relaxed way. At the end of the day, each stall was closed with drapes. Another peculiarity was the complete lack of advertising. Moreover, as everywhere in the East, traders of the same type of goods were forcibly concentrated along one road, which got its name from their profession. The Inner Bedesten hosted the most precious wares: jewelers, armourers, crystal dealers had their shops there. The Sandal Bedesten was mainly the center of the silk trade, but also other goods were on sale there. The most picturesque parts of the market were – apart from the two Bedestens – the shoe market (Turkish: Pabuççular Pazarı), where thousands of shoes of different colors (Ottoman sumptuary laws prescribed yellow shoes for Muslims, blue for Greek Orthodox, black for Jews and red for Armenians) were on display on high shelves; the spice and herbs market (later concentrated in the Egyptian Bazaar), which stood near the jewelers; the armour and weapon market; the old book market; and the flea market.

This kind of organization disappeared gradually, although nowadays a concentration of the same business along certain roads can be observed again:

- Jewellers and gold bracelets along Kalpakçılar Caddesi;
- Gold bracelets along Kuyumcular Çarşısı;
- Furniture along Divrikli Caddesi;
- Carpets along Sahaflar Caddesi;
- Leather goods along Perdahçılar Caddesi
- Leather and casual clothes at the Bit Pazarı.

Actually, the main reason of concentrating the trade in one place was to provide the highest security against theft, fire and uprising. The goods in the Bedesten were guaranteed against everything except turmoil. Gates were always closed at night, and the bazaar was patrolled by guards paid by the merchants' guilds. In order to access the complex during night hours, an imperial edict was required. The only official night opening in the history of the Bazaar occurred in 1867 during the feast organized for the return of Sultan Abdülaziz from Egypt, when the sovereign crossed the illuminated market riding a horse among the rejoicing populace. Despite the immense wealth present in the Bazaar over the centuries—as an English traveller recorded as late as c. 1870, a tour of the inner Bedesten could easily ruin a few Rothschild families—theft occurred extremely rarely. The most important such incident happened in 1591, when 30,000 gold coins (Turkish: Altın) were stolen in the old Bedesten. The theft shocked the whole of Istanbul, the Bazaar remained closed for two weeks and people were tortured, until the money was found hidden under a floor matting. The culprit was a young Persian musk seller. Thanks to the intercession of the Sultan Murad III he was executed by hanging and not by torture.

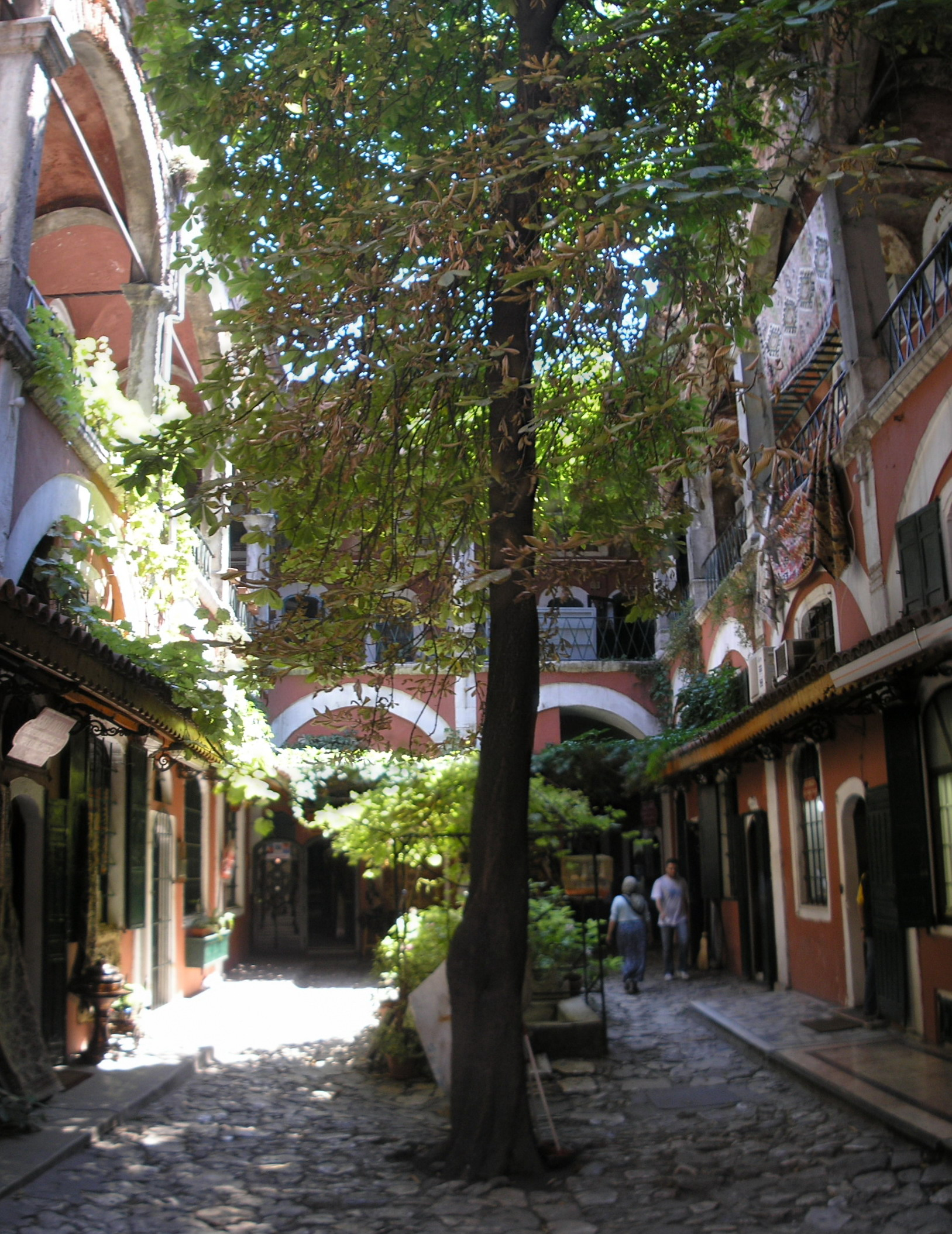
The Zincirli Hanı, a former caravansary where jewelry is now produced.

Right during the westernization of Ottoman society, the Grand Bazaar became an obligatory topos of the romantic literature. We owe descriptions of the Bazaar in the middle of the 19th century to writers such as Edmondo De Amicis and Théophile Gautier.

Another peculiarity of the market during the Ottoman age was the total lack of restaurants. The absence of women in the social life and the nomadic conventions in the Turkish society made the concept of restaurant alien. Merchants brought their lunch in a food box called sefertas, and the only food on sale was simple dishes such as doner kebab, tavuk göğsü (a dessert prepared with chicken breast, milk sugar and rose water sprinkled on it) and Turkish coffee. These simple dishes were prepared and served in small two-story kiosks placed in the middle of a road. The most famous among these kiosks is the one—still extant but not functioning any more—placed at the crossing of Halıcılar Caddesi and Acı Çesme Caddesi. It is alleged that Sultan Mahmud II came there often in disguise to eat his pudding. The Bazaar was in the Ottoman Age the place where the Istanbullu (the inhabitants of the city) could see each other. Not only was the market the only place in town where the ladies could go relatively easily (and this circumstance made the place especially interesting for the Europeans who visited the city), but—especially from the Tanzimat age on—it was also the only public place where the average citizen had a chance to meet the members of the Imperial Harem and of the Court casually.

The Bazaar's merchants were organized in guilds. In order to establish a new one, it was only necessary to have enough traders of the same good. Afterwards, a monopoly was formed and the number of traders and shops was frozen. One could only be accepted in the guild through co-optation, either as son of a deceased member, or after paying a suitable sum to a member who wanted to retire.

The guild's chief was a public officer called Kethüda. He was paid by the guild but appointed by the Kadı of Istanbul. Fixation of prices and taxes were matter of the Kethüda. He was joined by a representative of the guild's member, called Yiğitbaşı ('chief of the brave young fellows'). These two officers were flanked by the assembly of the elders, non necessarily old in age, but comprising the most experienced traders. Parallel to the guilds, there were purely religious organizations, called fütüvvet tariks. Their members met in Dervish shrines and performed religious functions. These organizations became less and less important with time due to the increased weight of the Greek, Armenian and Jews merchants in the bazaar's trade. Each guild had a financial department which collected a moderate monthly fee (some silver coins; Turkish: Kuruş) from the members and administered it taking care of the needs of each associated person. The guilds lost increasingly their importance during the Tanzimat period, and were abolished in 1913, being replaced by an association of Bazaar merchants. Nowadays, there are several merchant associations in the Bazaar, but none is representative of the whole seller community.

== The Grand Bazaar today ==
Today the Grand Bazaar is a large complex and employs 26,000 people. Visited by between 250,000 and 400,000 visitors daily, it is one of the major landmarks of Istanbul. It must compete with modern shopping malls common in Istanbul, but its beauty and fascination represent a formidable advantage for it. The head of the Grand Bazaar Artisans Association claimed that the complex was in 2011 – the year of its 550th birthday – the most visited monument in the world. A restoration project starting in 2012 should renew its infrastructure, heating and lighting systems. Moreover, the hans inside the Market will be renovated and later additions will be demolished. This project should finally solve the big problems of the market: for example, in the whole Bazaar there is no proper toilet facility. Moreover, the lack of controls in the past years allowed many dealers to remove columns and skive walls in their shops to gain space; this, together with the substitution of lead (stolen in the last years) with concrete on the market's roof, has created a great hazard when the earthquake expected in Istanbul in the next years will occur.

The Grand Bazaar is opened each day except Sundays and bank holidays from 9:00 until 19:00.

Grand Bazaar images
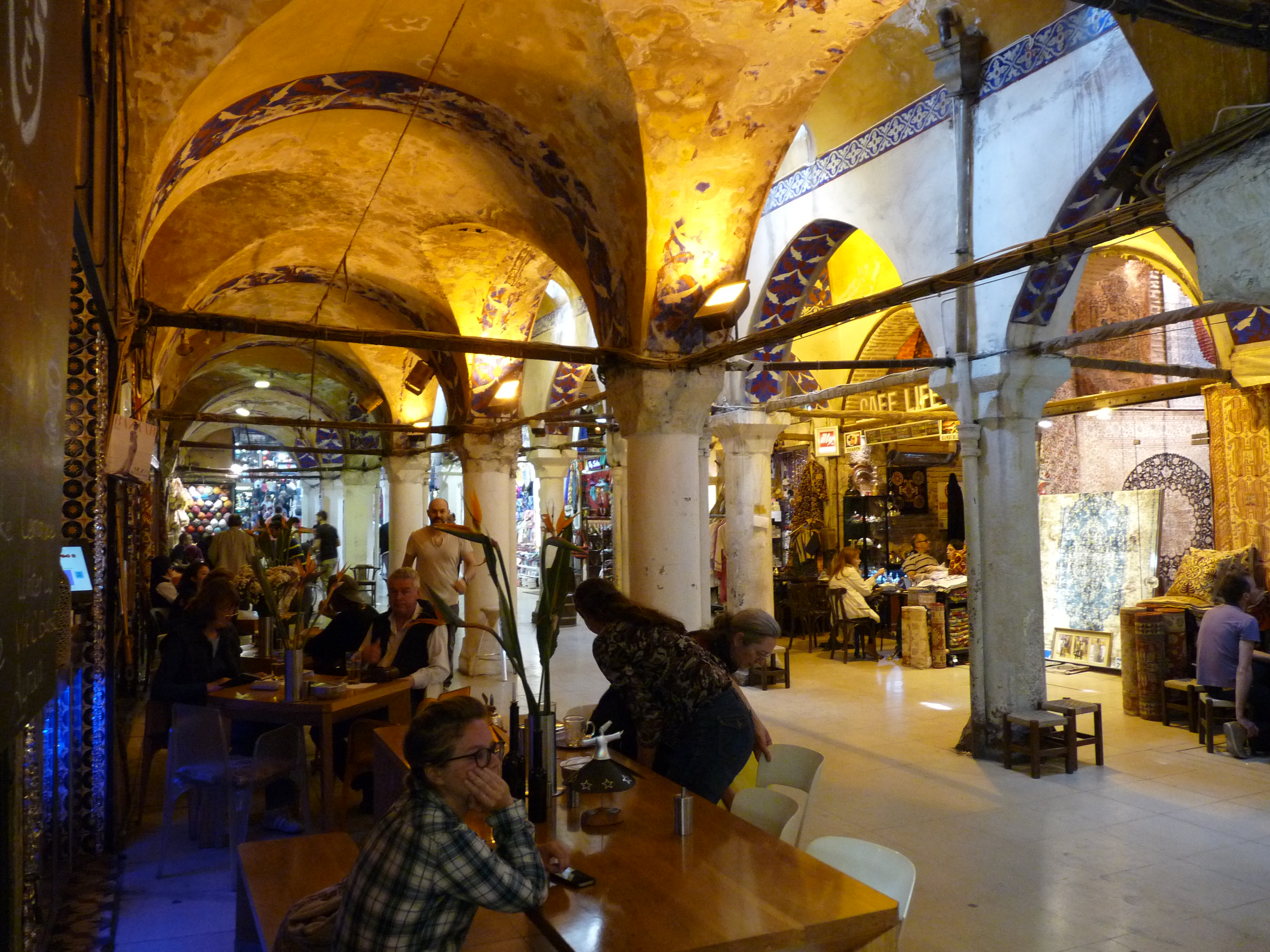
Café

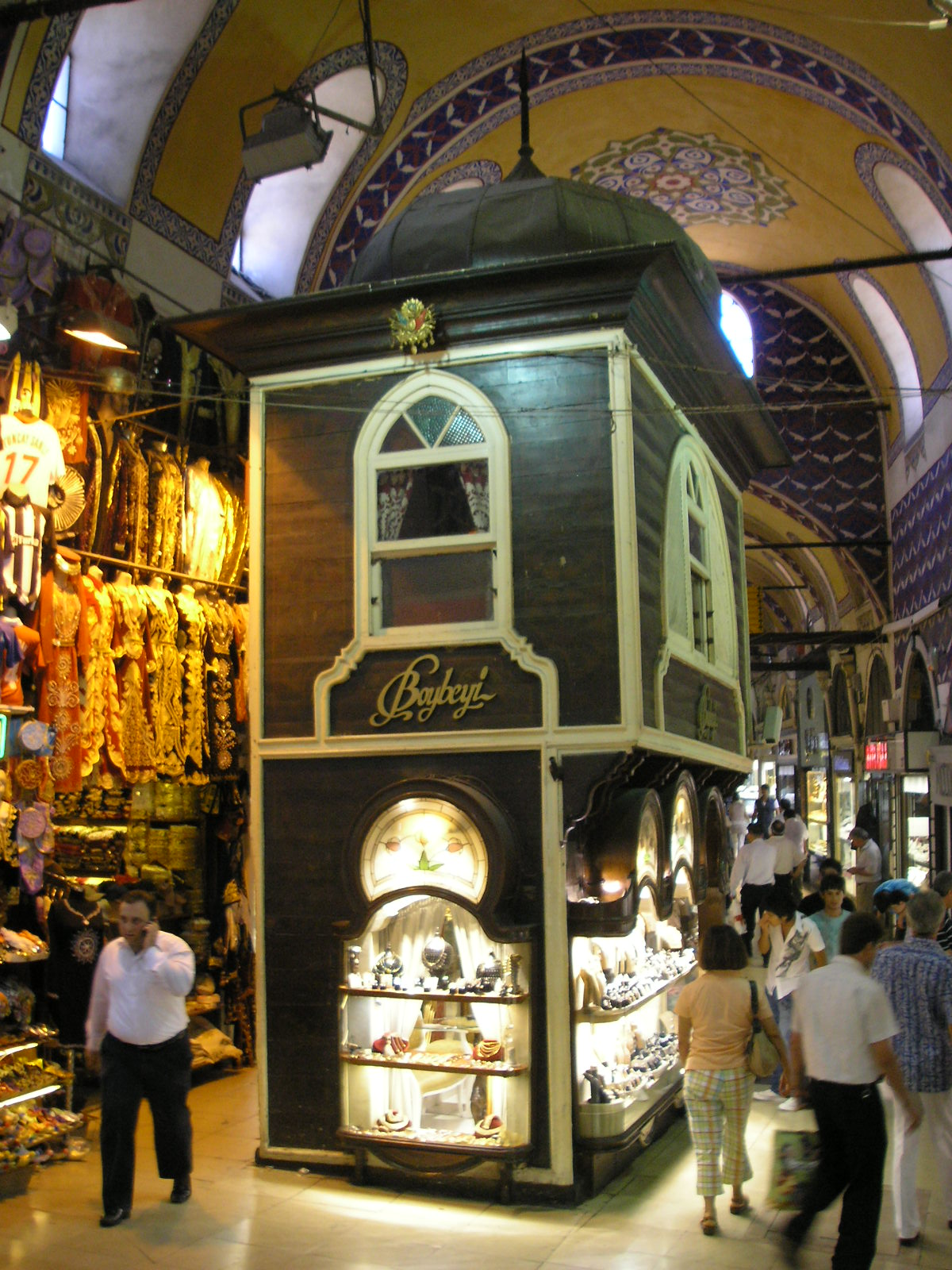
One of the 17th-century kiosks, which used to be a small cafe.

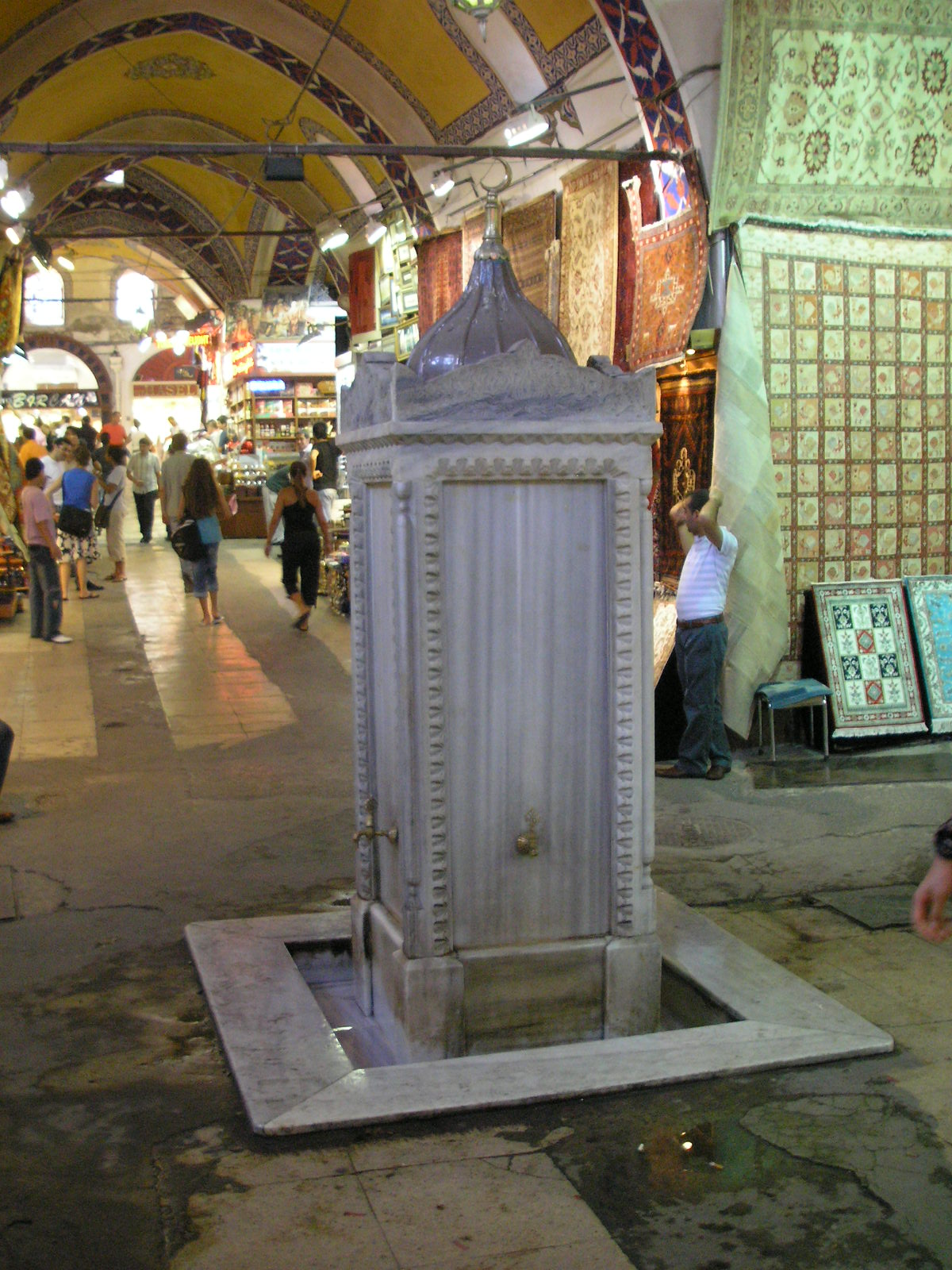
One of the four marble drinking fountains

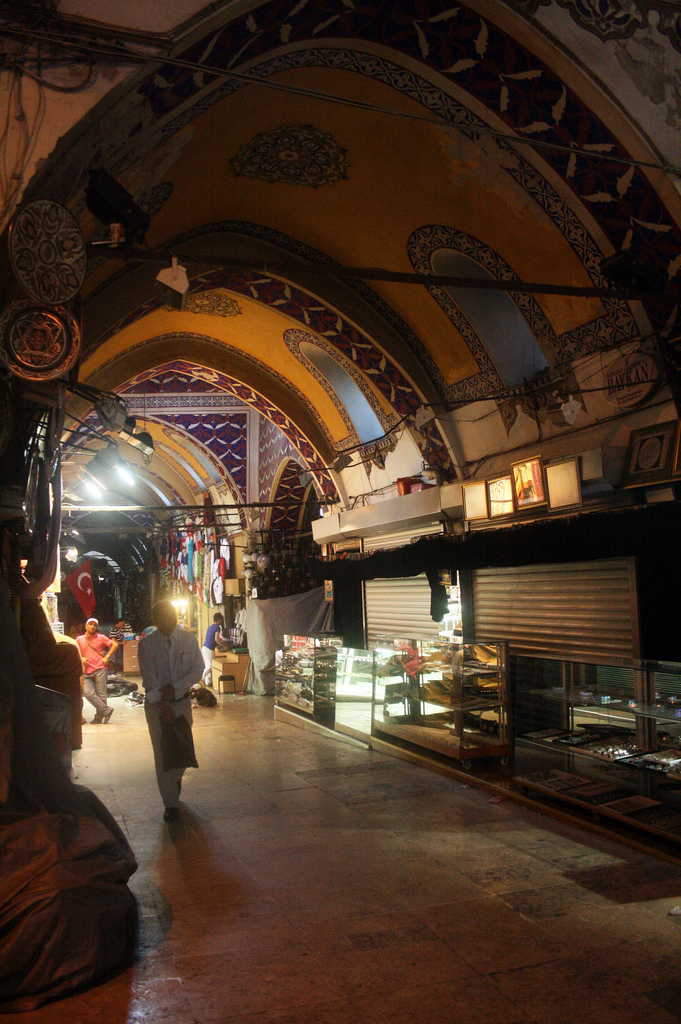
The Bazaar after closing hour.

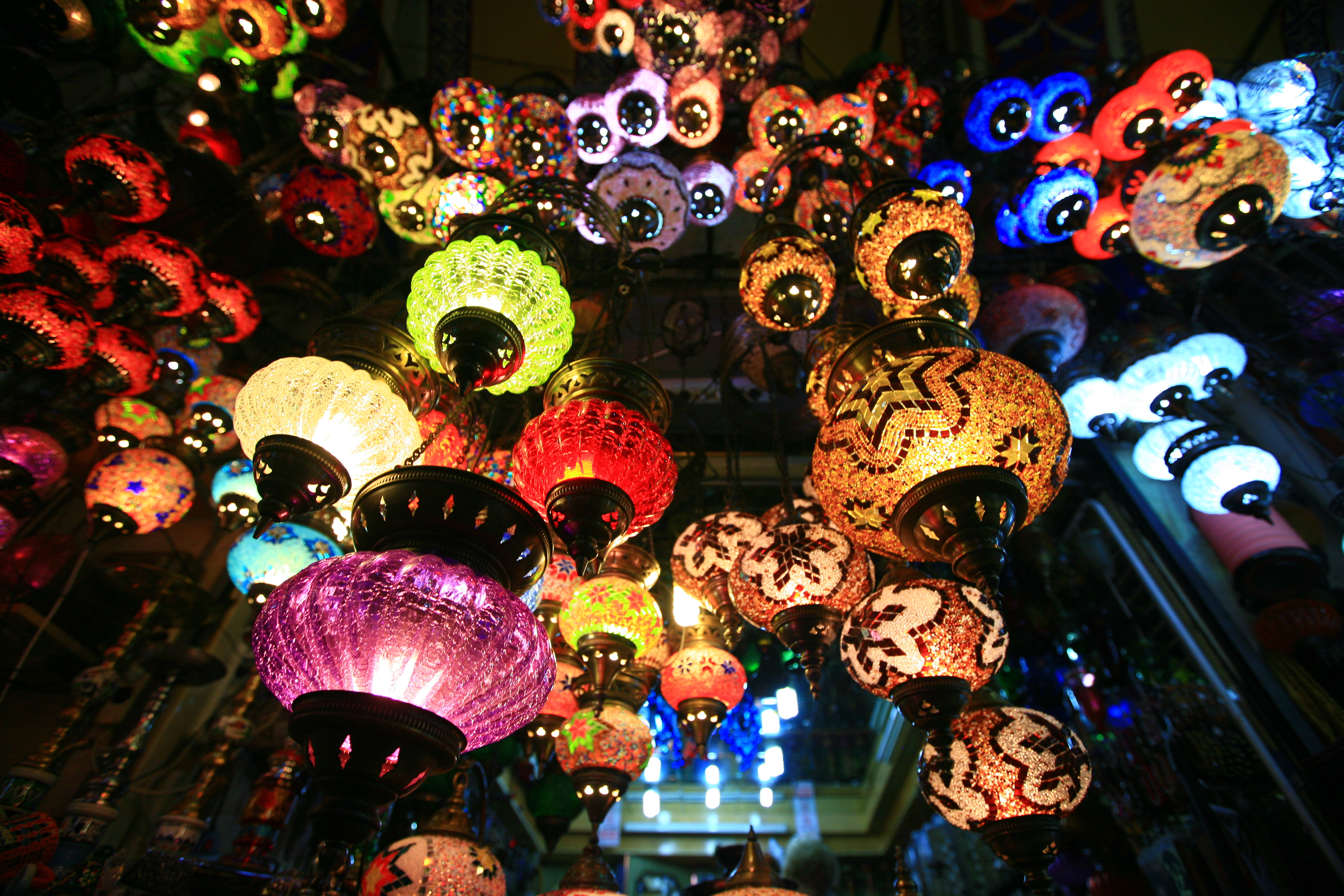
Lanterns hanging in a shop.

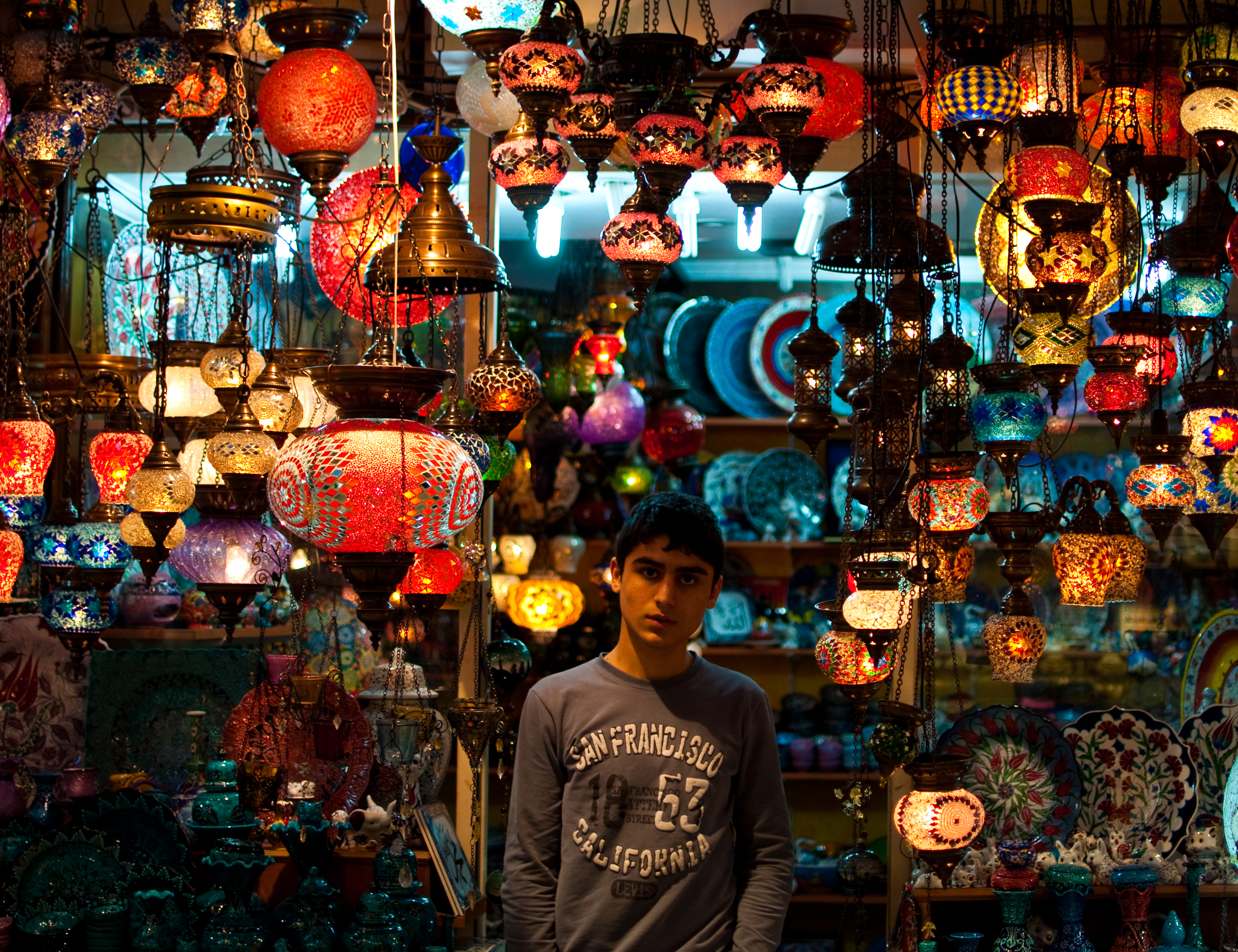
Teenager in the door of a lantern shop.

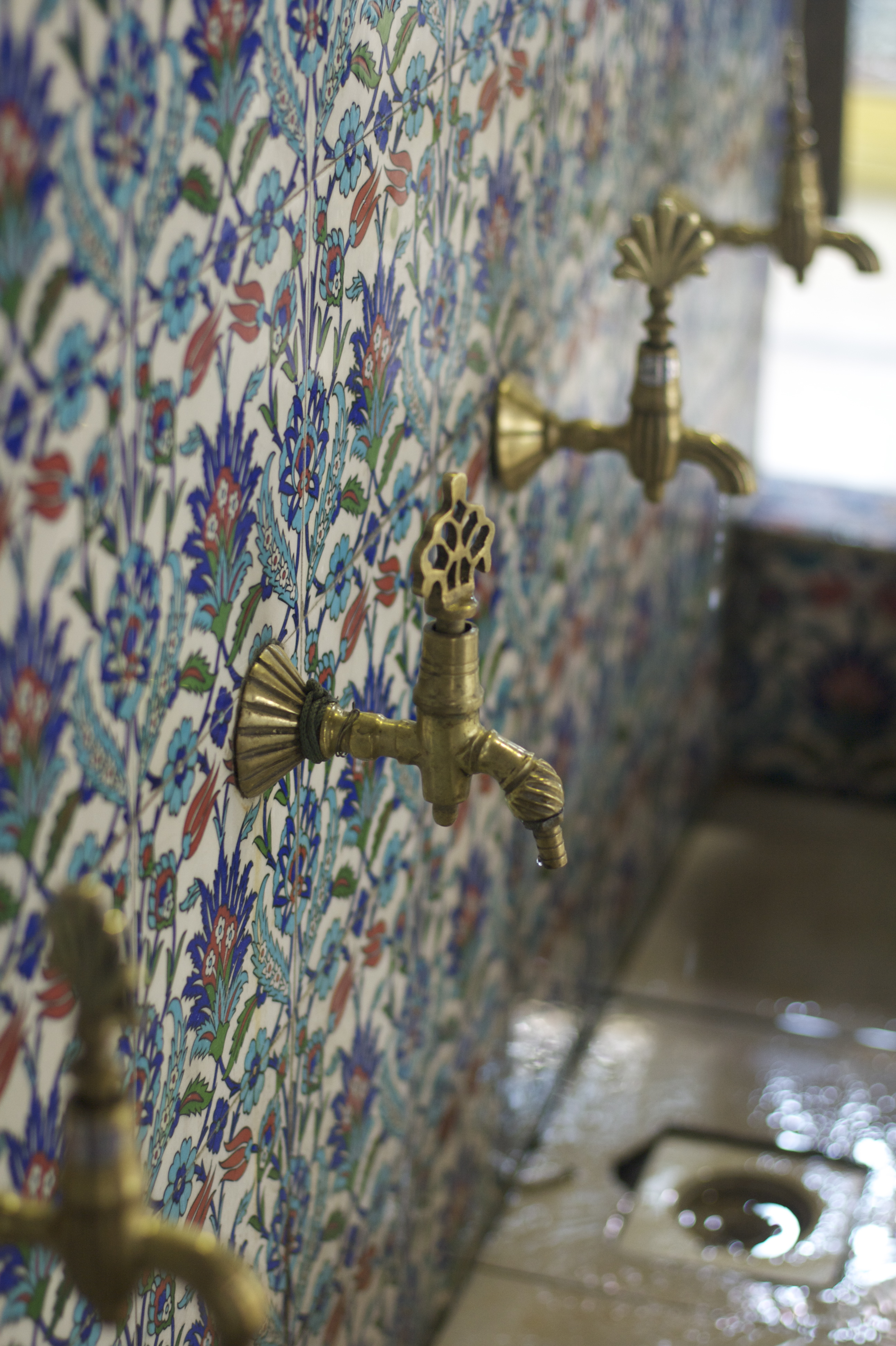
Faucets of a fountain in the bazaar.

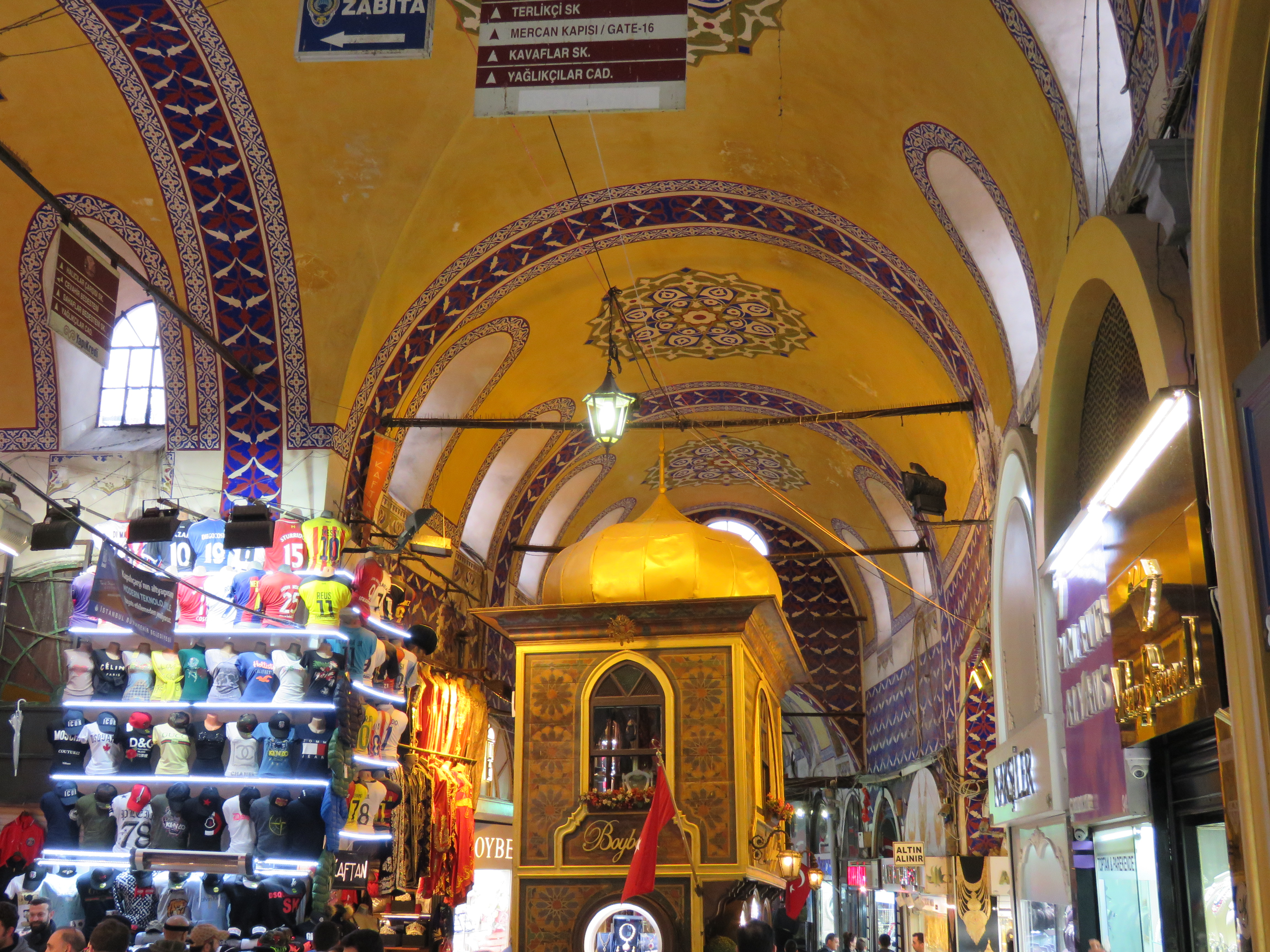
Ornamented ceiling

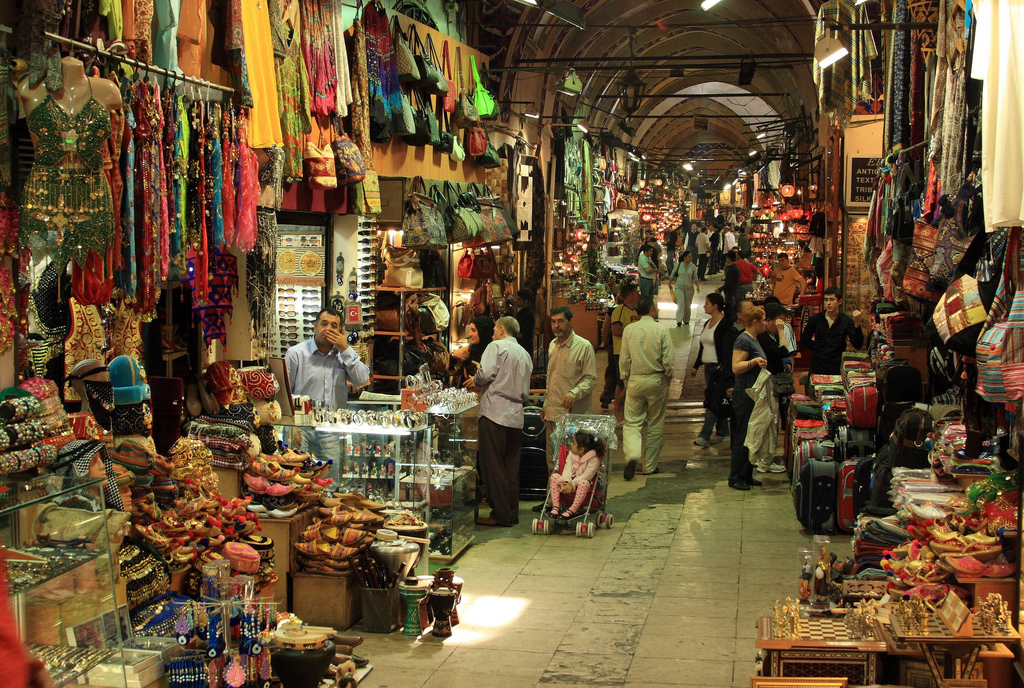
Another interior view from the bazaar.

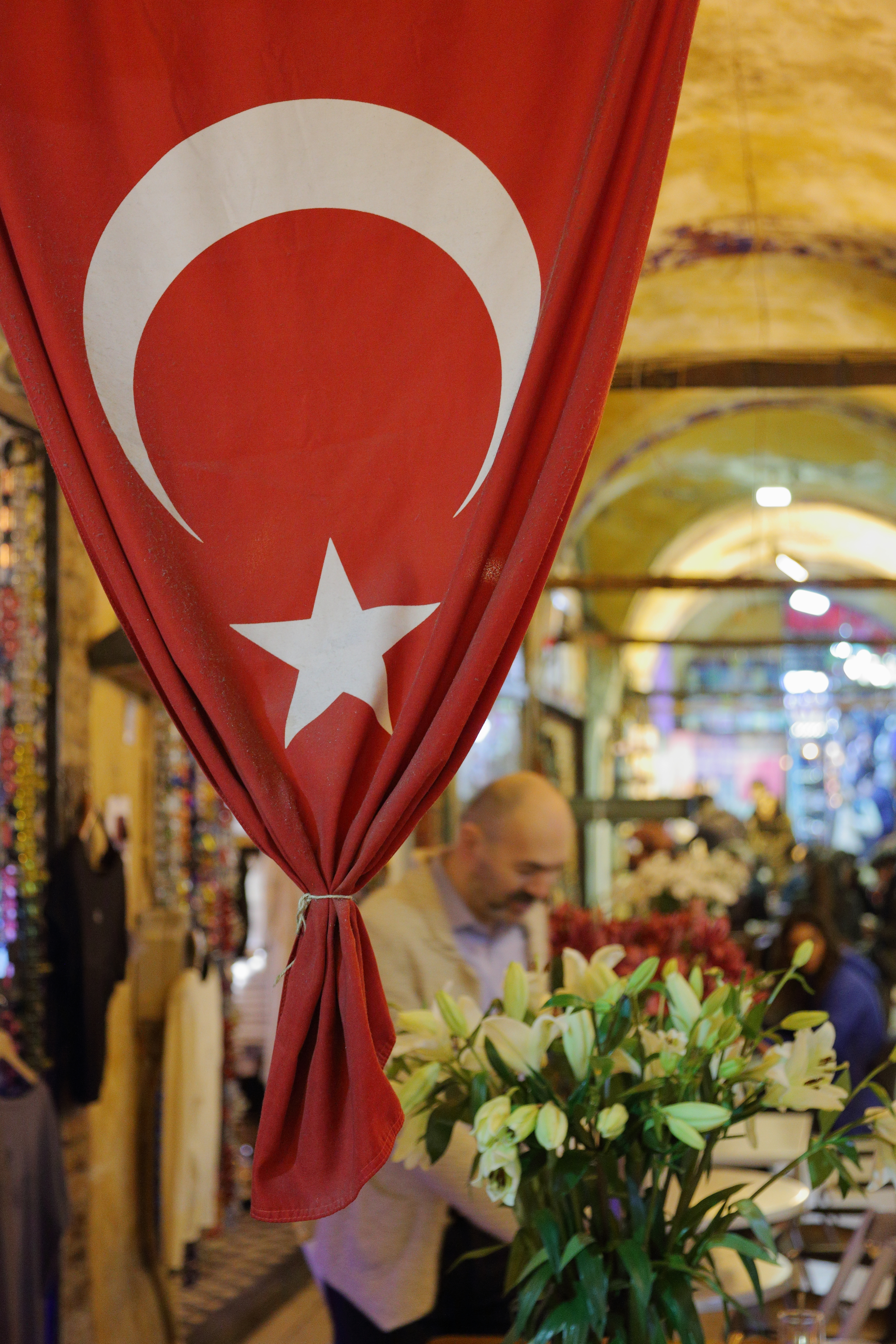
A Turkish flag inside the bazaar.

== See also ==
- Arcade: a covered passageway with stores along one or both sides.
- Bazaar of Tabriz (World's largest covered bazaar)
- Bazaar
- Bazaari
- Covered Market, Oxford, England
- Gold Souq: a market trading in gold.
- List of streets, hans and gates in Grand Bazaar, Istanbul
- List of shopping malls in Istanbul
- Market
- Merchant
- Peddler
- Retail
- Souq

== Sources ==
- Mamboury, Ernest (1953). The Tourists' Istanbul. Istanbul: Çituri Biraderler Basımevi.
- Eyice, Semavi (1955). Istanbul. Petite Guide a travers les Monuments Byzantins et Turcs (in French). Istanbul: Istanbul Matbaası.
- Janin, Raymond (1964). Constantinople Byzantine (in French) (2 ed.). Paris: Institut Français d'Etudes Byzantines.
- Müller-Wiener, Wolfgang (1977). Bildlexikon zur Topographie Istanbuls: Byzantion, Konstantinupolis, Istanbul bis zum Beginn d. 17 Jh (in German). Tübingen: Wasmuth. ISBN 978-3-8030-1022-3.
- Gülersoy, Çelik (1980). Story of the Grand Bazaar. Istanbul: Istanbul Kitaplığı.
- Mantran, Robert (1998). La vita quotidiana a Constantinopoli ai tempi di Solimano il Magnifico e dei suoi successori (XVI e XVII secolo) (in Italian) (3 ed.). Milan: Rizzoli. ISBN 8817165581.
- Hallam, Katie (2009). The Traveler's Atlas: Europe. London: Barron's Educational Series. ISBN 978-0-7641-6176-6.
- Archnet Digital Library – Covered Bazaar
- Turkish Culture Portal – Grand Bazaar in Istanbul
