= List of streets, hans and gates in Grand Bazaar, Istanbul =

The Grand Bazaar in Istanbul has four main gates situated at the ends of its two major streets which intersect near the southwestern corner of the bazaar. One street connects the Bayezid II Mosque and Beyazıt Square with the Nuruosmaniye Mosque. As everywhere in the East, traders of the same type of good were forcibly concentrated along one road, which got its name from their profession. The names of the streets in the Grand Bazaar give us precious information about the goods and the profession in use during the Ottoman Empire.

== Streets, hans and gates ==
Street	Han	Gate
Acıçeşme	Ağa	Beyazıt
Ağa	Alipaşa	Çarşıkapı
Altuncular	Astarcı	Çuhacıhan
Aminçiler	Balyacı	Kuyumcular
Araracıoğlu	Bodrum	Mahmutpaşa
Aynacılar	Cebeci	Nuruosmaniye
Basmacılar	Çukur	Örücüler
Çuhacıhanı	Evliya	Sepetçihan
Bitpazarı	Hatipemin	Takkeciler
Fesçiler	İçcebeci	Tavukpazarı
Ganiçelebi	İmamali	Zenneciler
Hacıhasan	Kalcılar
Hacıhüsnü	Kapılar
Hacımemiş	Kaşıkçı
Halıcılar	Kebapçı
Hazırelbiseciler	Kızlarağası
İplikçiler	Mercan
Kahvehane	Perdahçı
Kalpakçılar	Rabia
Karakol	Safran
Karamanlıoğlu	Sarnıçlı
Kavaflar	Sarraf
Kazazlar	Sepetçi
Keseciler	Sorguçlu
Kilitçiler	Varakçı
Kolancılar	Yağcı
Koltukçu	Yolgeçen
Kürkçüler	Zincirli
Lütfullahefendi
Mercançıkmazı
Muhafazacılar
Mühürdaremin
Ortakazazcılar
Örücülerhamamı
Parçacılar
Perdahçılar
Püskülcüler
Reisoğlu
Ressam
Sahaflarbedesteni
Sandal
Sandalbedesteni
Serpuççular
Sıra odalar
Sipahi
Tacirler
Takkeciler
Tavukpazarı
Terlikçiler
Terzibaşı
Terziler
Tuğcular
Varakçıhan
Yağlıkçılar
Yarımtaşhan
Yeşildirek
Yorgancılar
Yüncühasan
Zenneciler
