= Trolleybuses in Istanbul =

Electric public transport system in Istanbul, Turkey

Istanbul trolleybus system
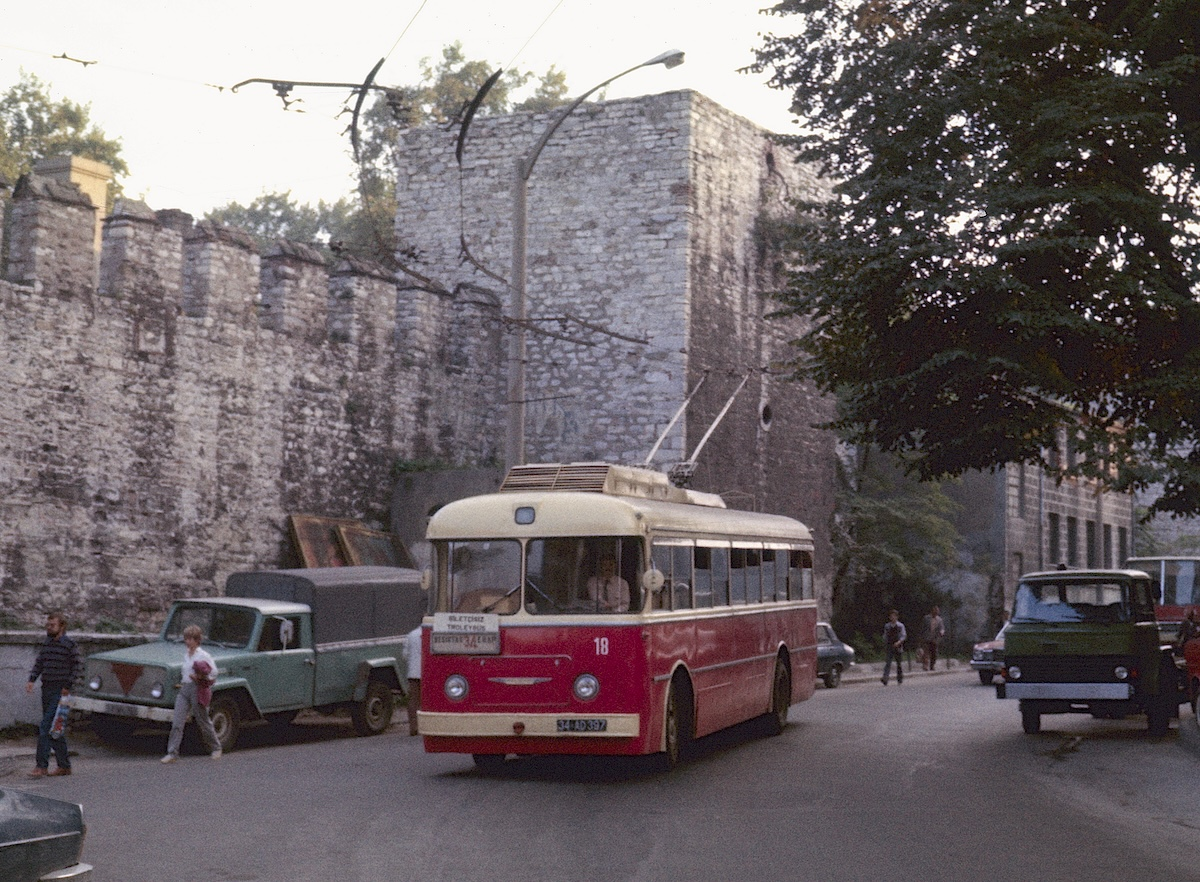
- A trolleybus on Alemdar Caddesi in 1981

Operation
- Locale: Istanbul, Turkey
- Open: 1962
- Close: 1984
- Status: Closed
- Routes: 18
- Operator: IETT

Infrastructure
- Electrification: 600 V DC, parallel overhead lines
- Stock: 101

The Istanbul trolleybus system formed part of the public transport network in the city of Istanbul, Turkey, from 1962 to 1984. Operated by Istanbul Electricity, Tram and Tunnel Establishments (IETT), the system was one of five trolleybus systems to have existed in Turkey, along with ones in Ankara, İzmir, Malayta, and Sanliurfa, but was the only trolleybus system to have been located in the European part of Turkey. It was operated by the IETT for its entire 22-year history. At its maximum extent, the system had 18 routes and was Turkey's largest trolleybus system.

== History ==
Istanbul had been served by electric trams since 1914, and the Istanbul tram network was still extensive in the 1950s. However, the rolling stock had grown quite old and was wearing out, while much of the track was also in need of replacement. These factors along with increasing traffic congestion on the narrow streets served by many tram lines and the desire to expand service into hilly areas where trams would be unable to cope with the steep grades led to a decision to convert the tram network to trolleybuses. The trolleybus system was to be located entirely on the European side of the Bosphorus Strait. The last tram line there closed in 1961, but a few tram lines continued to operate on the Asian side until the final tramway closure in 1966. (Trams began to return to Istanbul in 1990, with a heritage tram line and later a new modern-tram system.)

Construction of the trolleybus system began in 1961, and the first of 100 Alfa Romeo vehicles ordered for the new system were delivered in 1962. The trolleybus system opened in 1962 and was operated by IETT for its entire history. After completion of construction of the new system in 1963, the following 16 trolleybus routes were in operation:

- 22 Eminönü – Bebek
- 23 Taksim – Bebek
- 23A Taksim – Ortaköy
- 23B Taksim – Beşiktaş
- 30 Aksaray – Ortaköy
- 34 Edirnekapı – Beșiktaș
- 50 Tünel – Levend
- 50D Taksim – Levend
- 60 Tünel – Maçka
- 70 Tünel – Kurtuluş
- 83 Topkapı – Taksim
- 85 Edirnekapı – Taksim

and four routes that used different numbers to indicate the direction of travel on a large loop in the city centre:

- K1/K4 Bayazıt – Kurtuluş
- L1/L2 Bayazıt – Levend
- M1/M4 Bayazıt – Maçka
- T1/T4 Bayazıt – Taksim

Trolleybus routes crossed the Golden Horn at two different locations, via the Galata Bridge and also the Atatürk Bridge. Being a moveable bridge, the Galata Bridge required special infrastructure for the overhead wires powering the trolleybuses. On Atatürk Boulevard trolleybuses passed through the arches of the 4th century Valens Aqueduct. Fares were collected by conductors, and this was still the situation in 1975. However, by at least 1982, the fare system had been changed to one in which tickets had to be purchased before boarding and dropped into a farebox next to the driver.

The network was revised several times over the years. In 1968, 13 routes were operating, including two newer routes serving the Sirkeci neighbourhood, 67 and 77. In that same year, operator IETT built a new trolleybus in its own workshops (using the shell of a withdrawn Magirus bus), the 101st trolleybus in its fleet. However, no additional such vehicles were ever built.

Trolleybus operation on all of the routes serving Levend was suspended in 1974, because of major construction, and only nine routes were operating in late 1975. A new route 69A (Şişli – Yenikapı) was introduced by 1974, but by late 1975 it was using motorbuses.

By at least March 1977, the routes serving Levend had been reinstated. A previously unreported route observed using trolleybuses in June 1979 was 87 (Taksim – Şişhane – Edirnekapı).

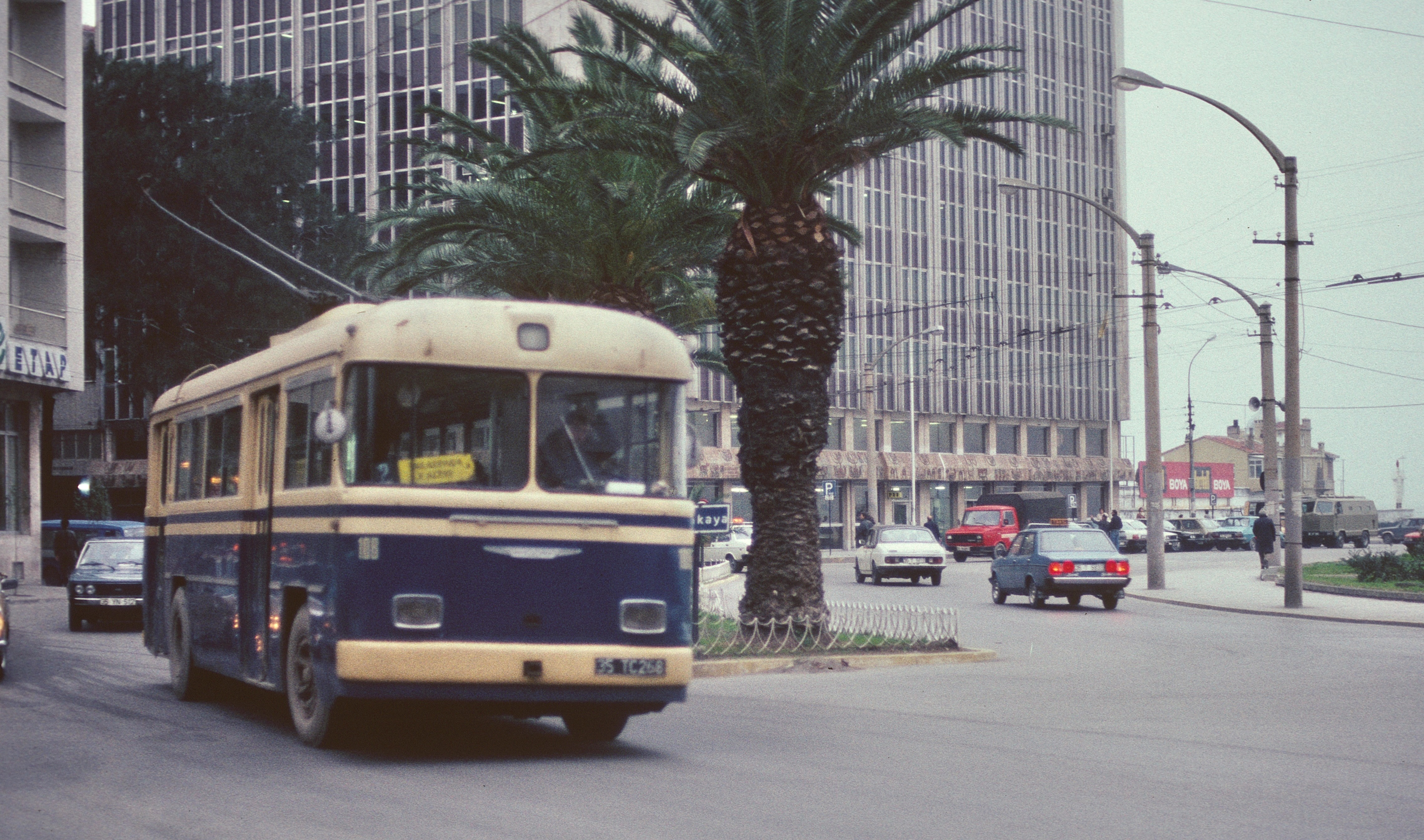
An ex-Istanbul trolleybus in service on the İzmir trolleybus system in 1990

Until about 1980, the fleet had been well maintained, but the vehicles' condition declined significantly in the 1980s.

IETT discontinued all trolleybus service in 1984, sometime during the summer. In the same year, but before the closure, 75 of the 100 trolleybuses were sold to ESHOT, the operator of the İzmir trolleybus system, and eventually were placed in service there. The other 25 continued in service for a brief time, until all trolleybus service was discontinued within the year. By autumn 1984, the entire fleet had been moved from Şişli depot to an army compound in another part of the city.

== Fleet ==
The fleet was composed entirely of 100 Italian-built Alfa Romeo vehicles with bodies by Aerfer, with the exception of one prototype trolleybus built in 1968 by IETT itself. An articulated Alfa Romeo trolleybus built for the Montevideo trolleybus system was tested in 1963, but no order for such vehicles was placed.

Fleet numbers	Quantity	Manufacturer	Electrics	Model no.	Year built	Notes
1–100	100	Alfa Romeo–Aerfer	Ansaldo	910F	1962–1963	
101	1	IETT	BBC–Ansaldo		1968	Built using the shell of a Magirus bus, into which IETT installed BBC electrical equipment and an Ansaldo motor. It was the only trolleybus in the fleet with the front door located ahead of the first axle.

=== Preserved trolleybuses ===
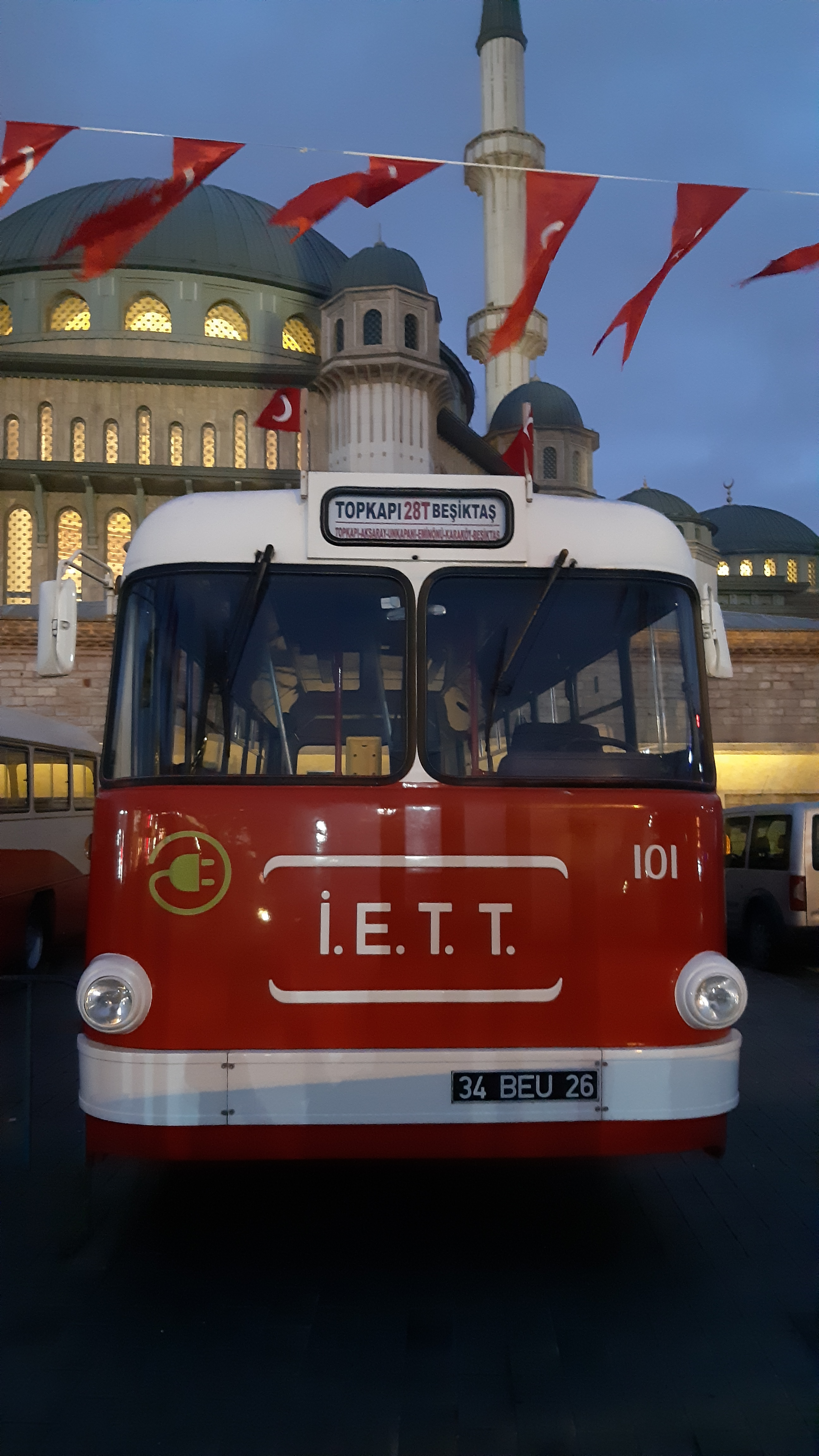
The replica of unique IETT-built trolleybus no. 101

No trolleybuses are known to have been preserved from the Istanbul system, but in 2013 a replica of the former fleet's unique IETT-built trolleybus 101 was constructed. It was fitted with replica trolley poles, for an authentic appearance, but is powered by a diesel engine.

== Depots ==
The trolleybus fleet was based at two depots: One in Şişli, a former tram depot, and the other in Topkapı, on Millet Street.

== See also ==
- List of trolleybus systems
- Public transport in Istanbul
