= Trams in Istanbul =

Trams in Istanbul could refer to:

- Trams in Istanbul (1871-1966), the first-generation historical tram system in Istanbul.
- Istanbul Tram, the second-generation of tram system, opened in 1992
- Istanbul nostalgic tramways, two heritage tramlines.
