= Trams in Istanbul (1871-1966) =

Tram system in Istanbul, Turkey

Operation
- Locale: Istanbul, Turkey
- Status: Closed (first generation); Operational (modern system)

Statistics
Horsecar era: 1860–1912
- Status: Converted to electricity
- Propulsion system: Horses
Electric tram era: 1912–1966
- Status: Closed
Modern & Heritage tram era: 1992 & 1990
- Status: Operational
- Lines: 2 (modern tramlines); 2 (heritage tramlimes, 1000 mm track gauge)
- Owner: İETT
- Operator: Metro Istanbul
- Track gauge: 1,435 mm (4 ft 8 1/2 in) standard gauge
- Propulsion system: Electric
- Depots: Taksim, Zeytinburnu, Şehremini, Kadıköy
- Stock: Bombardier Flexity Swift; Stadbahn-B (ex-Cologne); Alstom Citadis X-04
Overview

The former capital of the Ottoman Empire, Istanbul, was once served on both its Asian and European sides by a large network of trams in Istanbul. Its first-generation tram network first operated as a horse tram system starting in 1871, and was eventually converted to electric trams in the early twentieth century. The original tram network finally closed in 1966.

Trams returned in 1990, and a second generation of modern tram service began service in 1992. In this modern era, Istanbul is served by three separate tramway systems. The Asian side has a heritage tramline, whereas the European side has both a heritage tramline and a modern tram system.

== History ==
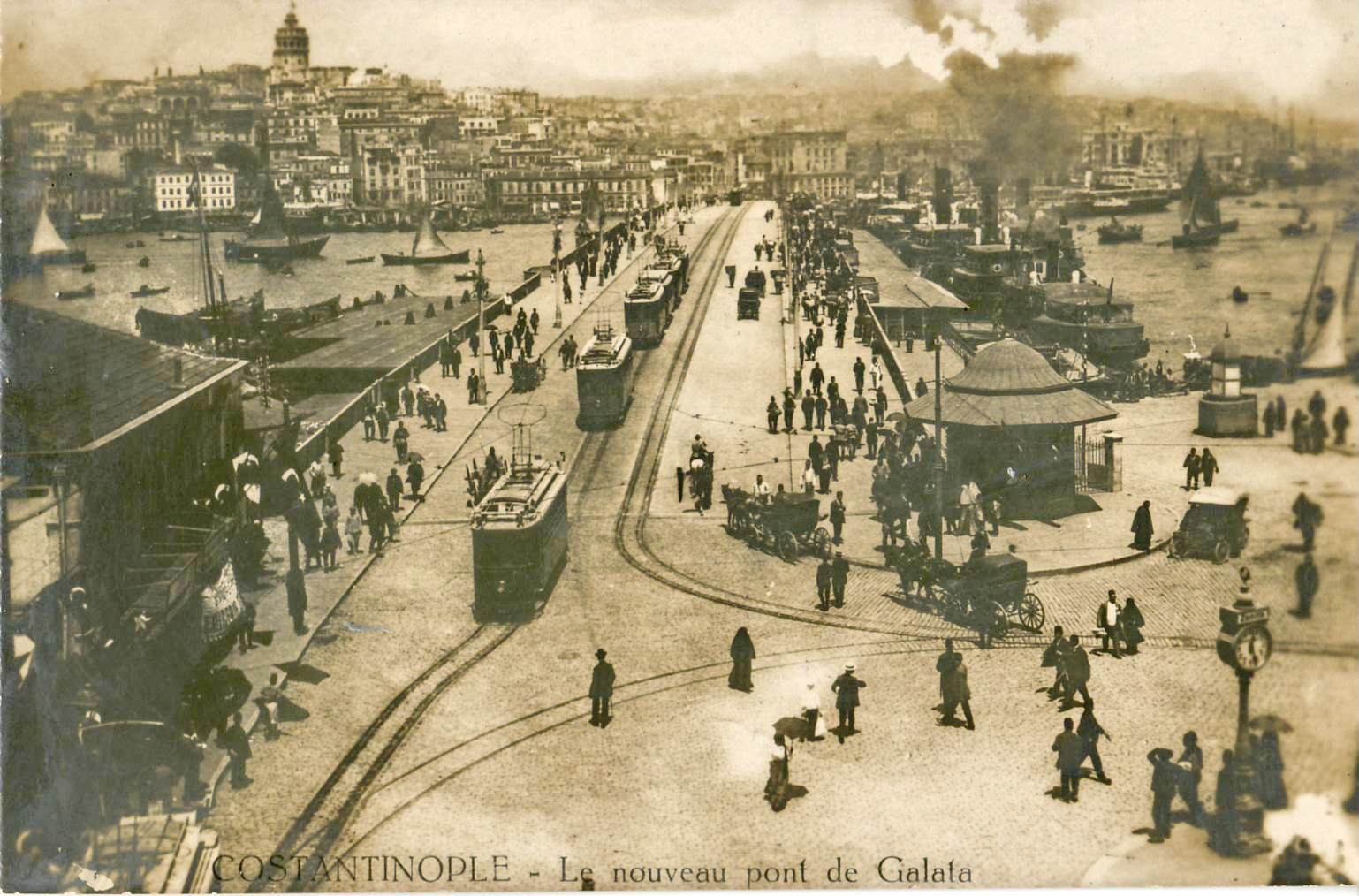
Trams on the new Galata Bridge (c.1912).

Istanbul inaugurated horse trams in 1871 and these served the people of Istanbul until 1912. Following this date, electric trams were put in place and they were the main means for urban public transport until 1966. Many additional tramlines were added over time, and the system reached its greatest extent in 1956 with 108 million passengers carried by 270 tram-cars on 56 tram lines. But starting from the mid-1950s, automobile traffic congestion in Istanbul increased rapidly. Bus and taxi services grew rapidly over the same period of time. The number of private cars also increased greatly, and many narrow streets, which were ideal for trams, now started filling up with motor vehicles. Tramcars were not modernized for many decades, and some of the 1911 electric cars were still running in the 1960s. At that time, modern buses provided faster and smoother journeys, whereas the trams were slower, narrow single-coach cars and had many outdated features like bow collectors. Poor maintenance of tracks caused derailments and bumpy rides. Due to the city's rapid growth, reconstruction of Istanbul's infrastructure became urgent, and many streets were widened. The transport authority thought that slow tram transport sharing road space with fast bus transport would cause many problems in trying to guarantee smoother city transportation. In sum, the tramway had little comfort and was slow because it was caught in the traffic jam caused by the cars, and the tracks were also outdated, noisy and in the middle of the street. Cars had to pass the tramway on the right, causing danger for the pedestrians boarding and alighting the tramway. Comparatively, electric trolleybuses had proved to be a good alternative to trams in many countries. Due to all of these factors, the transport department decide to replace trams with trolleybuses in Istanbul.

The trolleybus system started out well, but due to the vehicles' needed continuous high investment and maintenance, they were not affordable to the transport authority either, and trolleybus service survived only 22 years.

After closing the tram network in mid-1960s, it was believed that by removing the old-fashioned obstacle to smooth city traveling, the city would be able to move faster than before, but this belief was proven to be false in the following years. The uncontrolled increase in petrol-based vehicles like buses, taxis, and private cars began to choke the streets of Istanbul. For being situated mostly in Asia, Turkey suffered by many problems common to developing countries, including pollution, traffic jams, illegal migration, low literacy and increasing population, etc. Increasing population led to the increasing urbanization of Istanbul, which spawned increasing motor vehicles, increasing air and noise pollution, and increasing traffic jams and smog. The city eventually became slower than pre-tram closure era. From 1970 onwards, all this problems grew rapidly, and by the mid-1980s people of Istanbul realized that the failure to control motor vehicles, and the closure of tram network, was a great mistake. Many cities around the world like Tunis, Buenos Aires, etc., also realized this error and, like them, Istanbul also planned for the return of the tram.

As an experiment, Istanbul first opened a heritage tramline at European side in 1990. Due to its increasing popularity, a modern tramline was opened in 1992, also at European side. Another heritage tramline opened in 2003 but this time on the Asian side, and another modern tramline opened in 2007.

=== Timeline ===
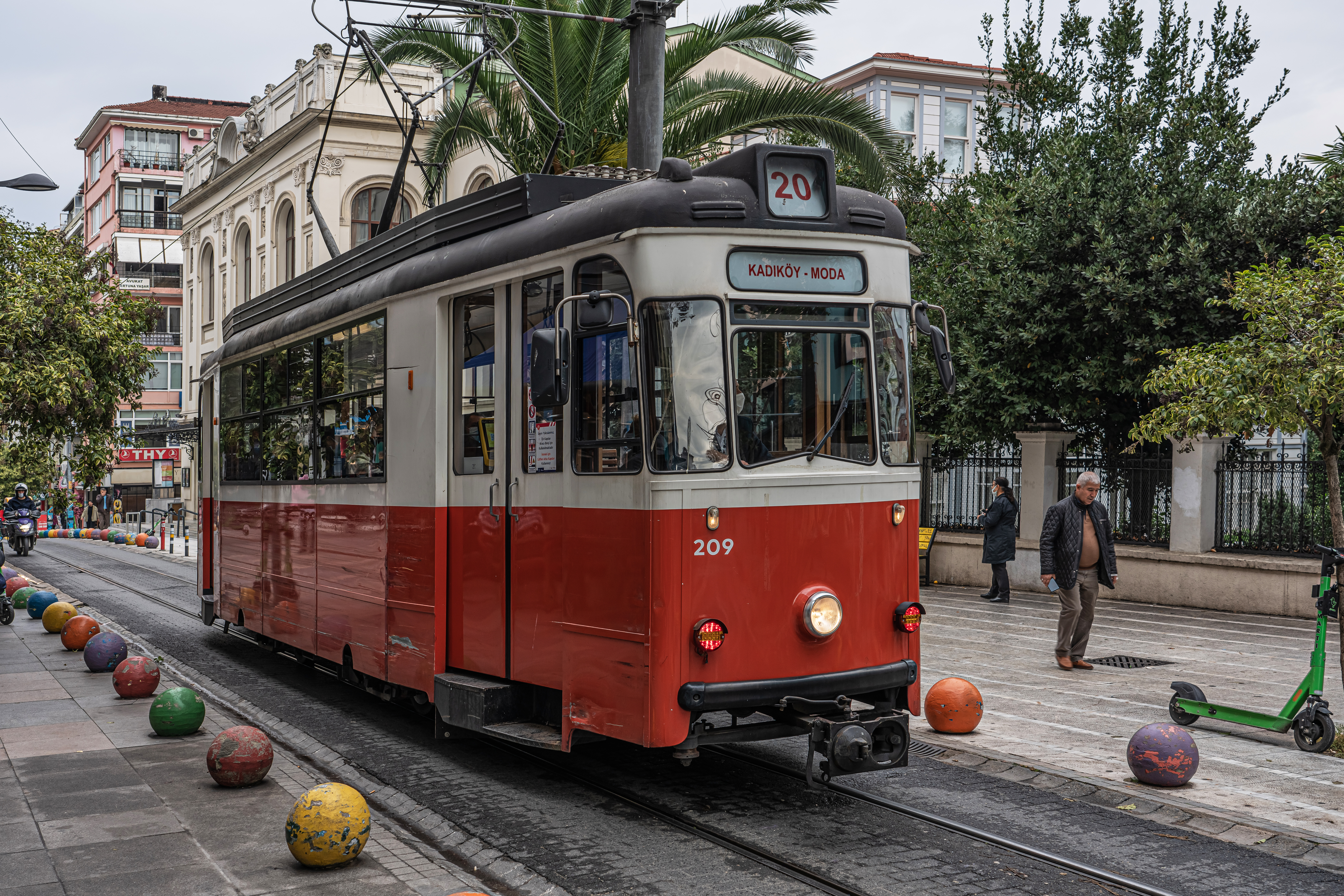
Heritage tram in Asian side

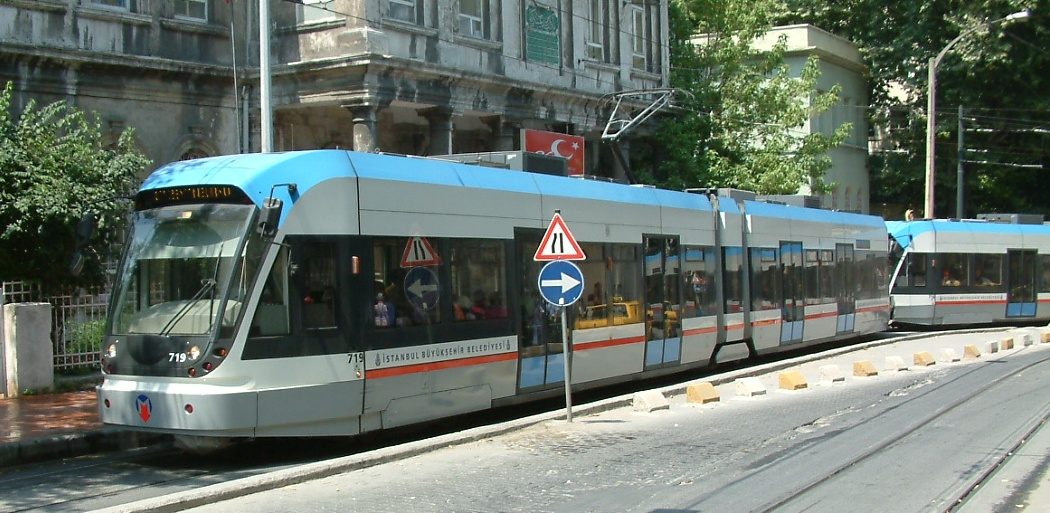
Modern tram in Istanbul

- 1860 – The operation of a horse-drawn tram system in Istanbul was proposed.
- 1863 – The first bid for the construction of a tramway along Istanbul's main arterials in the suburbs came from a person named Huchiadson.
- 1864 – The second proposal in 1864 in Istanbul and the Galata Beşiktaş' privilege to operate a tram. Three routes were planned: 1) Eminönü – Divanyolu – Beyazıt – Aksaray – Yedikule or Topkapı; 2) Eminönü – Ayvansaray – Eyüp; and 3) Galata – Karaköy – Tophane – Beşiktaş – Ortaköy – Arnavutköy
- 1871 – The operation of the first horse-drawn tramcars started, on four lines.
- 1872 – Increased passenger demand because of the early 1890s the first route with the "Imperial" cars started, called for the use of double-decker trams.
- 1912 – Horse tram operation ceased.
- 1914 – Electric trams started running from 25 January on the European side. The route was from Karaköy to Eminönü. It was also the first tram line to pass over Galata Bridge, as the passage of horse-drawn trams was not permitted on that bridge.
- 1923 – Tram service was expanded to 12 routes.
- 1928 – Electric trams started running from 8 June on the Asian side.
- 1939 – The tramcar, Tünel, bus and electricity systems, which were being operated by various foreign companies, were nationalized, and a new company called the İstanbul Elektrik, Tramway ve Tünel İşletmeleri (İETT) took over both the European and the Asian networks.
- 1950 – Tram service expanded to 37 routes. All of the lines crossed the Golden Horn via the Galata Bridge, which served as the central connection point. This was the peak year of Istanbul tramway operation.
- 1956 – The Tünel-Maçka line (route 14), in the European part of the city, and the route from Topkapı-Çapa line, in the in-town walls region, were closed. The Topkapı – Çapa – Aksaray route was also closed, for redevelopment of Aksaray Square.
- 1961 – The last tram ran on the European side of Istanbul on 12 June 1961, on Line 17 Şişli - Karaköy. The Topkapı-Eminönü line was replaced by trolleybuses on 27 May 1961. Six trams were transferred to the tram network on the Asian side.
- 1966 – The last tram ran on the Asian side of Istanbul on 14 November 1966, between Line 12 Kadıköy and Üsküdar. The remaining trams were transferred to the transport museum.
- 1984 – Trolleybus service stopped on 16 July 1984. At this time, all electrically powered city transport in Istanbul ended completely.
- 1990 – İstiklal Caddesi (Independence Avenue) was closed to traffic. Trams returned to the European side of Istanbul as a heritage tram line, the Taksim-Tünel Nostalgia Tramway, operating on İstiklal Caddesi between Taksim and Tünel. The rolling stock was the same as the pre-1966 trams.
- 1992 – Opening of a completely separate tramline: Trams returned to the European side of Istanbul as a modern system (using modern cars), built by Yapı Merkezi. The line, now called the T1 line, operates on the same alignment where trams last ran in 1956.
- 2003 – Trams returned to the Asian side of Istanbul as a heritage tramway, operating on a circular tramway on the old closed Route 20 tramway. The rolling stock comprised mostly Gotha-type two-axle cars built in the 1950s and 1960s and imported secondhand from several cities in eastern Germany. This line is now known as the T3 tramline (or the Kadıköy-Moda Nostalgia Tramway).
- 2007 – A second modern tramline, called T4, opened on the European side on 12 September 2007.
- 2021 – The first tram line in Turkey without overhead wire called the T5 started operating between Eminönü and Alibeyköy Coach Station on 1 January 2021.
- 2024 – U3/T6 was opened between Kazlıçeşme and Sirkeci, it is a commuter line and uses the same stations as the Istanbul Suburban from Kazlıçeşme to Sirkeci. It is designated as T6 on maps created by the Metro Istanbul Authority and as U3 by the Ministry of Transportation.

== Tramlines ==
=== Historic tram routes ===
There were many tram routes; the European side had more routes than the Asian side. The main routes were as follows:

- 1 – Kadıköy – Kısıklı
- 4 – Kadıköy – Bostancı
- 6 – Kadıköy – Fenerbahçe
- 8 – Kadıköy – Hasanpaşa
- 10 – Şişli – Tünel
- 11 – Şişli – Beyazıt (European Side)
- 11 – Üsküdar – Kısıklı (Asian Side)
- 12 – Harbiye – Fatih (European Side)
- 12 – Kadıköy – Üsküdar (Asian Side)
- 14 – Maçka – Tünel
- 15 – Maçka – Sirkeci
- 16 – Maçka – Beyazıt
- 17 – Mecidiyeköy – Şişli – Sirkeci (Mid - 1955 Last Stop Karaköy)
- 19 – Kurtuluş- Aksaray
- 20 – Kadıköy – Moda (This route has been partly replicated by the Asian side heritage tram from 2003)(Going the same way)
- 22 – Bebek – Eminönü
- 23 – Ortaköy – Aksaray
- 32 – Topkapı – Bahçekapı
- 33 – Yedikule – Bahçekapı
- 34 – Beşiktaş – Fatih
- 37 – Edirnekapı – Bahçekapı

Beside these, there were some short routes, which were truncated versions of full routes.

Route numbers were also displayed by color combinations, mainly for the illiterate. The colors reflected the termini as follows:

- Red : Aksaray, Mecidiyeköy, Şişli, Topkapı, Tünel
- Blue : Beyazıt, Maçka
- Green : Edirnekapı, Fatih, Harbiye
- Yellow : Arnavutköy, Bebek, Beşiktaş, Kurtuluş, Ortaköy
- White : Bahçekapı, Eminönü, Sirkeci, Taksim, Yedikule

The colors of both termini were used in left and right of destination board. (Note: service 22 had all-yellow as color despite serving Eminönü)

On the Asian side, services had solid colors:

- Red : 4, 11
- Blue : 1
- Green : 6
- Yellow : 20
- White : 12
- Brown : 8

=== Alignments ===
All tram routes were on unreserved tracks and middle of the roads. Some routes were on narrow streets, some were on broad avenues. Tramcars were caught in the traffic jam caused by the cars. The tracks were also outdated, noisy and in the middle of the street. Cars had to pass the tramway on the right, causing danger for the pedestrians boarding and alighting the tramway. Those were one of the strong reasons of closure of the system.

There are some common alignments with past & present tramway system:

- The heritage tram of European side from Taksim to Tünel has laid following the previous systems – route 10, 11, 15, 17, but now as a single track with crossing.
- The heritage tram of Asian side from Kadıköy to Moda has laid following the previous systems route 20, but as a circular tramway.
- The modern tram from Kabataş to Zeytinburnu has laid following the previous systems alignment, as Kabataş – Karaköy – Sirkeci – Beyazıt – Aksaray – Topkapı route, with crossing on Galata Bridge.

== Rolling Stock ==
The rolling stock was identical with Istanbul's current European-side heritage tramway. However, the tram was infrequently upgraded, and the 1911 electric cars were still running in the 1960s. These vehicles looked outdated compared to the new cars and buses that were now on the streets, contributing to the tramway's closure. Rolling stock differed between the European and Asian sides, but after the European network closed, trams from the European side were transferred to the Asian side, where they served along with other former trams until the final closure in 1966.

== Depots & termini ==
The following termini were – Kadıköy, Kısıklı, Bostancı, Fenerbahçe, Tünel, Beyazıt, Harbiye, Fatih, Maçka, Sirkeci, Kurtuluş, Moda, Bebek, Eminönü, Ortaköy, Topkapı, Bahçekapı, Yedikule, Edirnekapı, Kabataş.

The following depots were – Bağlarbaşı, Hasanpaşa, Aksaray, Beşiktaş, Şişli

Tünel, Moda & Kadıköy are the three places where both past system's & today's nostalgic system's termini are present. Although there are no stretch of previous termini, and the current termini were built after complete redesignment of Tünel, Moda, Kadıköy area.

== See also ==
- Istanbul Tram – The four modern tramlines in Istanbul
- Istanbul Metro
- Istanbul LRT – Istanbul Metro M1 line
- Istanbul suburban – suburban/commuter rail line
- Public transport in Istanbul – includes information on trams
- Istanbul nostalgic tramways - heritage trams
