= Fenerbahçe (disambiguation) =

Fenerbahçe S.K. is a Turkish multi-sport club.

Fenerbahçe may also refer to:

- Fenerbahçe, Kadıköy, a neighbourhood in Istanbul Province, Turkey
- Fenerbahce (fish), a genus of African fish named in honor of Fenerbahçe S.K.
- Fenerbahçe University, a private university in Istanbul
