= Trolleybuses in İzmir =

İzmir trolleybus system
- A Fiat trolleybus at Alsancak railway station, ending a trip on route 2 in 1990

Operation
- Locale: İzmir, Turkey
- Open: August 16, 1954
- Close: September 1992
- Status: Closed
- Routes: 10
- Operator: ESHOT

Infrastructure
- Electrification: 600 V DC, parallel overhead lines
- Stock: 116 (63 new; 73 used); 90 at maximum

The İzmir trolleybus system formed part of the public transport network in the city of İzmir, Turkey, from 1954 to 1992. Operated by ESHOT, the system was one of five trolleybus systems to have existed in Turkey, along with ones in Ankara, Istanbul, Malatya, and Sanliurfa. Prior to the opening of the Malatya system, in 2015, the İzmir system had been the last surviving trolleybus system in Turkey at the time of its closure in 1992. Trolleybuses operated mainly in Konak, with lines to Buca, Balçova and Tepecik.

== History ==
Trolleybuses replaced the declining tramways of İzmir. The first trolleybuses, built by MAN, arrived in İzmir on May 14, 1954, on a ship from Germany. The first trolleybus line opened on July 28, 1954, or August 16, 1954, between Konak and Güzelyalı. The original fleet totalled eighteen vehicles, MAN trolleybuses (model MKE 3) with Rathgeber bodies, numbered 1–18. The fleet was expanded in 1957 with a purchase of 20 Fiat 2411F trolleybuses, numbered 19–38. One additional Fiat 2411F was purchased in 1962 and numbered 43.

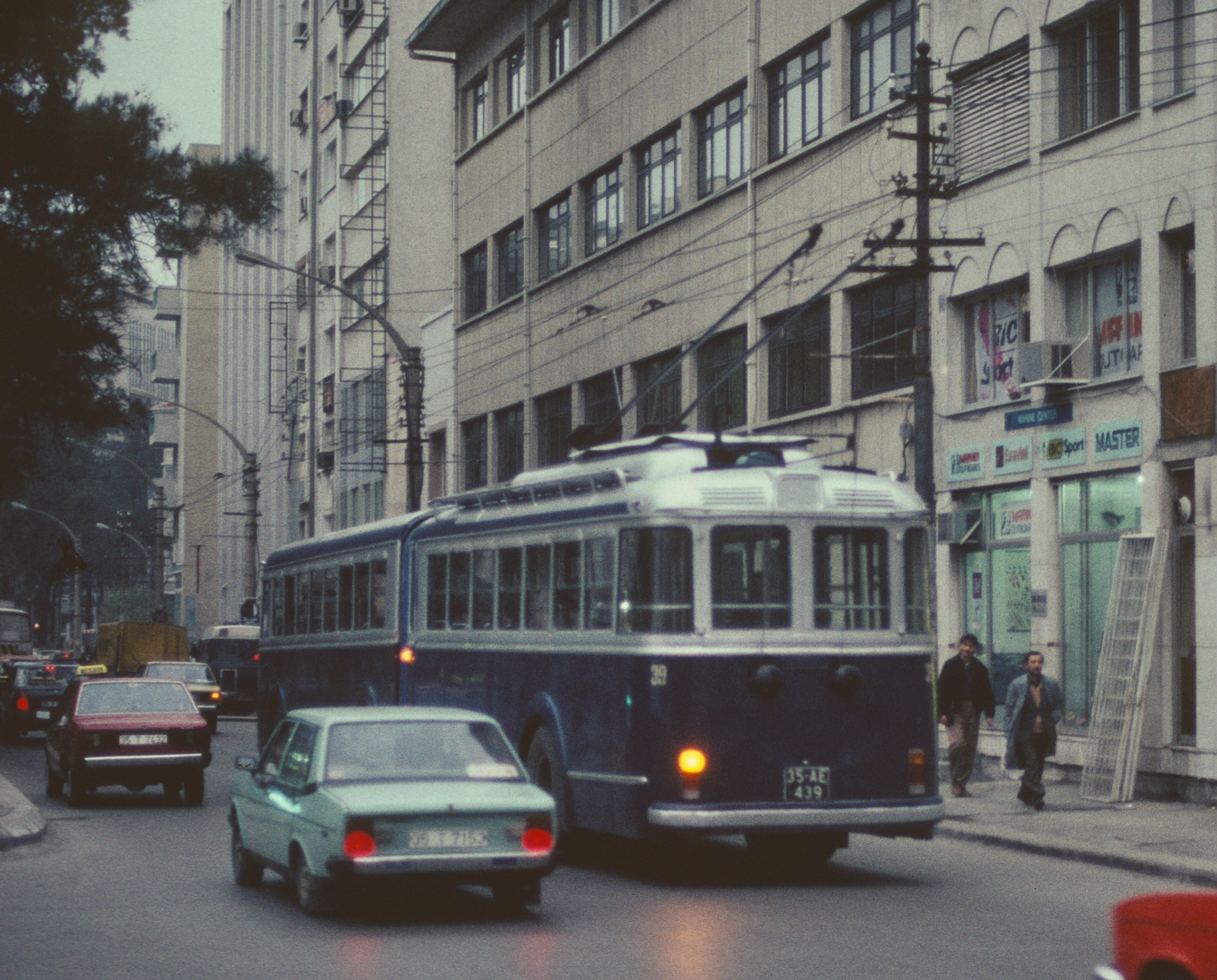
One of the three articulated trolleybuses

The İzmir system was the only Turkish trolleybus system ever to use articulated trolleybuses (until the opening of a new system in Malatya in 2015), but it had only three such vehicles, total. They were built by Fiat/Viberti in 1958 and were numbered 39–41. ESHOT never acquired any more articulated trolleybuses. In the 1960s, the high cost of importing new trolleybuses led the company to convert a batch of Büssing motorbuses into trolleybuses. There were three such conversions in 1962, numbered 42 and 44–45, and 18 more in 1968, numbered 46–63.

After the closure of the Istanbul trolleybus system, in 1984, İzmir acquired most of its trolleybuses. These were built in 1962 by Alfa Romeo-Fiat, and a total of 75 were acquired secondhand from Istanbul. This was the last fleet of trolleybuses to enter service in İzmir. As of mid-1989, the active trolleybus fleet included 19 of the 1957 Fiat 2411F vehicles, all three of the 1958 Viberti-bodied Fiat articulated vehicles, one 1959 Fiat 2411F (No. 43), and 67 ex-Istanbul Alfa Romeo-Fiat vehicles built in 1962. The last of the MAN trolleybuses that opened the system were retired in 1987 and the last Büssing vehicles in 1988 or 1989.

Route 3 was withdrawn on June 9, 1989, leaving four routes still operating: 1, 2, 70 and 80.

ESHOT discontinued trolleybus service in 1992. On March 6, the newspaper Yeni Asır reported that the trolleybus system would be closing in about two months, with removal of the overhead wires completed in "perhaps" three to five months. Visitors in April 1992 found trolleybus service operating at a much-reduced level, with just a few vehicles on route 80 and two articulated trolleybuses on route 1. The final closure came in September 1992.

One Izmir trolleybus has been preserved, a 1960 Alfa Romeo 910F numbered either 93 or 114.

== Routes ==
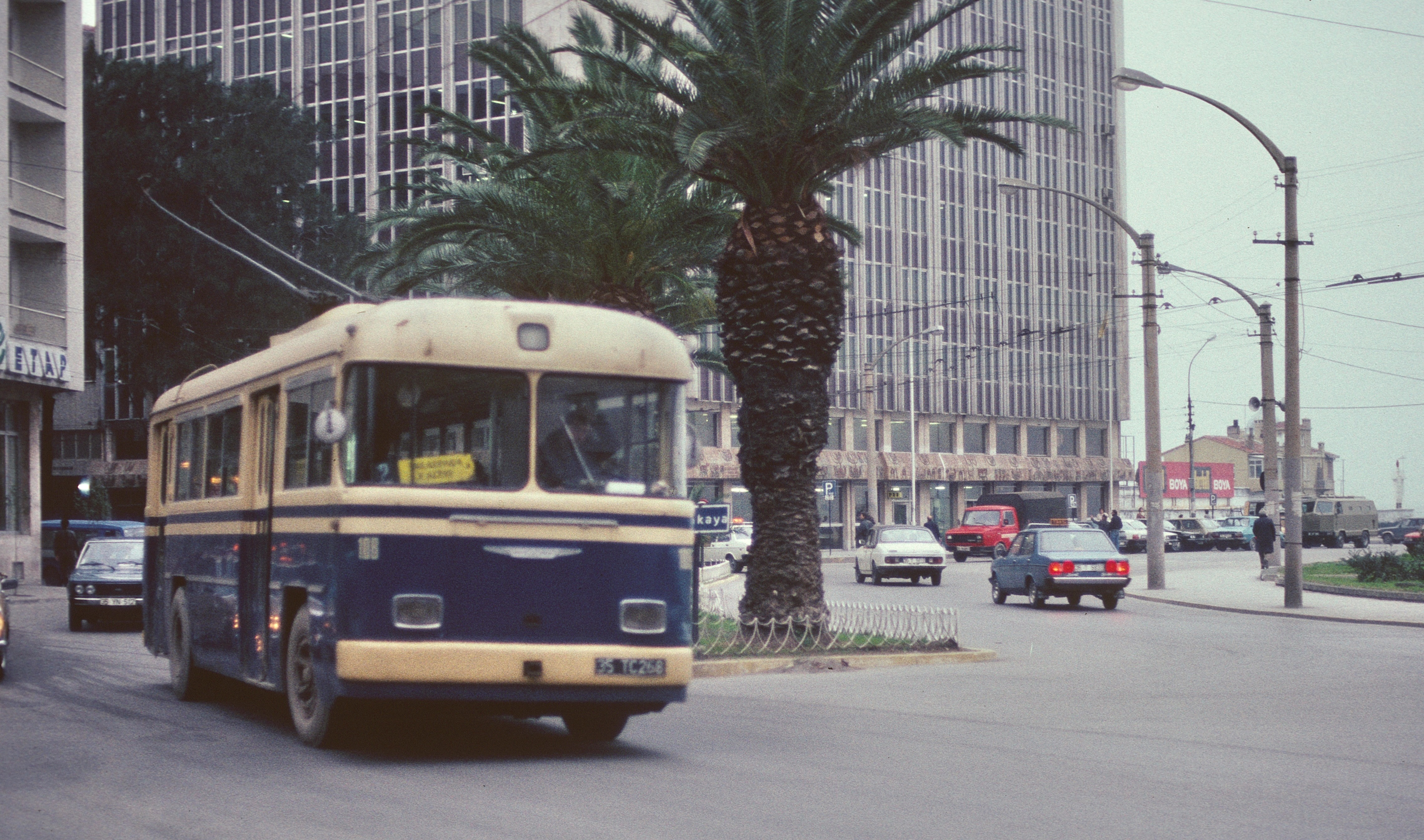
Alfa Romeo trolleybus 108, ex-Istanbul, at Cumhuriyet Square, on route 2 in 1990

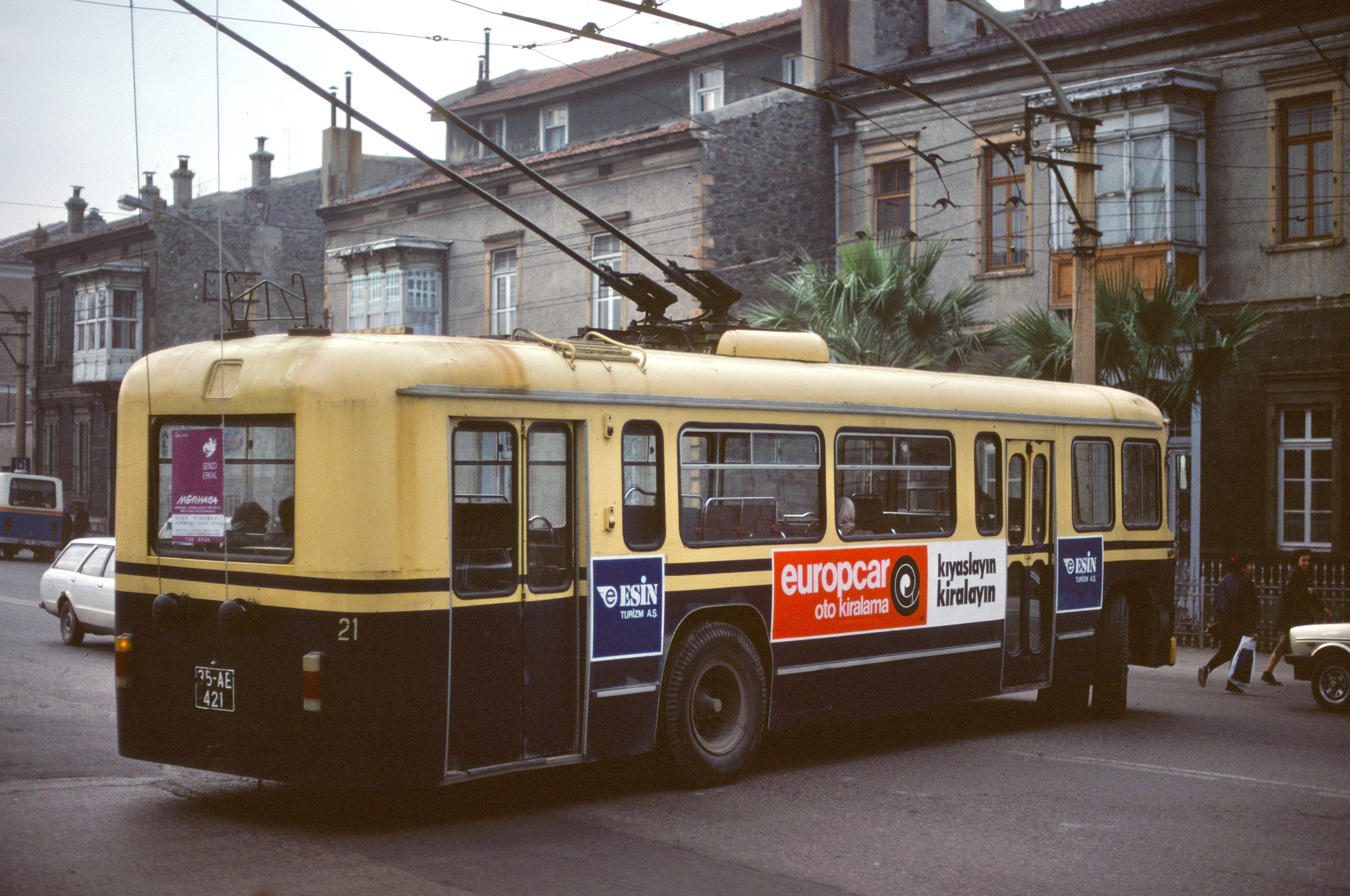
Fiat no. 21 turning at Alsancak terminus

In the system's early years, the following four routes were operated:

- 10 Fahrettin Altay – Konak
- 11 Fahrettin Altay – Konak – Alsancak
- 30 Fahrettin Altay – Tepecik
- 40 Fahrettin Altay – Kahramanlar – Alsancak

In 1985, all routes were renumbered, and six trolleybus routes were in operation:

- 1 Fahrettin Altay – Konak (ex-10)
- 2 Fahrettin Altay – Konak – Alsancak (ex-11)
- 3 Fahrettin Altay – Kahramanlar – Alsancak (ex-40)
- 4 Fahrettin Altay – Tepecik (ex-30)
- 80 Fahrettin Altay – Hatay – Montreux (or Montrö) (ex-50)
- an unnumbered route, Buca – Montreux.

== See also ==
- List of trolleybus systems
- Transport in İzmir
