= Istanbul Tram =

Tram system in Istanbul, Turkey

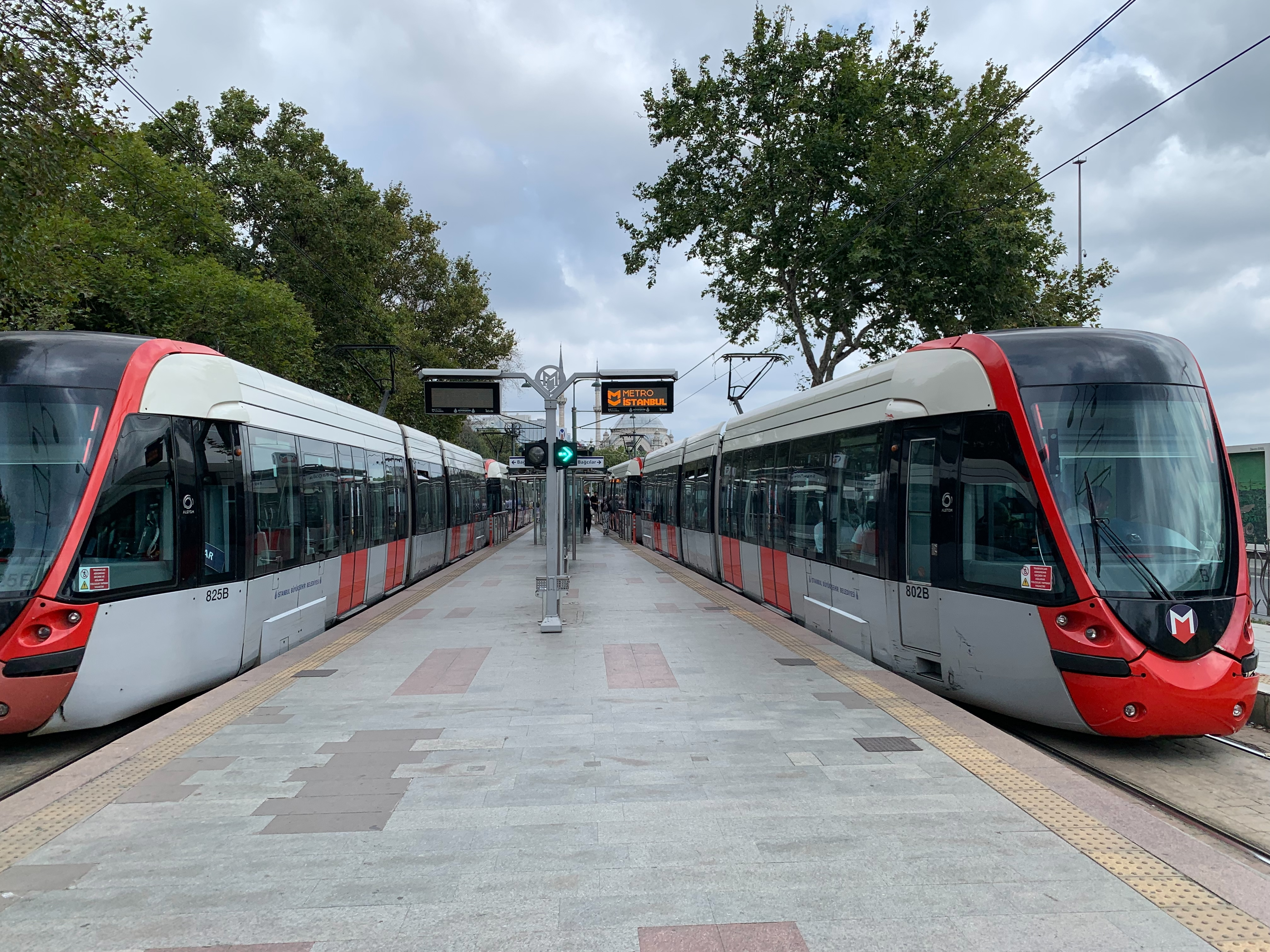

Overview
- Owner: Istanbul Metropolitan Municipality
- Transit type: Tram
- Number of lines: 4 (T1, T4, T5 & T6)
- Number of stations: T1: 31; T4: 22; T5: 14; T6: 8
- Daily ridership: T1: 320,000; T4: 95,000
- Website: Tram

Operation
- Began operation: T1: 13 June 1992; T4: 12 September 2007; T5: 4 January 2021; T6: 26 February 2024
- Operators: Metro Istanbul (T1, T4, T5, T6)
- Number of vehicles: T1: 92; T4: 78
- Train length: T1: 59 m (194 ft)

Technical
- System length: 44.7 km (27.8 mi) (total); T1: 19.3 km (12.0 mi); T4: 15.3 km (9.5 mi); T5: 10.1 km (6.3 mi); T6: 8.394 km (5.216 mi)
- Track gauge: 1,435 mm (4 ft 8 1/2 in) standard gauge
- Electrification: 750 V DC Overhead line Alstom APS (T5 line only)

The Istanbul Tram (Turkish: İstanbul Tramvayı) is a modern tram system on the European side of Istanbul. The first section, the T1 opened in 1992, followed by the T2, which opened in 2006. In 2011, the T1 and T2 merged, with the line retaining the T1 name. The T4, T5 and the T6 lines followed, opening in 2007, 2021 and 2024 respectively.

== History ==
Istanbul, the former capital of the Ottoman Empire, once had a large tramway network on both the Asian and the European sides. It first started as a horse tram in 1871, and was gradually converted to an electric tram system starting in 1912. Many additional routes were added to the tram system, in progressive stages over time. The network reached its most widespread extent in 1956 with 108 million passengers being carried by 270 tram-cars, on 56 lines. However reflecting developments in many cities around the world during the 1960s, the tram service began to be closed down in 1956, and was completely stopped in 1966.

After closing the old tram network in the mid-1960s, the people of Istanbul thought the unfashionable obstacle to smooth city travelling had been removed, and that city traffic would move faster than before, but it proved false some years later. An uncontrolled increase in the use of fossil fuel vehicles like buses, taxi, and private cars started choking the streets of Istanbul. Turkey suffered many of the problems of developing countries, including pollution, traffic jams, illegal migration, low literacy and high levels of population increase etc. As the Population density grew, Istanbul became increasingly urbanized, leading to growing numbers of motor vehicles. This in turn led to increased air and sound pollution, traffic congestion and smog. The city became slower than had been the case prior to the closure of the former tramway system. These problems became apparent in the early '70s; during the mid '80s Istanbulites realized that uncontrolled motor vehicles access and the termination of the tram system had been a mistake. The increase in traffic, congestion and resulting air pollution led to Istanbul becoming one of the most polluted Eurasian cities during the mid '80s. After realising this error, Istanbul planned for the return of trams.

Understanding the great mistake of former tram closure, the government started to decrease pollution as soon as possible, and also recover the good image of Istanbul for tourists. Istanbul's transport authority decided to open a separate, modern, high speed tram.

The modern tramway, called the T1 line, was introduced in Istanbul in 1992, and soon became popular. The T1 tramway has gradually been extended since that time, the last extension being in 2011.

A second modern tramway between Edirnekapı and Mescid-i Selam, called the T4 line, was opened in 2007. The line was extended to Topkapı in 2009.

=== Timeline ===
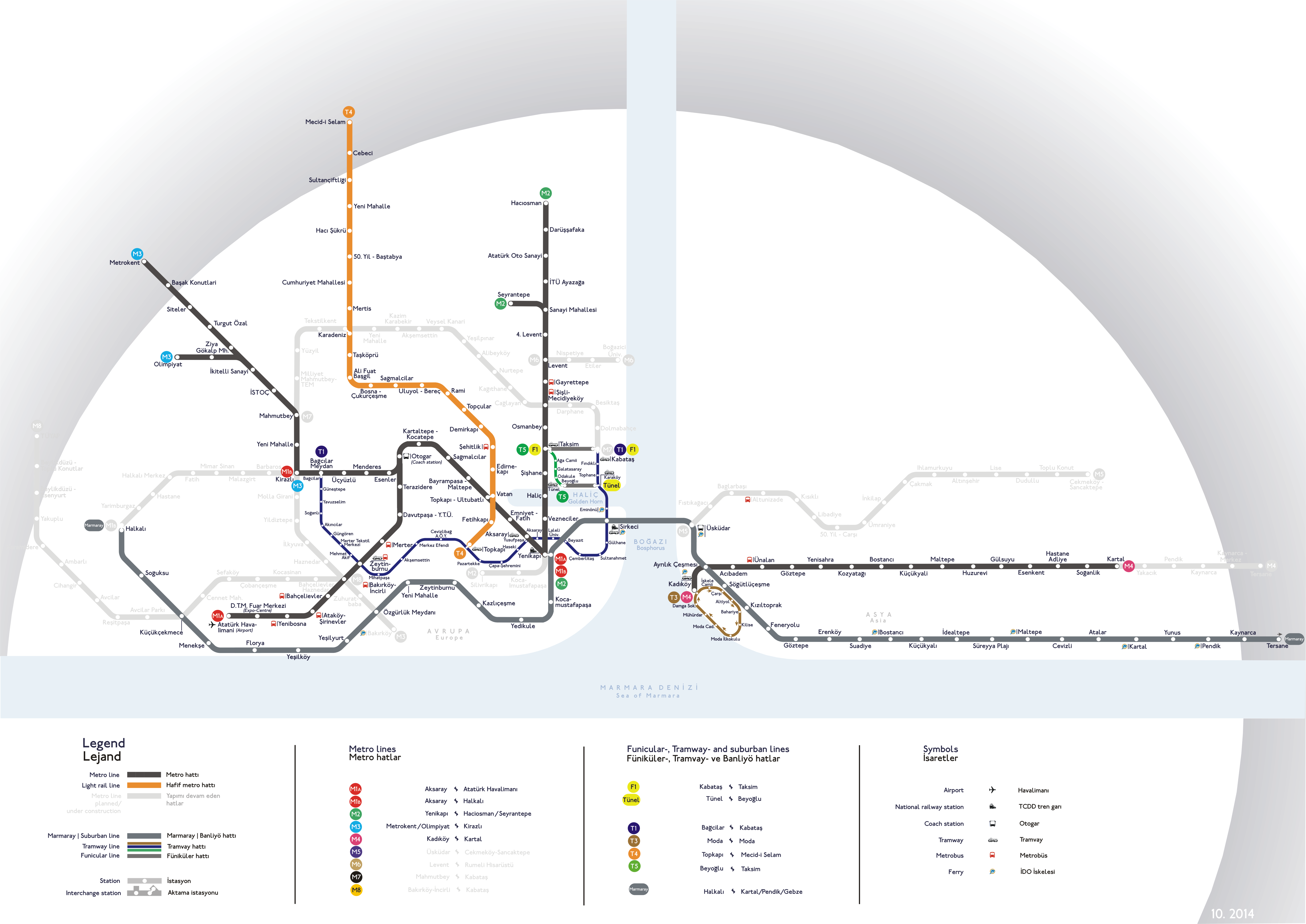
Tramway lines in the railway-network in Istanbul: T1 (blue) and T4 (orange)

- 1961 – The last tram ran on the European side on 12 January. Topkapı-Eminönü line was replaced by trolleybuses on 27 May. Six trams were transferred to the Asian side network.
- 1966 – The last tram ran on the Asian side on 3 October from Kadıköy to Üsküdar. Remaining trams were transferred to the transport museum.
- 1984 – Trolleybus service ended on 16 July. Thus all electric city transport in Istanbul was eliminated, apart from the Tünel (funicular).
- 1990 – İstiklal Caddesi (Independence Avenue) was closed to traffic. Trams returned to the European side of Istanbul as a heritage tram line, the Taksim-Tünel Nostalgia Tramway (sometimes called T5 line), operating on İstiklal Caddesi between Taksim and Tünel. Rolling stocks were same as the pre-1966 trams.
- 1992 – By opening a completely separate tram system, trams returned to Istanbul as a modern system. It started on the same alignment where trams last ran in 1956. The first service was started between Beyazıt & Yusufpaşa as line T1. It was served by high-floor light rail vehicles.
- 2003 – Trams returned to the Asian side of Istanbul as heritage tramway, operating a circular tramway on the old closed Route 20 tramway. The rolling stock was imported from Gotha, Thuringia, Germany. This line is now known as the T3 tramline (or the Kadıköy-Moda Nostalgia Tramway).
- 2004 – T1 line's rolling stock was replaced by low-floor Bombardier Flexity Swift trams.
- 2006 – Tram system extends farther west, but as a separate line: T2. Although both lines' gauges were the same, T2 used high-floor light rail vehicles (LRVs) rolling stock.
- 2007 – Another tramline, named T4, which uses high-floor light rail vehicles (LRVs), opened.
- 2009 – Plans to replace all high-floor ABB, Duewag and Rotem trams with Alstom Citadis low floor trams, while connecting T1 and T2, were implemented. T4 line extended to Topkapı.
- 2011 – The first Alstom Citadis low-floor trams enter service. As a result, the combination of lines T1 and T2, into a new single line T1, is complete.
- 2016 – Tenders for the new Eminönü-Alibeyköy line to be constructed along the Golden Horn were received on 29 June.
- 2021 – The first segment of Istanbul's T5 tram line alongside the Golden Horn waterway opened on 4 January.
- 2023 - Remaining portion of T5 between Cibali and Eminönü opens on 30 August.
- 2024 - The T6 tram line reusing the old Kazlıçeşme-Sirkeci commuter rail alignment begins operation on 26 February.

== Tram routes ==
The modern tramline T1 now runs from Kabataş to Bağcılar. Modern tramline T4 runs from Topkapı to Mescid-i Selam. The tram routes mostly run on reserved tracks. Part of the network is elevated, and small parts of the tramway involve street running on unreserved tracks. The system serves mostly the old parts of the city.

=== T1 Line ===
==== Characteristics ====
- Total length – 19.3 kilometers (12.0 mi)
- Number of stations – 31
- Opened – 13 June 1992
- Operating hours – 6.00 A.M. to Midnight
- Frequency – 2 minutes (peak hour) to 15 minutes
- Daily passengers – 320,000
- Fare – TL 7.67, for students: 3.74 TL

==== Route ====
T1 station list with transfer points.

This T1 route goes from the district of Bağcılar which is a bit west north part of the city to Zeytinburnu, then parallel the shore of Sea of Marmara north east through the Byzantine city walls at Topkapı (the Cannon Gate, not the palace), then eastward via Yusufpaşa/Aksaray, then past the Grand Bazaar (Kapalı Çarşı) and along Divan Yolu to Sultanahmet—the Hippodrome—the historic centre of Old İstanbul.

From Sultanahmet, the T1 line continues to Sirkeci Terminus and Eminönü (quays), across the Galata Bridge over the Golden Horn to Karaköy Square (Galata, starting-point for the Tünel up to Beyoğlu's İstiklâl Caddesi), very near the Yolcu Salonu passenger ship dock.

From Karaköy, T1 continues to Tophane, near the İstanbul Modern Art Museum, then to Kabataş, with its "Sea Bus" catamaran ferry dock and modern funicular to Taksim Square.

The T1 modern tramway was built following, for the most part, the previous tramway which was closed in 1962. The line from Kabataş to Topkapı was previously served by tram Routes 12, 15, 16, 17, 22, 23, 24, 32, 33, 34 (see Trams in Istanbul (1871-1966)). The Galata Bridge was also served by trams previously, although this bridge and other parts of the former tram route was totally unreserved track, while the present route is mostly on reserved track right of way. On the reserved portions of the line, rails are often raised like metro/suburban train to run fast, and stops on these parts have platforms, illuminated covering, etc. All stops on the T1 line have ticket counters and magnetic ticket gates (just like the Istanbul Metro). In the busiest sections, tracks are also elevated, and the reserved/elevated track areas have separate light systems for improved visibility and safely. In the unreserved portions of the T1 line, recent tracks were paved with tiles for a gentler look. In some cases, tracks are laid on both side of the road, while sometimes on either the left or the right side of the road, and still other times in middle of road if running on a narrow street. On the Galata Bridge, tracks are in middle of the bridge on a fully dedicated right of way. At some stops, there is a staircase link from the road via a bridge to the tram stop, to promote safe crossing of the road for those taking the tram.

=== T4 Line ===
==== Characteristics ====
- Total length – 15.3 kilometers (9.5 mi)
- Number of stations – 22
- Opened – 12 September 2007
- Operating hours – 6.00 A.M. to Midnight
- Frequency – 5 minutes (peak hour)
- Daily passengers – 95,000
- Fare – TL 7.67, for students: 3.74 TL

==== Route ====
T4 station list with surface and sub-surface sections.

The T4 tramway follows a generally north–south route between Mescid-i Selam and Topkapı. Seven of the T4 line's 22 stations are underground – these are Edirnekapı, Topçular, Rami, Uluyol – Bereç, Ali Fuat Başgil, Taşköprü and Karadeniz. All other stations are at-grade. The T4 line, even more than the T1 line, corresponds to light rail standards, in that its at-grade stations are made up of fortified platforms in the central median of the road, which allows for flat run-starts. These stations are accessible via pedestrian bridges, underpasses or signal light-controlled crossings. T4 does not include sections of street running, but operates in its own separate right-of-way. However, the T4 line does include at-grade road and intersection crossings controlled by traffic signals. Because of this, it is categorized as a "tramway" by its operator, Metro İstanbul.

=== T5 Line ===
==== Characteristics ====
- Total length – 10.1 kilometers (6.3 mi)
- Number of stations – 14
- Opened – 4 January 2021

==== Route ====
T5 station list with transfer points.

=== T6 Line ===
==== Characteristics ====
- Total length – 8.394 kilometers (5.216 mi)
- Number of stations – 8
- Opened – 26 February 2024

== Rolling stock ==
After opening in 1992, and until 2004, the T1 tram line was originally operated using high-floor ABB light rail vehicles (LRVs). Starting in 2004, the original LRVs on the T1 line were replaced by low-floor trams, first from Bombardier, and later from Alstom. However, the T4 line still operates using high-floor vehicles, such as Düwags, Hyundais and "İstanbuls".

=== T1 ===
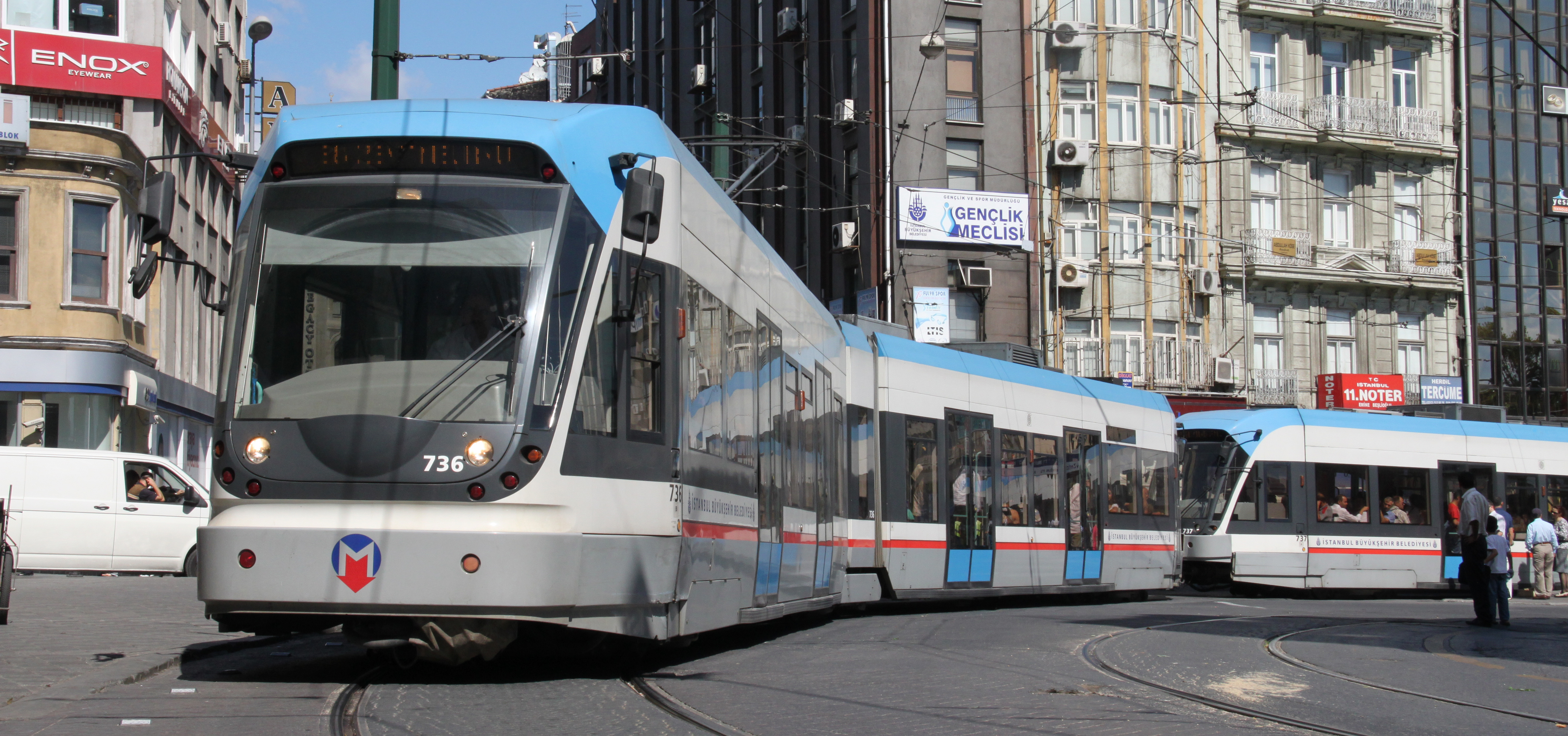
Bombardier Flexity trams

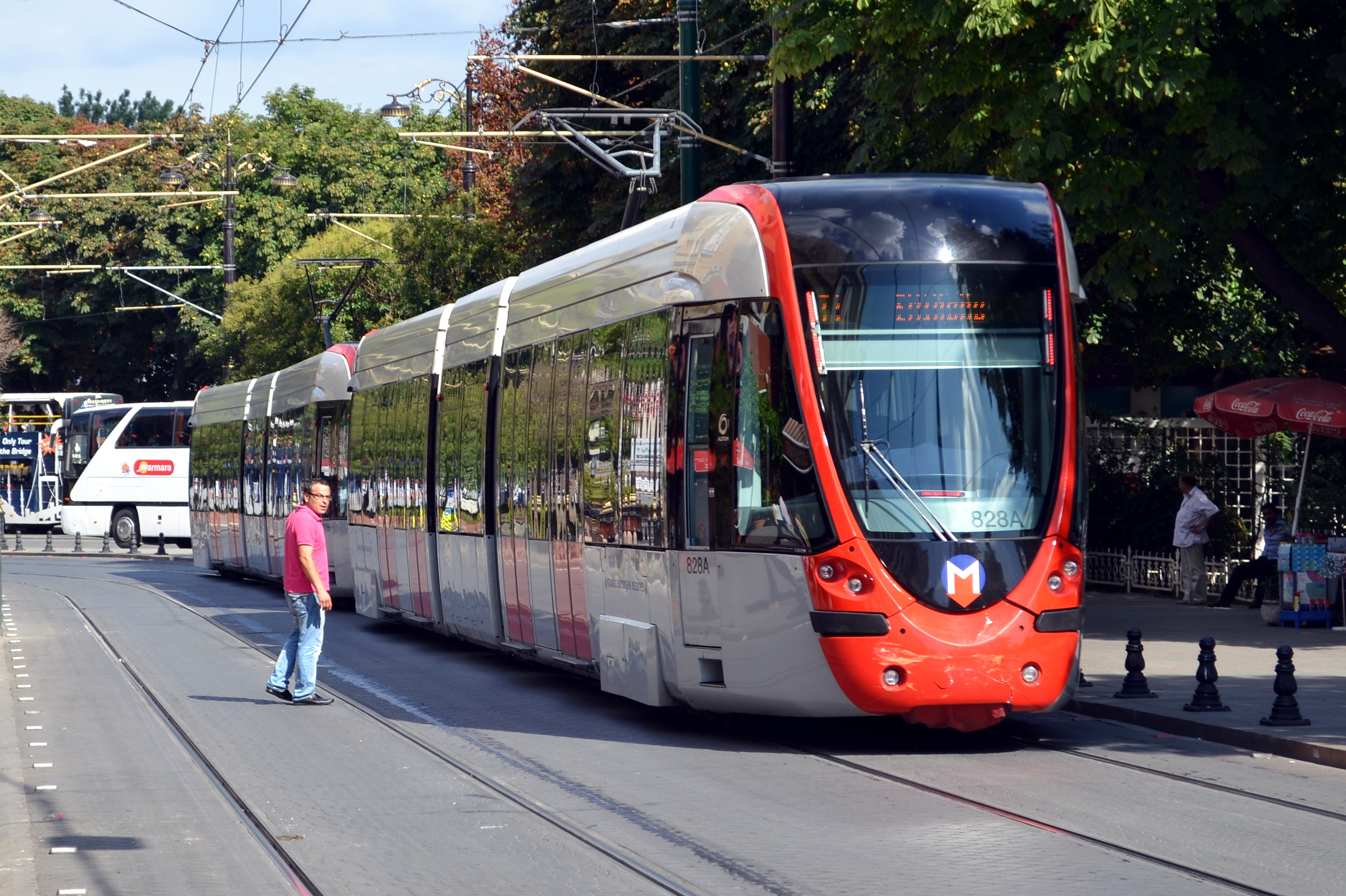
Alstom Citadis tram

==== Bombardier Flexity Swift ====
In summer 2001, 27 Bombardier Flexity Swift low-floor tram vehicles were ordered for the T1 tramway. They went into service in 2004, after the platforms on the T1 stops had been lowered to allow the use of low-floor trams. All of these trams are low-floor, and fully air conditioned, and can run at high speeds on reserved tracks. Each tram train operates in a two-cars train set. In peak hours, such two-car trams can be coupled together to make a four-car long tram set.

==== Alstom Citadis 304 ====
In 2007, 80 new Alstom Citadis 304 trams were ordered. The first Alstom Citadis tram entered service on the T1 line in 2011.

=== T4 ===
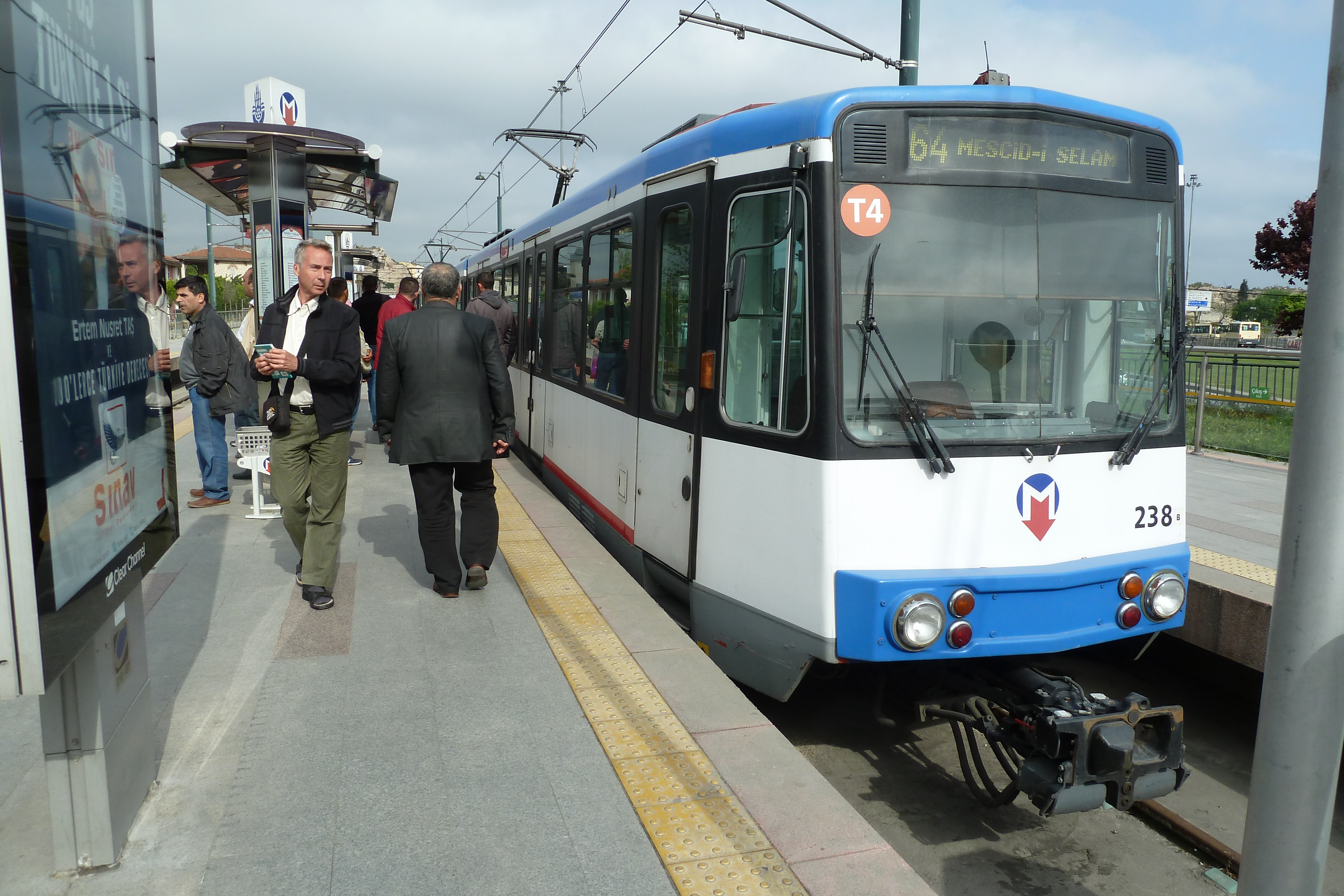
Duewag B80/B100 tram

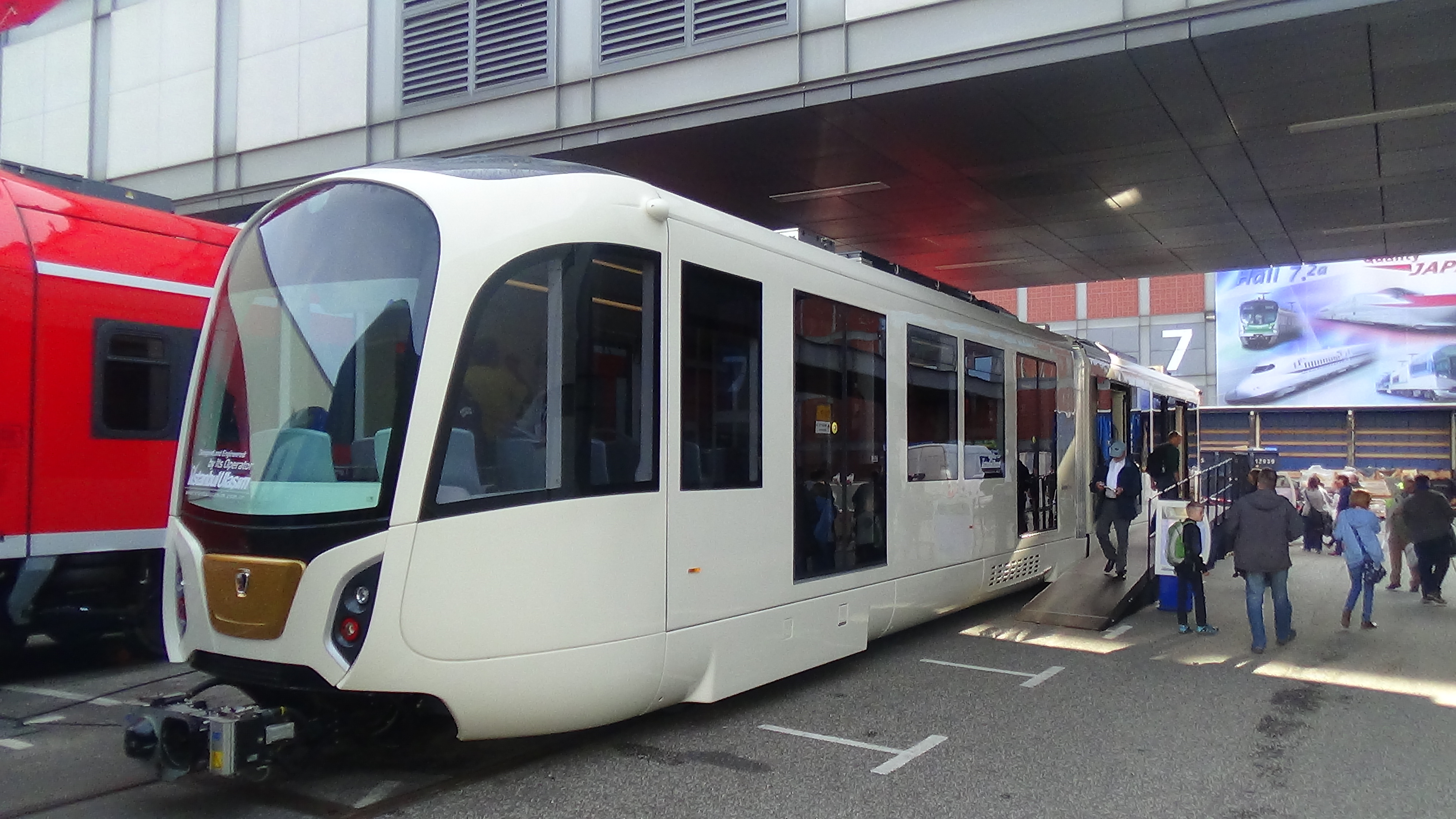
RTE 2014 "İstanbul" tram at an exposition

==== Duewag KTA (Köln Tramvay Aracı) ====
These are old B80S and B100S sets that were used on Cologne Stadtbahn and purchased in 2007. They were used on both lines, (including the former line T2) and with the arrival of Alstom Citadis trams, they began to operate on the T4 line only.

==== Hyundai Rotem LRV34 ====
From 2008, 63 units.

==== RTE 2014 "İstanbul" ====
More recently (from 2014) new high-floor trams that were constructed by Metro Istanbul (the operator) itself are also used. During its development, there were intermediate models (RTE 2000 and RTE 2009) that operated on the line.

=== T5 ===
==== Durmazlar Panorama ====
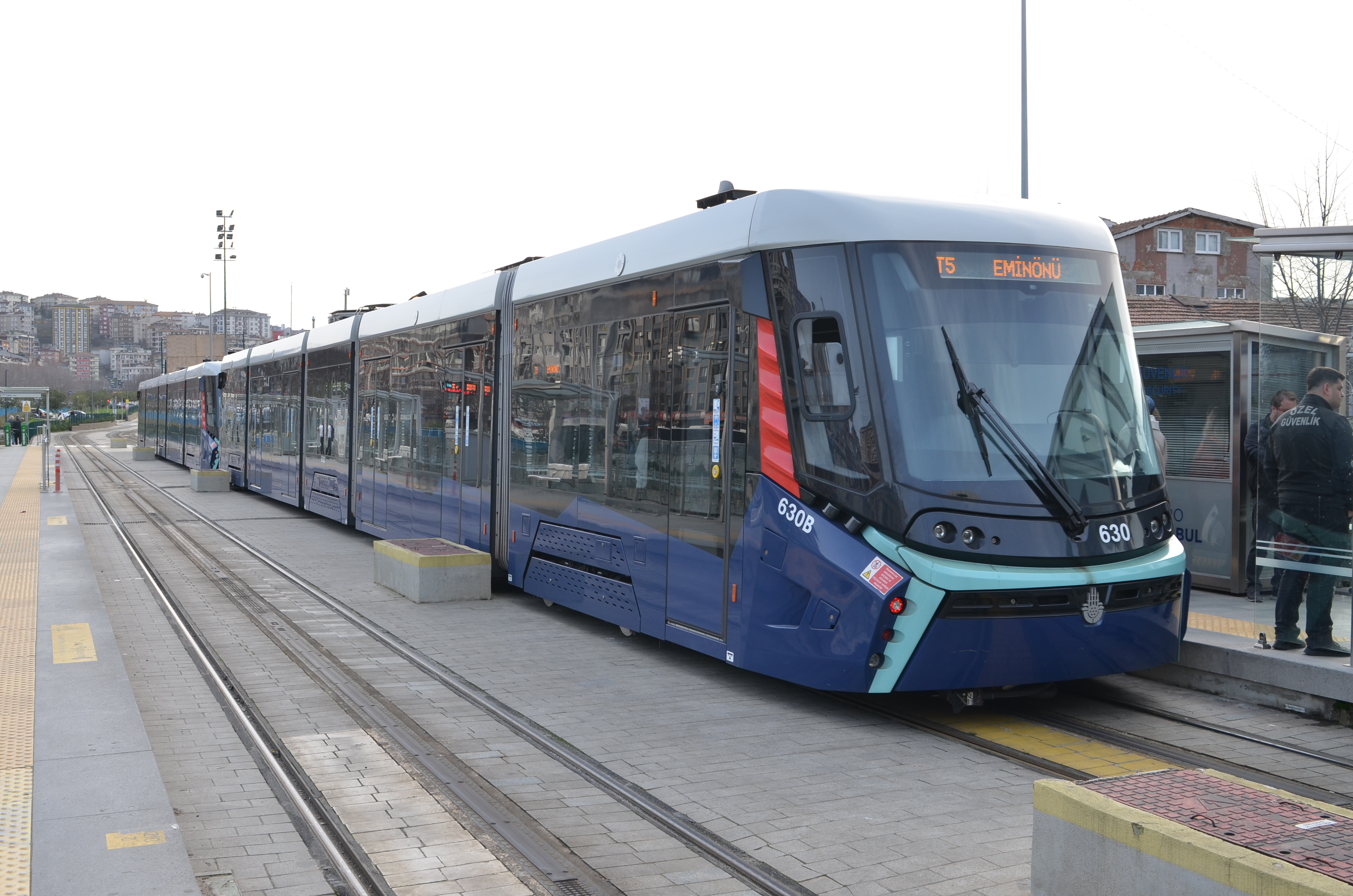
A coupled pair of Panorama trams at Alibeyköy Metro station on the T5, 2026

The Istanbul Metropolitan Municipality ordered 30 Panorama trams in January 2018, for operation on the under construction T5 line of the Istanbul tram network in Istanbul, Turkey. The first tram was unveiled in March 2019, and began test running on the line on 19 March 2019. The trams entered service along with the line on 4 January 2021. The last of the 30 trams for the line was delivered on 24 November 2022.

Unlike other Panorama trams built, the vehicles in Istanbul use Alstom's APS catenary-free power supply system, and are also capable of running in coupled sets.

== Depots and termini ==
Kabataş, Eminönü, Cevizlibağ, & Bağcılar are the four termini on the T1 line. Topkapı and Mescid-i Selam are the two termini on the T4 line. Alibeyköy Cep Otogarı and Eminönü are the two termini on the T5 line.

== Future plans ==
In the future, there are planned branch lines from Zeytinburnu to Bakırköy, from Kabataş to Beşiktaş, and from Eminönü to Bayrampaşa. This line may further run from Bağcılar to Spor Salonu in future. There may be a new line from Kadıköy to Bostancı on the Asian side (if built, it would follow the original Istanbul tram Route 4).

The possibility to transform the current T4 line to a true metro line (as some sections already run underground) and to extend it to the city-center (to Vezneciler) in the south and to Istanbul Airport in the north is also under consideration.

== See also ==
- Public transport in Istanbul
- Istanbul nostalgic tramways
- Sabiha Gökçen Airport
- Metrobus (Istanbul)
- Ferries in Istanbul
- Istanbul Airport
- Istanbul Metro
- Marmaray
