= Fenerbahce (fish) =

Scientific classification
- Kingdom: Animalia
- Phylum: Chordata
- Class: Actinopterygii
- Order: Cyprinodontiformes
- Family: Nothobranchiidae
- Genus: Fenerbahce; Özdikmen, Polat, Yılmaz & Yazıcıoğlu, 2006

Type species
- Adamas formosus Huber, 1979

Genus of fishes

Fenerbahce is a genus of fish in the family Nothobranchiidae endemic to Africa where they are only known from the Congo Basin. The current genus name was adopted to replace the genus Adamas Huber, 1979 which was a junior homonym of the genus Adamas Malaise, 1945 of the sawfly family Tenthredinidae.

== Etymology ==
The genus has been named in honor of Fenerbahçe SK, a major Turkish multi-sport club based in Istanbul, Turkey. The name literally means "lighthouse garden" in Turkish (from fener, meaning "lighthouse", and bahçe, meaning "garden"), deriving from an ancient lighthouse located at Fenerbahçe Cape.

== Species ==
There are currently two recognized species in this genus:

- Fenerbahce devosi Sonnenberg, Woeltjes & Van der Zee, 2011
- Fenerbahce formosus (Huber, 1979) (Starhead killi)
