= Istanbul nostalgic tramways =

Heritage tram system in Istanbul, Turkey

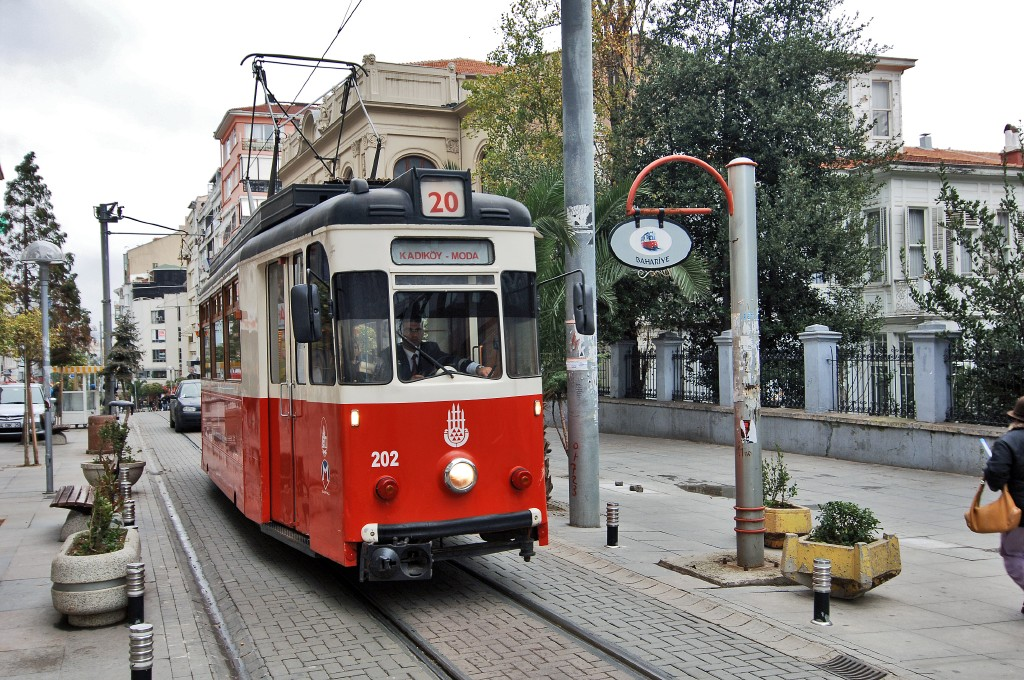
- Top: Two heritage trams on the European side, on the Taksim-Tünel (T2) Nostalgia Tramway. Bottom: Istanbul 202 (ex-Jena 102) on the Asian side, on the T3 circular nostalgia tramway.

Overview
- Locale: Istanbul, Turkey
- Transit type: Heritage Tram
- Number of lines: 2 (1 European side, 1 Asian side)
- Number of stations: 5 (T2); 10 (T3)
- Website: http://nostaljiktramvay.iett.istanbul/ T3 Nostalgia Tramway

Operation
- Began operation: 29 December 1990 (T2); 1 November 2003 (T3)
- Operators: IETT (T2); Metro Istanbul (T3)

Technical
- System length: 1.6 km (0.99 mi) (T2); 2.6 km (1.6 mi) (T3)
- Track gauge: 1,000 mm (3 ft 3 3/8 in)

The Istanbul nostalgic tramways are two heritage tramlines in the city of Istanbul, Turkey. The city has two completely separate heritage tram systems, one on the European side (the Taksim-Tünel Nostalgia Tramway, aka. T2 line), the other on the Asian side (T3 line, aka. the Kadıköy-Moda Nostalgia Tramway).

Istanbul, the former capital of Turkey, once had a large tramway network on both the Asian and European sides. These started as horse trams in 1871, but gradually changed to electric. Many routes were built step by step, and the network reached its greatest extent in 1956 with 108 million passengers in 270 cars on 56 lines. But as happened in most cities around the world, tram service in Istanbul began to close in 1956, and ended completely in 1966.

Trams returned to Istanbul in 1990, with the opening of the Taksim-Tünel Nostalgia Tramway (T2 line). The city is divided between Asia and Europe, and while the Asian side has a heritage tram system (T3 line, which opened in 2003), the European side has both a heritage tram (T2 line) and a modern tram system (T1 and T4 lines, which opened in 1992 and 2007, respectively).

== History ==
After closing the tram network in the mid-1960s, the people of Istanbul thought that transport within the city would move faster than before, but this proved false some years later. The uncontrolled increase of petrol vehicles such as buses, taxis, and private cars started choking the streets of Istanbul. Turkey suffered many of the problems of developing countries, including pollution, traffic jams, migration, and rapid population increase. A growing population increased the urbanization of Istanbul, and with it more motor vehicles which increased air and noise pollution, traffic jams and smog.

From the early 1970s, these problems increased and by the mid-1980s Istanbulians realized that lack of control of motor vehicles and the closure of the tram network were great mistakes. Due to constantly increasing traffic jams and air pollution, Istanbul became one of the most polluted Eurasian cities during the mid-1980s. Many cities around the world like Tunis, Sydney, Buenos Aires etc. also understood that error, and like them, Istanbul also planned for the return of trams.

Looking at examples in other cities around the world (e.g. Lima and Buenos Aires), the authorities planned to bring trams back to Istanbul. By then, the number of cars and buses had increased so much that starting a completely new tramway was not possible at that time. Instead they planned an experimental heritage tramway, mindful of the lower installation cost, mainly as tourist attraction, and as a test system to see how trams would be accepted by the younger generations in Istanbul.

The original Istanbul tram network was almost completely destroyed, including depots, termini, electric power stations, etc., except for some of the rolling stock which had been preserved in transport museums. The Authority wished to re-introduce heritage trams in Istanbul using the same type of rolling stock which was running in the European part until 1962, and in the Asian part until 1966. Using old photographs, people's memories, and other sources, some rolling stock was built for the European side resembling pre-1962 European-side tram stock, including the size, shape, interior, color scheme etc. The prototypes had originally been built in 1915.

Around 1990, the Istiklal Caddesi became a pedestrian zone, and the tram was restored and revived in 1990, in the form of the Taksim-Tünel Nostalgia Tramway. After a 24-year absence, trams returned to Istanbul. The length of the line is 1.64 kilometers (1.02 mi) and there are 5 stops.

After the Taksim-Tünel Nostalgia Tramway gained in popularity, mainly among tourists, another heritage tramway opened in 2003 on the Asian side of Istanbul, as what is now known as the T3 line (or the Kadıköy-Moda Nostalgia Tramway). In the case of the T3 line, first-generation trams were not re-installed along the route. Instead, secondhand trams from Germany were acquired, mostly from the Jena tram system, which were built in the Berlin area or in Gotha (see Rolling stock section, below).

Trams on the T3 line run on a clockwise circular loop, following roughly the old tram Route 20. The length of the line is 2.6 kilometers (1.6 mi) and there are 10 stops.

=== Timeline ===
- 1961 – The last tram ran on the European side of Istanbul on 12 January 1961. The Topkapi-Eminönü line was replaced by trolleybuses on 27 May 1961. Six trams were transferred to the tram network on the Asian side.
- 1966 – The last tram ran on the Asian side of Istanbul on 3 October 1966, between Kadıköy and Kızıltoprak. The remaining trams were transferred to the transport museum.
- 1984 – Trolleybus service stopped on 16 July 1984. At this time, all electricity-driven city transport in Istanbul completely ended.
- 1990 – İstiklal Caddesi (Independence Avenue) was closed to traffic. Trams returned to the European side of Istanbul as a heritage tram line, the Taksim-Tünel Nostalgia Tramway, operating on İstiklal Caddesi between Taksim and Tünel. Rolling stocks were same as the pre-1966 trams.
- 1992 – Opening of a completely separate tramline: the tram system on the European side of Istanbul was expanded to include a modern tramline, built by Yapı Merkezi. The line, now called the T1 line, operates on the same alignment where trams last ran in 1956.
- 2003 – Trams returned to the Asian side of Istanbul as heritage tramway, operating a circular tramway on the part of the old closed Route 20 tramway. The secondhand rolling stock was imported from Jena and Schöneiche, Germany. This line is now known as the T3 tramline (or the Kadıköy-Moda Nostalgia Tramway).
- 2007 – Another modern tramline on the European side, named T4, opened, using high-floor light rail vehicles (LRVs).
- 2021 - The first catenary free tram line in the city opened between Alibeyköy and Cibali on the European side using modern low-floor trams. The line will be extended to Eminönü where it will meet the T1.

== Tram lines ==
There are two heritage tramways in Istanbul – the European side tramway, Taksim-Tünel Nostalgia Tramway (also sometimes called the T2 line), runs from Taksim to Tünel; the Asian side tramway, the T3 line (also called the Kadıköy-Moda Nostalgia Tramway), runs as a clockwise circular route from Kadıköy to Moda and back to Kadıköy. The European side T2 tramline follows an alignment of Istanbul's previous historic tram network, which was served by Routes 10, 11, 12, 15, 16, 17. The Asian side T3 tramline uses the previous Route 20 (operating on a portion of that route). A third line between Üsküdar and Harem is planned.

=== European side tramline: T2 Line (Taksim-Tünel Nostalgia Tramway) ===
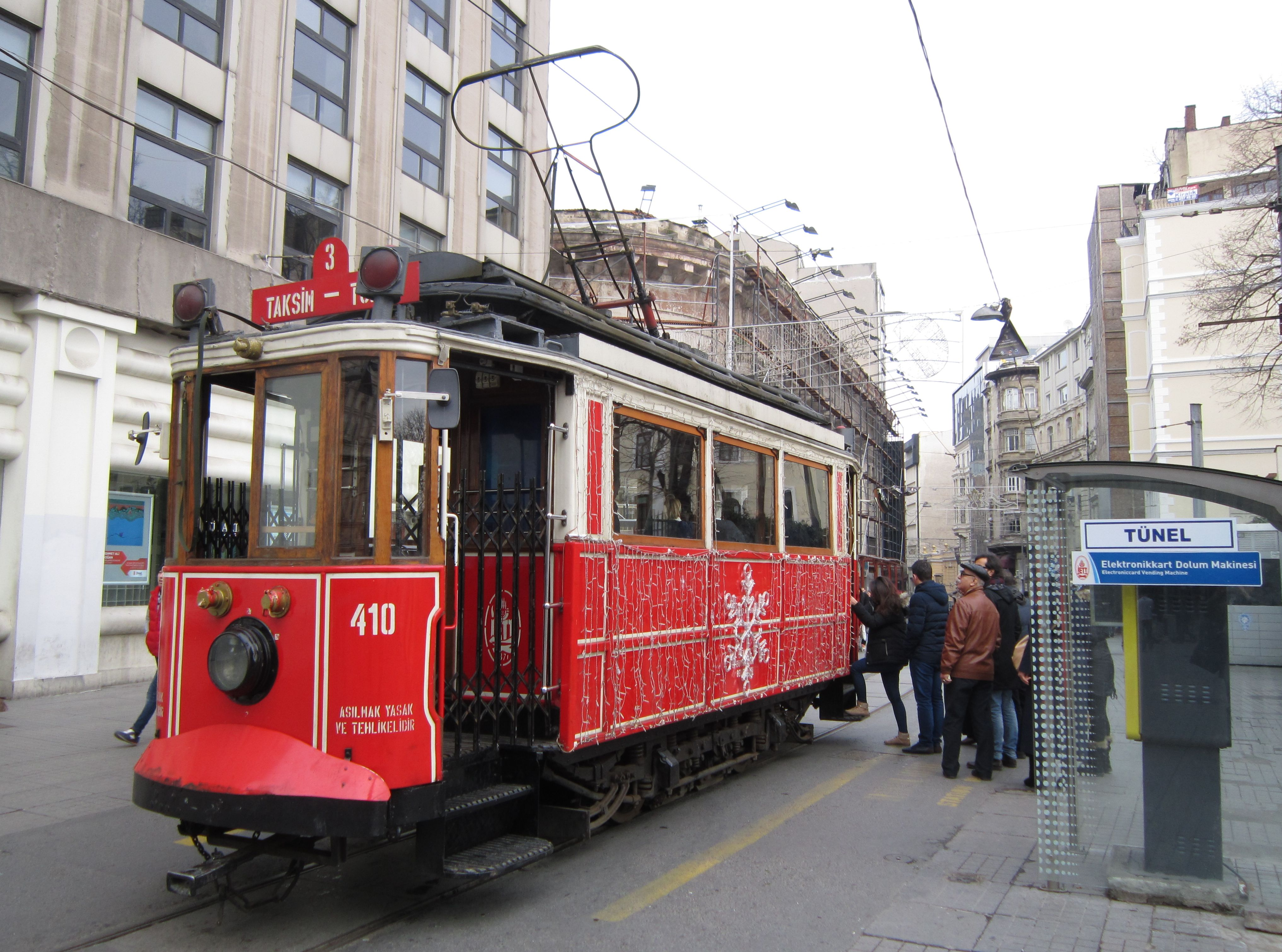
Tünel terminus of the T2 line

- Total length – 1.6 kilometers (0.99 mi)
- Opened – 29 December 1990
- Operating hours – 7 A.M. to 8 P.M.
- Frequency – 10 to 20 minutes.

=== Asian side tram: T3 Line (Kadıköy-Moda Nostalgia Tramway) ===
- Total length – 2.6 kilometers (1.6 mi)
- Opened – 1 November 2003
- Operating hours – 7 A.M. to 9 P.M.
- Frequency – 10 minutes (peak-hour).
- Route time, end-to-end – 20 minutes.

=== Alignment ===
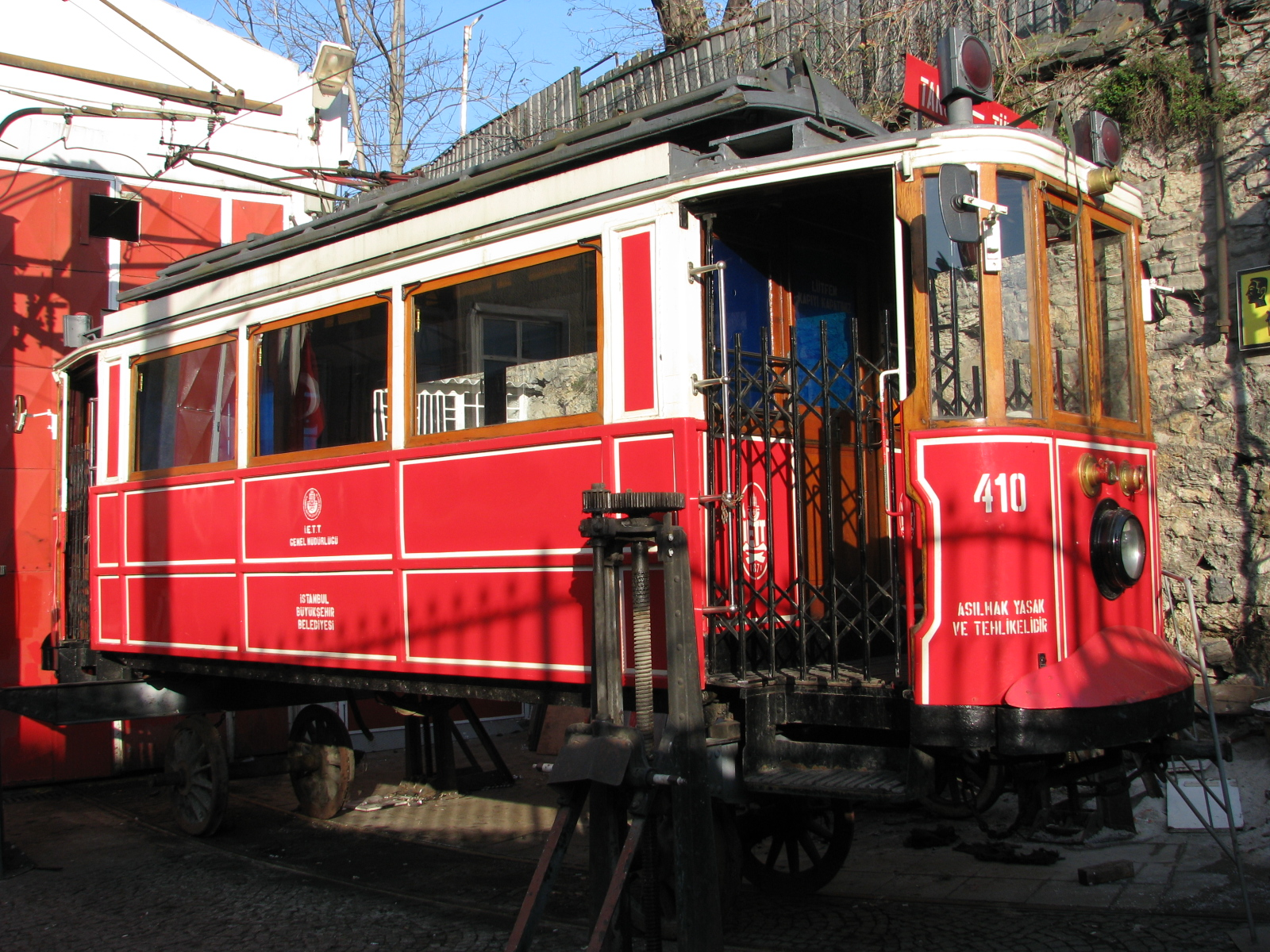
Tram depot close to the Taksim

Both nostalgic tramlines run on unreserved tracks, in regular street running operation.

The length of the European side Taksim-Tünel (T2) tramline is 1.6 kilometers (0.99 mi), with 5 stops, Taksim, Odakule, Galatasaray, Ağa Cami and Tünel (Şişhane). The line runs between Taksim and Tunel via İstiklal Caddesi (Independence Avenue). This road was formerly used by tram, bus & car. After the original tram line closed in 1962, the street was still used by buses and cars until 1990, when the area (Beyoğlu) was recognized as a heritage area because of the many historic buildings and shops. The municipal authority decided to convert this area to a pedestrian zone, banned most vehicles (taxis and delivery vehicles are still permitted) and resurfaced the road in concrete with a tactile finish. Many medium trees were planted in both the footpath and road and old-fashioned street lamps and curved chairs were also installed. Tram tracks were laid in the middle of the road as a single line, with a passing siding at Galatasaray Square that allows trams from opposite directions to pass each other. As the area is a popular entertainment and nightlife district, the driver must frequently ring the bell to clear the way of pedestrians, especially during the peak tourist season. Approximate passenger volume for this system is 6,000 people per day. Interchange with the Istanbul Metro (M2 line) is possible at Taksim and Şishane.

The length of the Asian side T3 tramline is 2.6 kilometers (1.6 mi) and there are 10 stations. The single-track loop has no sidings so all trams travel in a clockwise direction from Kadıköy Square along a bus lane, Bahariye Street, and Moda Street. Approximate passenger volume for this system is 2,000 people per day. The roads were resurfaced with concrete, but are also used by other road vehicles.

== Rolling stock ==
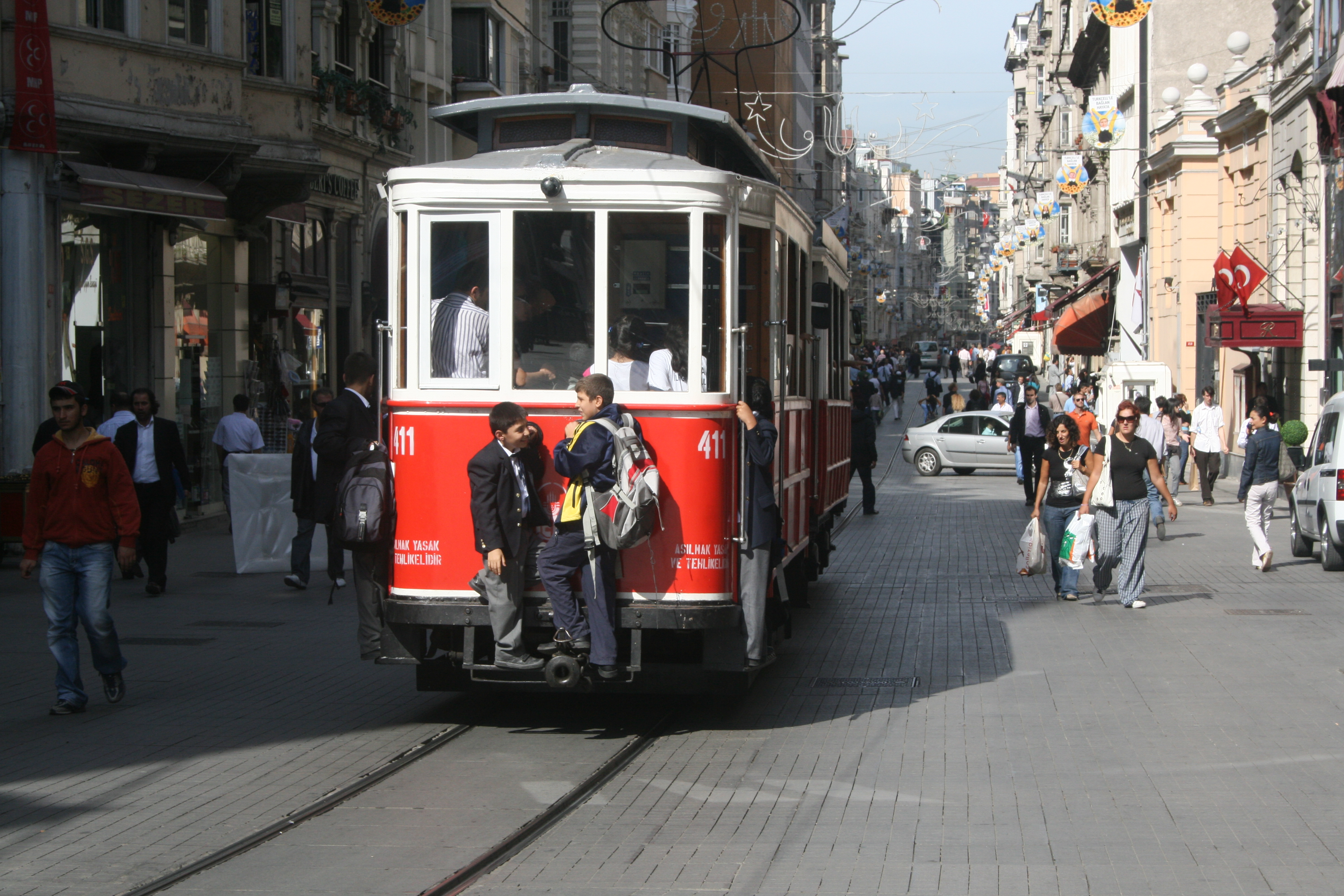
Heritage trams are often lowly respected in Istanbul, such as illegal riding like this

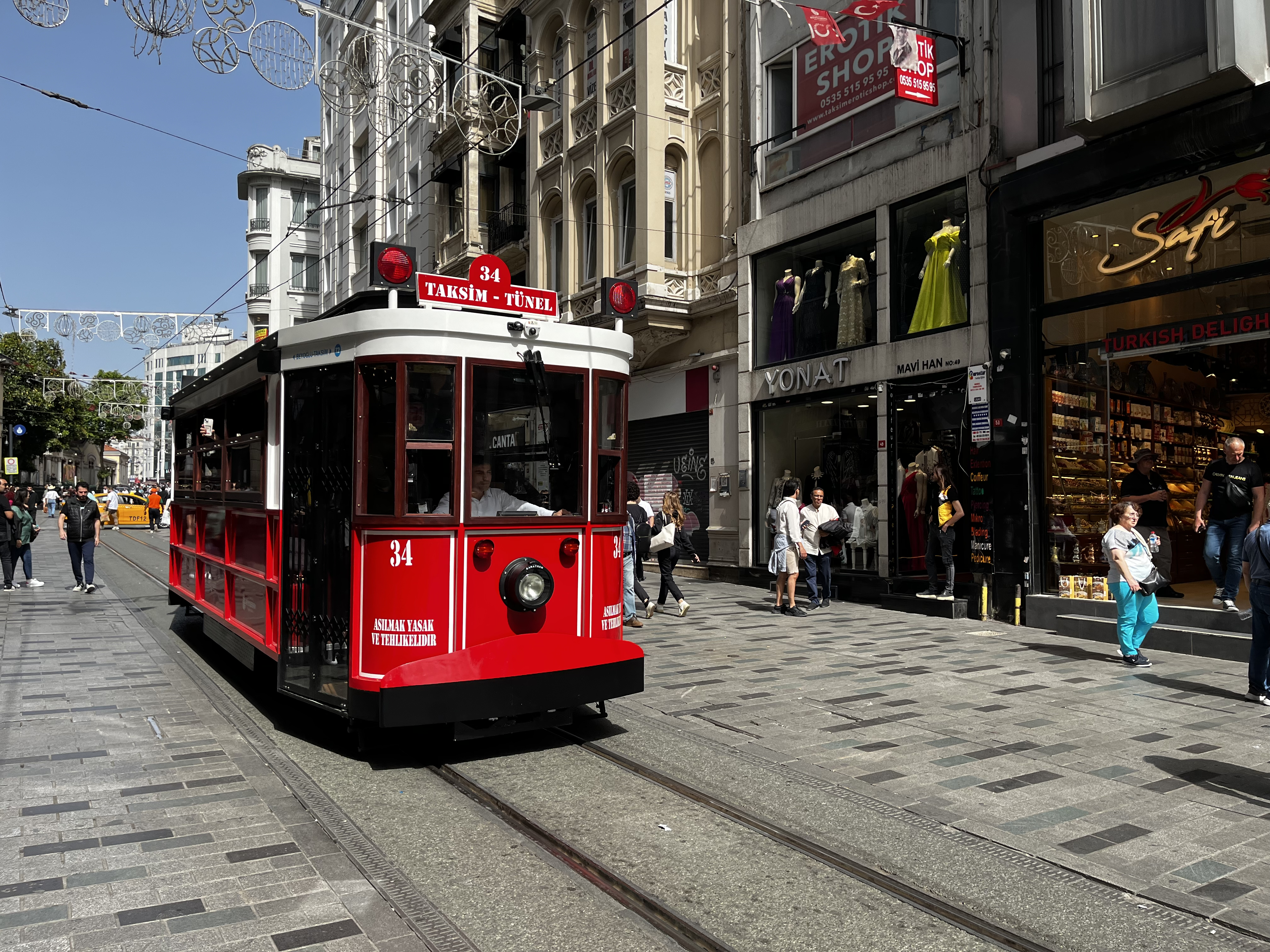
In 2024, the battery-powered nostalgic tram started to be used on the T2 line

On the European side T2 line, the tramcars are original Istanbul cars, from the first-generation tramway (closed in 1966), which were restored in the 1980s for use on the heritage tramway. During peak season, a trailer is often coupled to the motored tram for extra capacity. As of 2008, the motored trams include car 47, built in 1913; car 223, built in 1928; and car 410. Trailers are 411 and 418, built in Germany in 1914 and 1919, respectively.

On Asian side T3 line, the trams are secondhand from tram systems in Germany. All are two-axle trams of similar design, but made by two different builders and acquired from two different tram systems, both located in what was East Germany at the time these trams were built. Istanbul cars 201 and 203, which have four windows on each side, are a type of tram known as Rekowagen (de), built by Reichsbahnausbesserungswerk Berlin-Schöneweide (de), and were previously Jena tram system car 138 and Schöneiche bei Berlin tramway car 75. Car 202 was built by Gothaer Waggonfabrik (of Gotha) and is type Gotha T57, with three windows per side, and before being acquired by Istanbul it was No. 102 of the Jena tram system. Four more trams of type Gotha T57 were acquired from Jena in 2006. They were given fleet numbers 204–207 (ex-Jena 104, 110, 112 and 115, not necessarily in that order), but do not show their fleet numbers on the exterior, wearing advertisements instead. Ex-Jena cars 102 (now Istanbul 202) and 138 (now Istanbul 201) were built in 1958 and 1973, respectively. Ex-Jena 104, 110, 112 and 115 were built in 1960, 1961, 1958 and 1959, respectively, and the last three had been in the fleet of the Görlitz tram system until 1992. Ex-Schöneiche tramway car 75, now Istanbul 203, was built in 1975 (but to a 1950s design).

In 2024, battery-powered trams were added to the T2 line. Overhead power lines are planned to be removed in the future.

== Depots and termini ==
Tünel, Moda and Kadıköy are the three places where both the termini of the past system and nostalgic system of today are present. The current termini were built after complete redesign of Tünel, Moda and Kadıköy area. Taksim is still the city centre of Istanbul, which is now served by European side heritage tram.

== See also ==
- Public transport in Istanbul
- Sabiha Gökçen airport
- Metrobus (Istanbul)
- Ferries in Istanbul
- Istanbul Airport
- Istanbul Metro
- Istanbul Tram
- Marmaray
