= Topkapı, Fatih =

Topkapı
- Neighbourhood
- Location in Turkey Topkapı (Istanbul)
- Coordinates: 41°01′12″N 28°55′42″E
- Country: Turkey
- Province: Istanbul
- District: Fatih
- Population (2022): 10,218
- Time zone: UTC+3 (TRT)
- Postal code: 34096
- Area code: 0212

Topkapı (lit. 'Cannon Gate') is a neighbourhood in the municipality and district of Fatih, Istanbul Province, Turkey. Its population is 10,218 (2022).

== Location ==
Topkapı lies in the west end of Fatih district, under the ancient city walls. It is centred on the Kara Ahmed Pasha Mosque, which stands off Topkapı Caddesi, and is bounded by Vatan Caddesi to the north, and Turgut Ozal Millet Caddesi to the south.

== Name ==
Topkapı is so named because it was the site at which the Ottoman cannon known as "The Basilic" was deployed during the siege of 1453, against the St Romanus gate in the city walls. The gate was the point at which Sultan Mehmed II entered the city after it fell. The gate was renamed to commemorate this, and the neighbourhood takes its name from there.

== Transport ==
Topkapı was the site of Istanbul's main bus station, which lay outside the city wall, until 1994 when it was moved to Bayrampaşa. It is served by the Topkapı-Ulubatlı metro station, on M1, inside the wall, and by the Topkapı station outside the wall, which is an interchange between T1 and T4 tram lines, and Metrobus.

== Sources ==
- Mamboury, Ernest (1953). The Tourists' Istanbul. Istanbul: Çituri Biraderler Basımevi.
