= Jean Pascal Sébah =

Syriac-Armenian photographer (1872–1947)

Jean Pascal Sébah (1872 – 6 June 1947) was a Syriac-Armenian photographer. The son of Pascal Sébah, he continued the Sébah family's photographic legacy after his father's death in 1886.

== Life and career ==
Jean Pascal Sébah was the son of Pascal Sébah who had opened a photographic studio in Cairo from the mid-1850s and another studio in Constantinople from the early 1870s. The Sébah studio had earned a reputation for the foremost Orientalist photography in the region.

Following his father's death on 25 June 1886, the studio continued in business. Initially it was managed by his uncle, Cosmi (his father's brother), and in 1888 Pollicarpe Joaillier became a partner. At this time the company was renamed Sebah & Joaillier Jean Pascal Sébah, also joined in 1888 and went on to run the studio with other photographers. The firm developed a reputation as the leading representative of Orientalist photography and in 1889 was appointed the Photographers by Appointment to the Prussian Court.

In 1893, Sultan Abdulhamid II sponsored fifty-one photographic albums representing the span of the Ottoman Empire with two of the volumes produced by Sebah & Joaillier. U.S. President Grover Cleveland was one of the recipients of the photo collection and it is now in the Library of Congress in the USA.

The "Foto Sabah" studio in Pera, Constantinople, was the most prestigious photography studio in the city for many decades during the 19th and 20th centuries. Their photographs depicted sites such as the Hagia Sophia, the Blue Mosque and the Galata Tower.

== Death ==
Sébah died on 6 June 1947, at the age of 75.

== Gallery ==
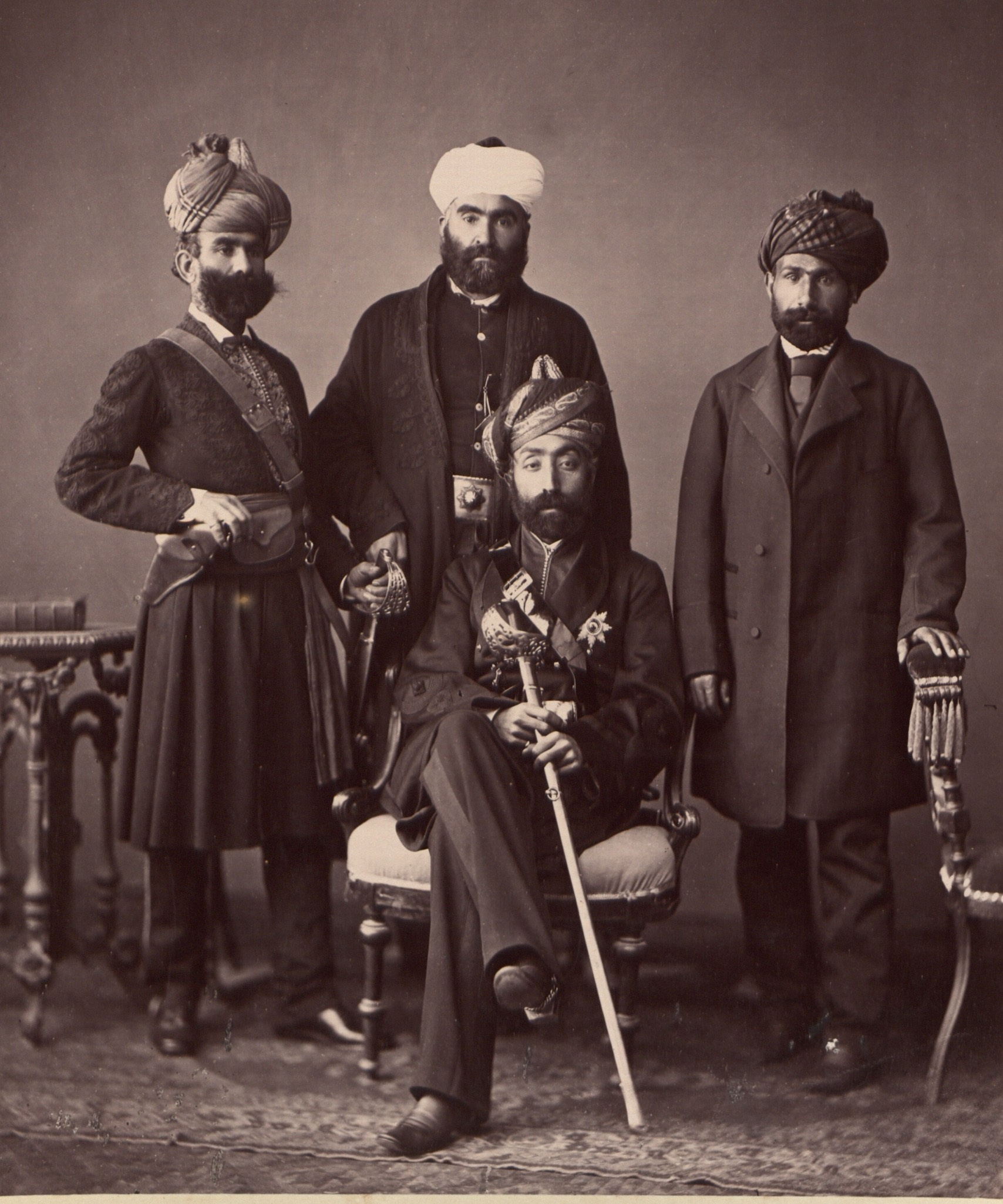
Ottoman dignitaries

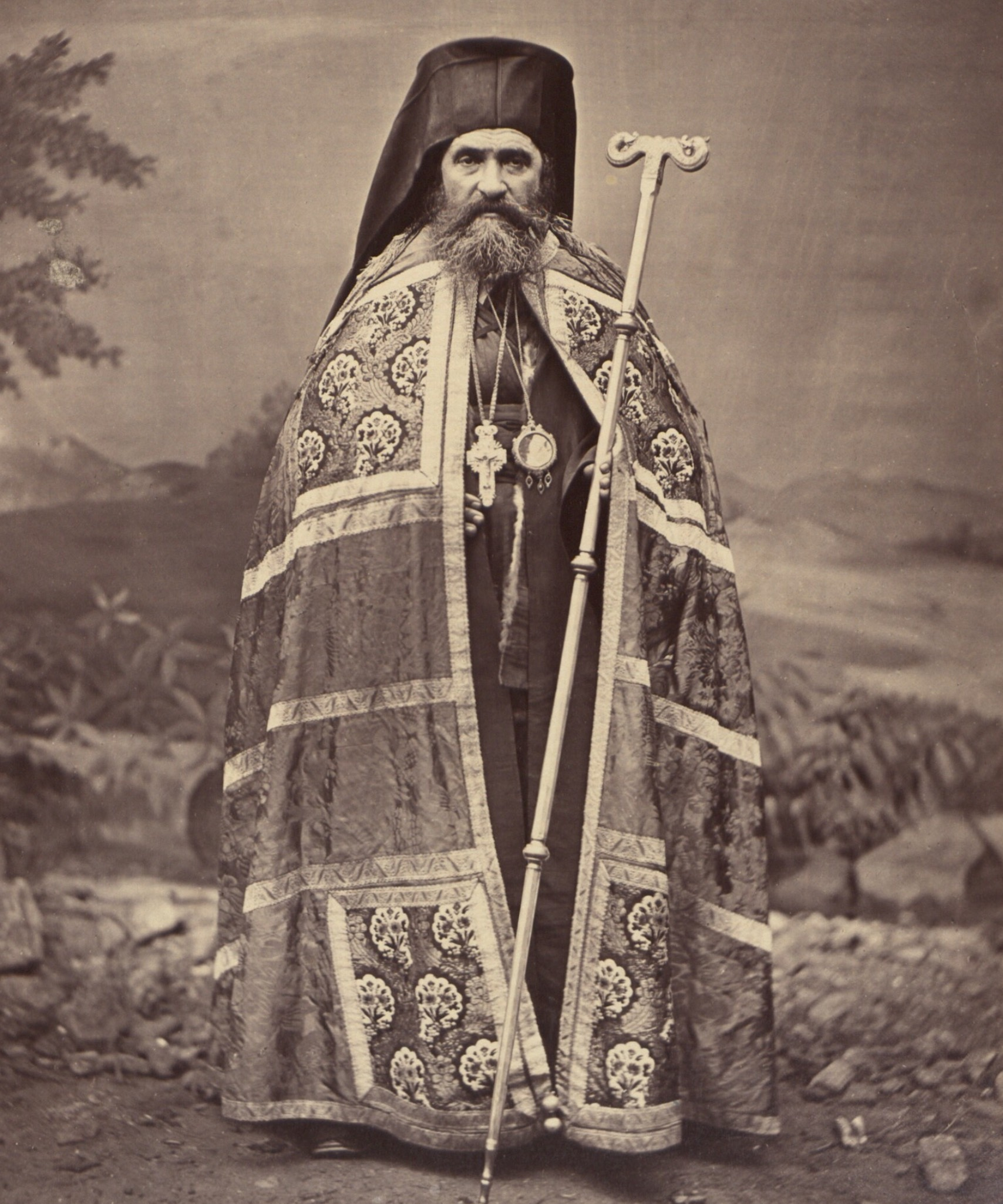
Orthodox clergyman

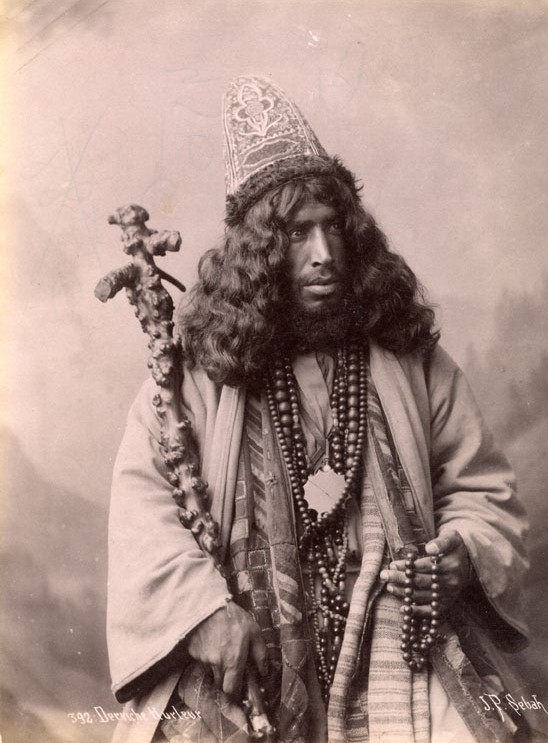
Turkish dervish

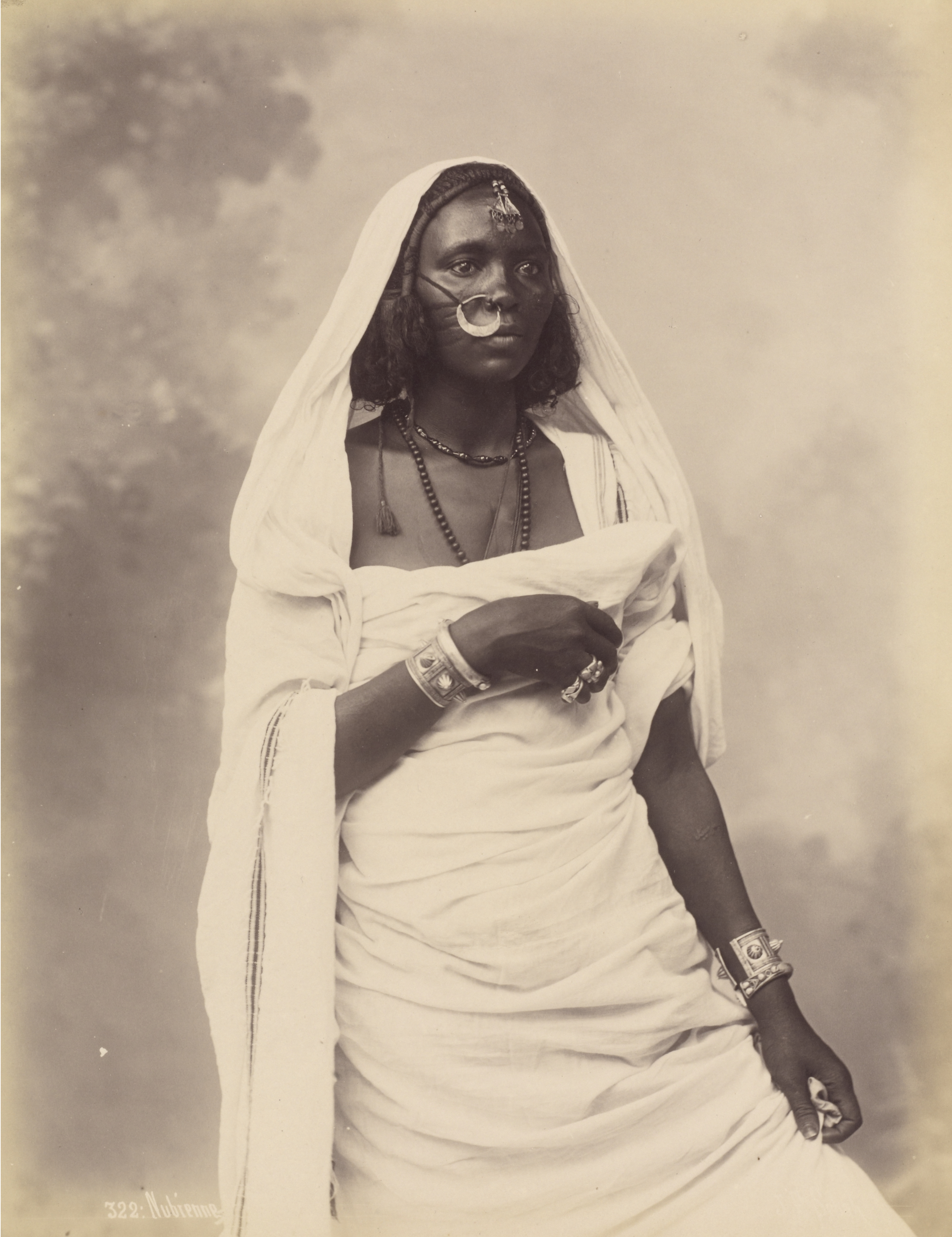
Nubian woman

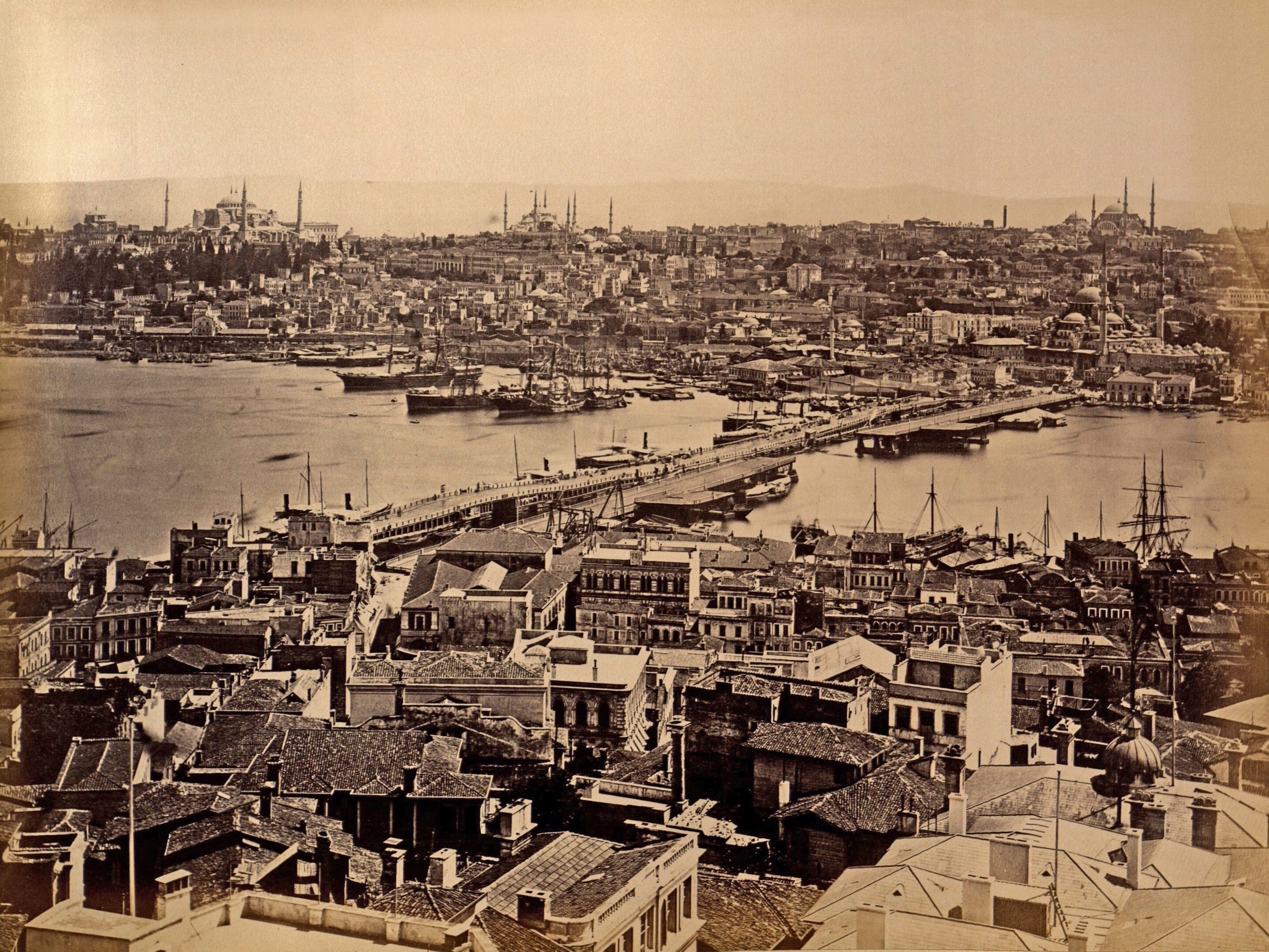
View of Constantinople

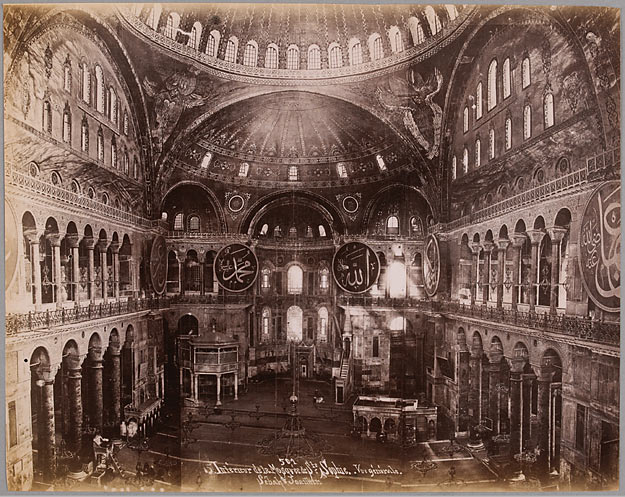
Interior of Hagia Sophia mosque

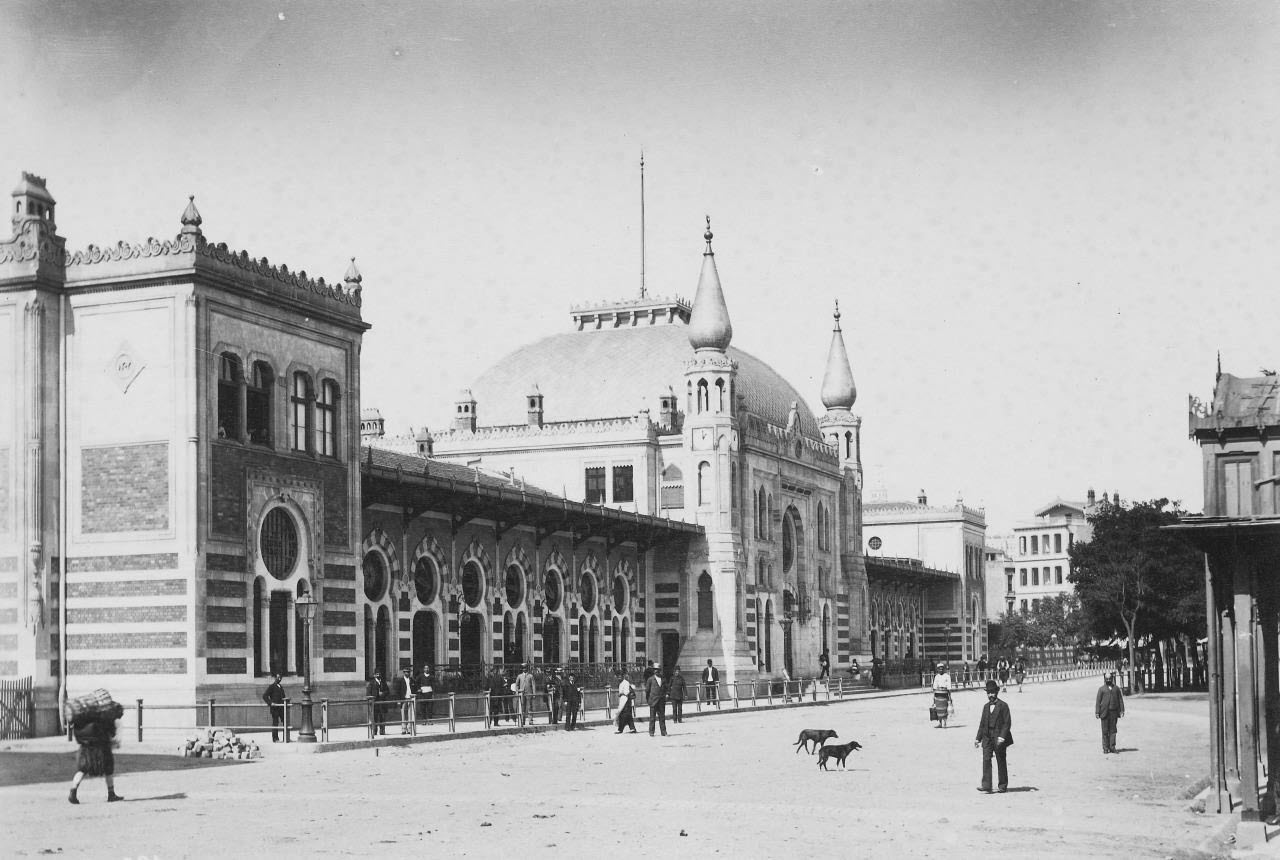
Sirkeci train station, Constantinople

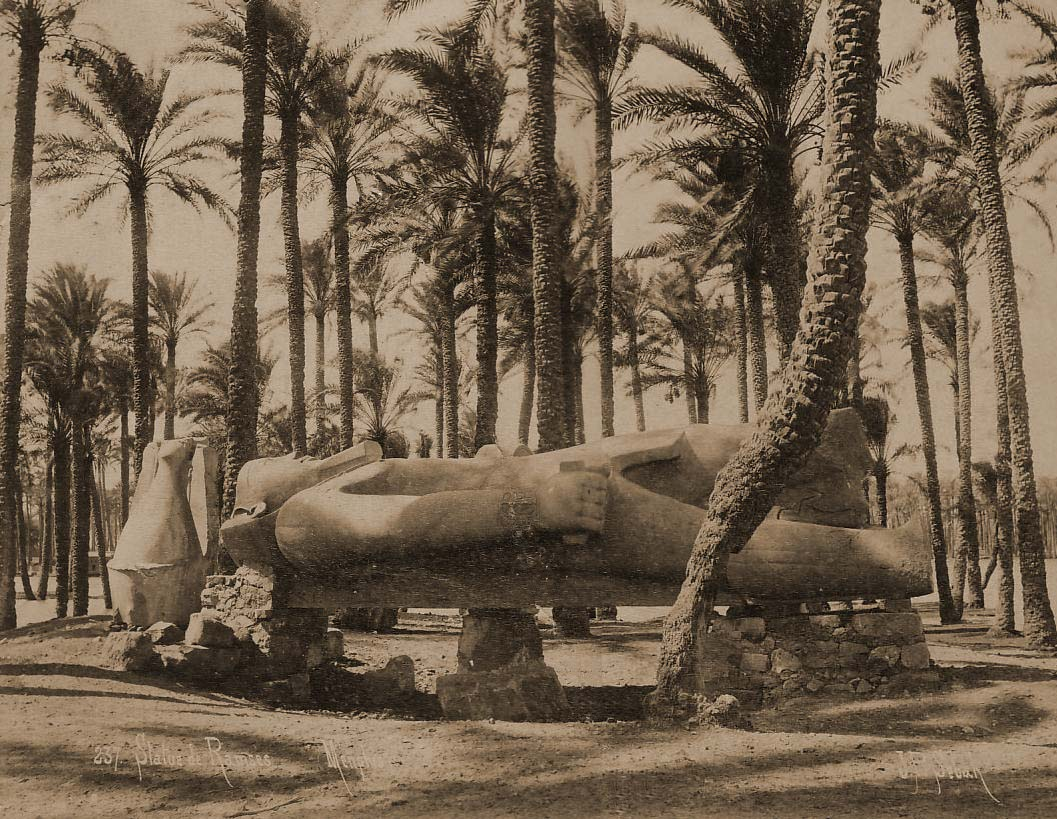
Statue of Rameses, 1880s

== See also ==
- List of Orientalist artists
- Orientalism
