= Thousand Lights metro station =

Chennai Metro's Blue Line metro station

Thousand Lights

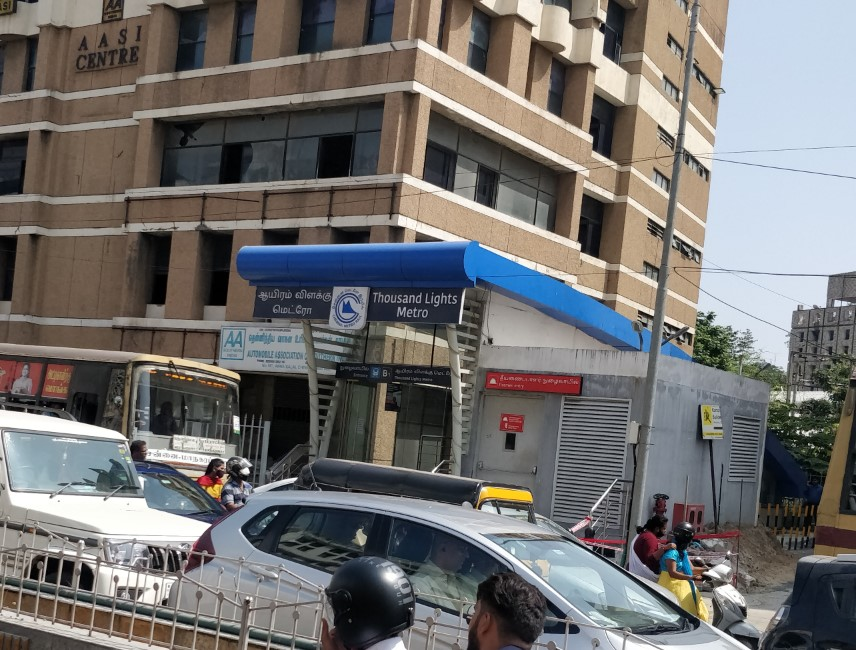
- Entrance B1 of this metro station

General information
- Location: Thousand Lights East, Thousand Lights, Chennai, Tamil Nadu 600006; India
- Coordinates: 13°03′29″N 80°15′26″E
- System: Chennai Metro station
- Owner: Chennai Metro
- Operator: Chennai Metro Rail Limited (CMRL)
- Line: Blue Line Purple Line
- Platforms: Island platform Platform-1 → Chennai International Airport (to be extended to Kilambakkam in the future); Platform-2 → Wimco Nagar Depot; Platform-3 → SIPCOT 2 Platform 4 → Madhavaram Milk Colony
- Tracks: 4

Construction
- Structure type: Underground, Double track
- Parking: No
- Accessible: Yes
- Architectural style: Chennai Metro

Other information
- Station code: STL

History
- Opened: 10 February 2019; 7 years ago
- Electrified: Single phase 25 kV, 50 Hz AC through overhead catenary

Services
Preceding station	Chennai Metro	Following station
LIC towards Wimco Nagar Depot	Blue Line	AG – DMS towards Chennai International Airport
LIC towards Wimco Nagar Depot	Blue Line (Future Service)	AG – DMS towards Kilambakkam
Anna flyover Gemini towards Madhavaram Milk Colony	Purple Line (Future Service)	Royapettah towards Siruseri sipcot 2
Route map
Location

Thousand Lights is an underground metro station on the North-South Corridor of the Blue Line of Chennai Metro in Chennai, India. This station serves the neighbourhoods of Royapettah, Greams Road, and Gopalapuram. The station is named so because of the presence of the Thousand Lights Mosque in the vicinity. The station was opened for public on 10 February 2019. However, some portions of the construction work remains incomplete on the date of inauguration.

== Station layout ==
G	Street level	Exit/Entrance
M	Mezzanine	Fare control, station agent, Ticket/token, shops
P1	Platform 1 Southbound	Towards → Chennai International Airport; Next Station: AG-DMS (to be further extended to Kilambakkam in the future)
P1	Island platform | Doors will open on the right
P1	Platform 2 Northbound	Towards ← Wimco Nagar Depot; Next Station: LIC
P2	Platform 3 Southbound	Towards ← SIPCOT 2 Next Station: Royapettah Government Hospital
P2	Island platform | Doors will open on the right
P2	Platform 4 Northbound	Towards ← Madhavaram Milk Colony; Next Station: Gemini

Thousand Lights metro station
- Interactive map of the Thousand Lights metro station area

General information
- Status: Completed
- Type: Metro station
- Location: Anna Salai, Chennai, India
- Elevation: 10.0 m (32.8 ft)
- Completed: 2019
- Opened: 10 February 2019
- Inaugurated: 10 February 2019

Design and construction
- Main contractor: L&T-SUCG JV

Website
- http://chennaimetrorail.org/

== Connections ==
=== Bus ===
Metropolitan Transport Corporation (Chennai) bus routes number 1A, 1B, 3A, 5C, 11, 11A, 11ACT, 11G, 11H, 18A, 18D, 18E, 18K, 18R, 21, 23C, 23V, 24A, 26, 26B, 26CUT, 26J, 26M, 26R, 27D, 27DGS, 27L, 51J, 51P, 52, 52B, 52K, 52P, 54, 54D, 54M, 60, 60A, 60D, 60H, 88A, 88Ccut, 88K, 88R, 118A, 188, 221, 221H, A51, B18, D51, E18, M51R, T29, serves the station from nearby Anand Theatre bus stand.

== Entry/Exit ==
Thousand Lights metro station Entry/exits
Gate No-A1	Gate No-A2	Gate No-A3	Gate No-A4

== See also ==
- Chennai
- Anna Salai
- List of Chennai metro stations
- Chennai Metro
- Railway stations in Chennai
- Chennai Mass Rapid Transit System
- Chennai Monorail
- Chennai Suburban Railway
- Chennai International Airport
- Transport in Chennai
- Urban rail transit in India
- List of metro systems
