= Tondiarpet metro station =

Chennai Metro's Blue Line metro station

Tondiarpet

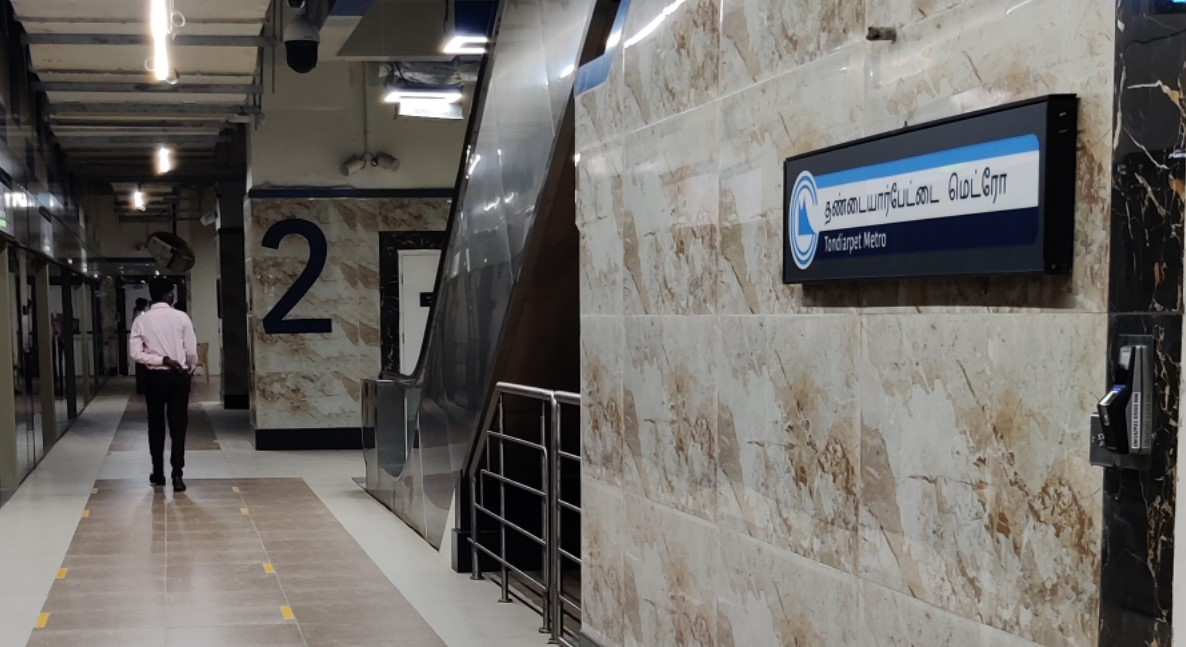
- This metro station captured at platform 2 leading towards Wimco Nagar

General information
- Location: Tondiarpet, Chennai, Tamil Nadu
- Coordinates: 13°07′28″N 80°17′20″E
- System: Chennai Metro station
- Owner: Chennai Metro
- Operator: Chennai Metro Rail Limited (CMRL)
- Line: Blue Line
- Platforms: Island platform Platform-1 → Chennai International Airport (to be extended to Kilambakkam in the future); Platform-2 → Wimco Nagar Depot
- Tracks: 2

Construction
- Structure type: Underground, double track
- Accessible: Yes

Other information
- Station code: STR

History
- Opened: 14 February 2021; 5 years ago
- Electrified: Single-phase 25 kV, 50 Hz AC through overhead catenary

Services
Preceding station	Chennai Metro	Following station
New Washermanpet towards Wimco Nagar Depot	Blue Line	Sir Theagaraya College towards Chennai International Airport
New Washermanpet towards Wimco Nagar Depot	Blue Line (Future Service)	Sir Theagaraya College towards Kilambakkam
Route map
Location

Tondiarpet (formerly known as Korukkupet Metro Station) is an underground metro station on the North-South Corridor of the Line 1 Extension of the Blue Line of Chennai Metro in Chennai, India. This station serves the neighbourhoods of Tondiarpet and other northern suburbs of Chennai.

== Station layout ==
G	Street level	Exit/Entrance
M	Mezzanine	Fare control, station agent, Ticket/token, shops
P	Platform 1 Southbound	Towards → Chennai International Airport; Next Station: Sir Theagaraya College (to be further extended to Kilambakkam in the future)
P	Island platform | Doors will open on the right
P	Platform 2 Northbound	Towards ← Wimco Nagar Depot; Next Station: New Washermanpet

== History ==
The station was opened on 14 February 2021 with the opening of the northern extension of Blue line of Phase I.

== See also ==
- List of Chennai metro stations
- Railway stations in Chennai
