= Teynampet metro station =

Chennai Metro's Blue Line metro station

Teynampet

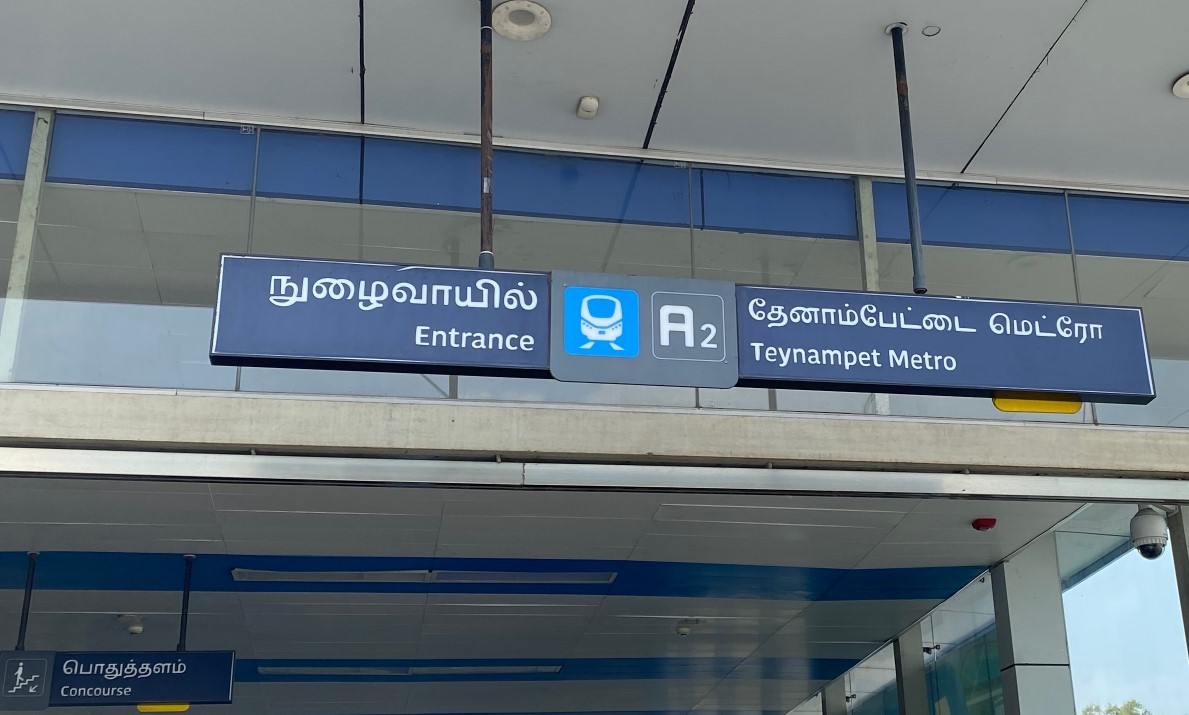
- Teynampet metro station (Entrance A2)

General information
- Location: Teynampet, Chennai, Tamil Nadu 600018; India
- Coordinates: 13°02′14″N 80°14′45″E
- System: Chennai Metro station
- Owner: Chennai Metro
- Operator: Chennai Metro Rail Limited (CMRL)
- Line: Blue Line
- Platforms: Island platform Platform-1 → Chennai International Airport (to be extended to Kilambakkam in the future); Platform-2 → Wimco Nagar Depot
- Tracks: 2

Construction
- Structure type: Underground, double track
- Accessible: Yes
- Architectural style: Chennai Metro

Other information
- Station code: STE

History
- Opened: 25 May 2018; 8 years ago
- Electrified: Single phase 25 kV, 50 Hz AC through overhead catenary

Services
Preceding station	Chennai Metro	Following station
AG – DMS towards Wimco Nagar Depot	Blue Line	Nandanam towards Chennai International Airport
AG – DMS towards Wimco Nagar Depot	Blue Line (future service)	Nandanam towards Kilambakkam
Route map
Location

Teynampet is an underground metro station on the North-South Corridor of the Blue Line of Chennai Metro in Chennai, India. This station serves the neighbourhoods of Teynampet and T. Nagar. It has a length of 230 to 250 meters.

== Station layout ==
G	Street level	Exit/entrance
M	Mezzanine	Fare control, station agent, ticket/token, shops
P	Platform 1 Southbound	Towards → Chennai International Airport; Next station: Nandanam (to be further extended to Kilambakkam in the future)
P	Island platform | Doors will open on the right
P	Platform 2 Northbound	Towards ← Wimco Nagar Depot; Next station: AG-DMS

Teynampet metro station
- Interactive map of the Teynampet metro station area

General information
- Status: Completed
- Type: Metro station
- Location: Chennai, India
- Completed: 2018
- Opened: 25 May 2018

Design and construction
- Main contractor: L&T-SUCG JV

Website
- http://chennaimetrorail.org/

== Connections ==
=== Bus ===
Metropolitan Transport Corporation (Chennai) bus routes number 1B, 18A, 18D, 18E, 18K, 18R, 23C, 23V, 41D, 45B, 45E, 51J, 51P, 52, 52B, 52K, 52P, 54, 54D, 54M, 60, 60A, 60D, 60H, 88Ccut, 88K, 88R, 118A, 188, 221, 221H, A45B, A51, B18, D51, E18, M51R, N45B, serves the station from nearby Teynampet bus stand.

== See also ==
- Anna Salai
- List of Chennai metro stations
- Railway stations in Chennai
- Chennai Mass Rapid Transit System
- Chennai Monorail
- Chennai Suburban Railway
- Chennai International Airport
- Transport in Chennai
- Urban rail transit in India
- List of metro systems
