= Guindy metro station =

Chennai Metro's Blue Line metro station

Guindy

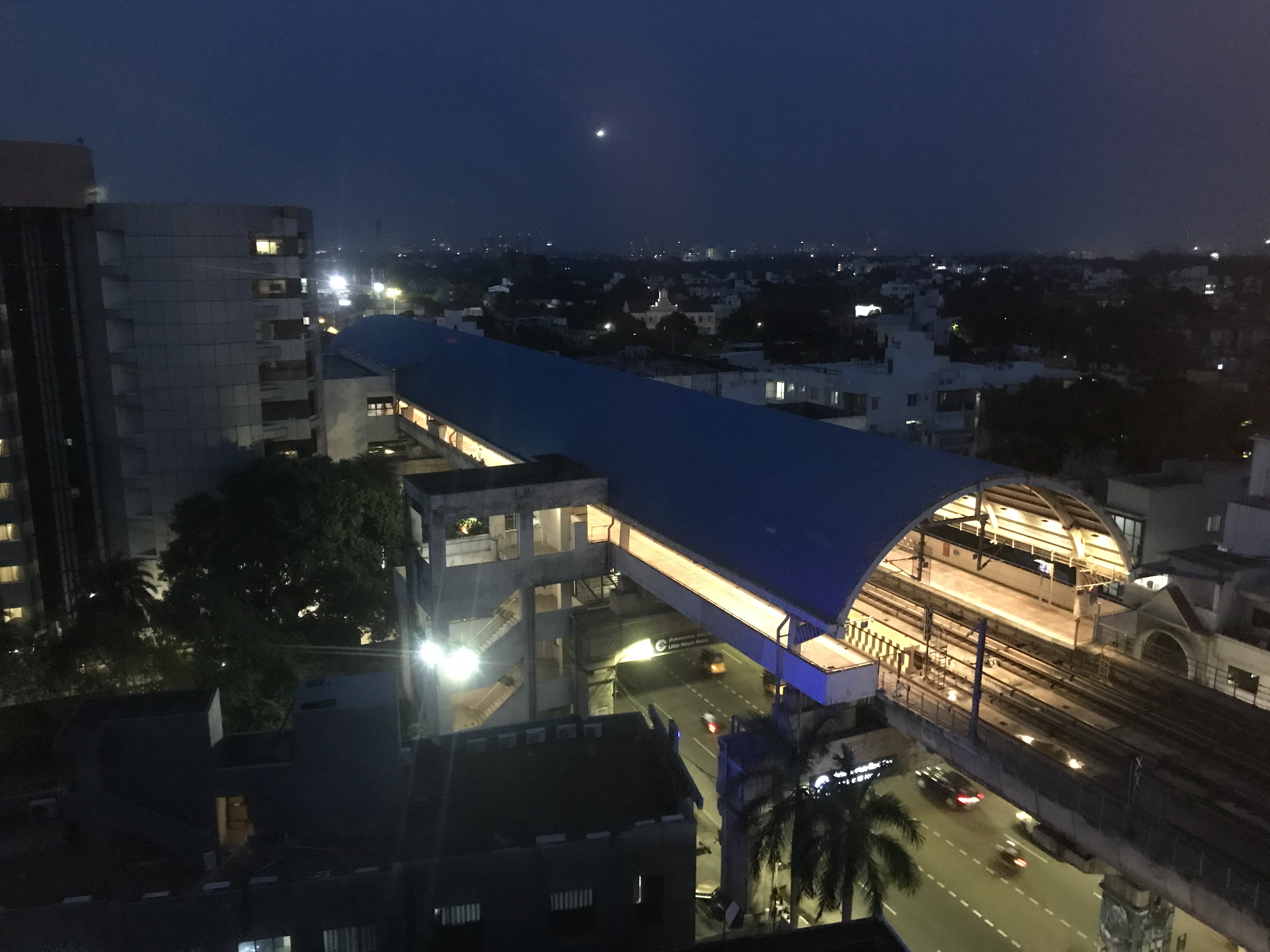

General information
- Location: Guindy Flyover, Race View Colony, Guindy, Chennai, Tamil Nadu 600032
- Coordinates: 13.009262°N 80.213189°E
- System: Chennai Metro station
- Owner: Chennai Metro
- Operator: Chennai Metro Rail Limited (CMRL)
- Line: Blue Line
- Platforms: Side platform Platform-1 → Chennai International Airport (to be extended to Kilambakkam in the future); Platform-2 → Wimco Nagar Depot
- Tracks: 2
- Connections: Guindy

Construction
- Structure type: Elevated, Double track
- Accessible: Yes

Other information
- Station code: SGU

History
- Opened: 21 September 2016; 10 years ago
- Electrified: Single-phase 25 kV, 50 Hz AC through overhead catenary

Services
Preceding station	Chennai Metro	Following station
Little Mount towards Wimco Nagar Depot	Blue Line	Alandur towards Chennai International Airport
Out-of-system interchange
Little Mount towards Wimco Nagar Depot	Blue Line (Future Service)	Alandur towards Kilambakkam
Preceding station	Chennai Suburban	Following station
Saidapet towards Chennai Beach	South Line transfer at Guindy	St. Thomas Mount towards Tambaram, Chengalpattu Junction or Villupuram Junction
Route map
Location

Guindy is an elevated metro station on the North-South Corridor of the Blue Line of Chennai Metro in Chennai, India, which opened on 21 September 2016. This station will serve the neighbourhoods of Guindy and Velachery.

== The station ==
The 105-metre-long steel girder rail overbridge, which is the only such structure in the entire Chennai Metro system, lies near the station.

The station is also the only one in the entire system that will have two skywalks providing access to the station—one near the Guindy Industrial Estate and the other near Race Course Road.

== Station layout ==
G	Street level	Exit/Entrance
L1	Mezzanine	Fare control, station agent, Metro Card vending machines, crossover
L2	Side platform | Doors will open on the left
L2	Platform 1 Southbound	Towards → Chennai International Airport; Next Station: Arignar Anna Alandur Change at the next station for Green Line (to be further extended to Kilambakkam in the future)
L2	Platform 2 Northbound	Towards ← Wimco Nagar Depot; Next Station: Little Mount
L2	Side platform | Doors will open on the left
L2

== See also ==
- List of Chennai metro stations
- Chennai Metro
- Chennai International Airport
