= Tiruvottiyur (disambiguation) =

Tiruvottiyur is a neighbourhood in North Chennai, Chennai, India.

Tiruvottiyur may also refer to these related to the neighbourhood:

- Tiruvottiyur (State Assembly Constituency)
- Tiruvottiyur taluk, subdistrict of Chennai
- Tiruvottiyur railway station
- Tiruvottriyur metro station
- Tiruvottriyur Theradi metro station, Chennai Metro
- Tiruvottriyur Tyagayyar, Indian Carnatic composer
