= Saidapet metro station =

Chennai Metro's Blue Line metro station

Saidapet

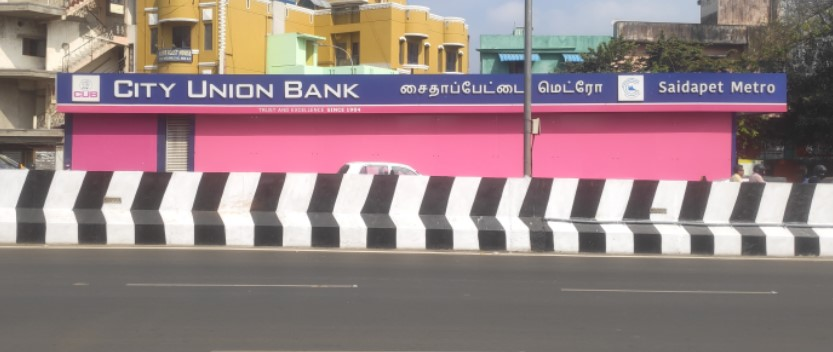
- Saidapet metro station with City Union Bank

General information
- Location: Anna Salai, Todd Hunter Nagar, Nandanam, Chennai, Tamil Nadu 600015; India
- Coordinates: 13°01′17″N 80°13′32″E
- System: Chennai Metro station
- Owner: Chennai Metro
- Operator: Chennai Metro Rail Limited (CMRL)
- Line: Blue Line
- Platforms: Island platform Platform-1 → Chennai International Airport (to be extended to Kilambakkam in the future); Platform-2 → Wimco Nagar Depot
- Tracks: 2

Construction
- Structure type: Underground, Double Track
- Parking: Available
- Accessible: Yes
- Architectural style: Chennai Metro

Other information
- Station code: SSA

History
- Opened: 25 May 2018; 8 years ago
- Electrified: Single phase 25 kV, 50 Hz AC through overhead catenary

Services
Preceding station	Chennai Metro	Following station
Nandanam towards Wimco Nagar Depot	Blue Line	Little Mount towards Chennai International Airport
Nandanam towards Wimco Nagar Depot	Blue Line (Future Service)	Little Mount towards Kilambakkam
Route map
Location

Saidapet is an underground metro station on the North-South Corridor of the Blue Line of Chennai Metro in Chennai, India. This station serves the neighbourhood of Saidapet. The station has a length of 230 to 250 meters. The station was opened for public on 25 May 2018.

== Interesting facts ==
The station became the first station in Chennai Metro to have solar panels installed. A total of 400 KW panels have been installed in the station to power elevators, escalators, and lights at the station.

== Station layout ==
G	Street level	Exit/Entrance
M	Mezzanine	Fare control, station agent, Ticket/token, shops
P	Platform 1 Southbound	Towards → Chennai International Airport; Next Station: Little Mount (to be further extended to Kilambakkam in the future)
P	Island platform | Doors will open on the right
P	Platform 2 Northbound	Towards ← Wimco Nagar Depot; Next Station: Nandanam

Saidapet metro station
- Interactive map of the Saidapet metro station area

General information
- Status: Completed
- Type: Metro station
- Location: Chennai, India
- Completed: 2018
- Opened: 25 May 2018

Design and construction
- Main contractor: L&T-SUCG JV

Website
- http://chennaimetrorail.org/

=== Facilities ===
List of available ATM at Saidapet metro station are

== Connections ==
=== Bus ===
Metropolitan Transport Corporation (Chennai) bus routes number 1B, 5A, 5B, 5E, 5T, 9M, 18A, 18D, 18E, 18R, 19A, 19BCT, 19C, 19T, 23C, 23V, 29N, 45A, 45B, 45E, 47, 47A, 47D, 49G, 49R, 51F, 51J, 51M, 51N, 51P, 52, 52B, 52K, 52P, 54, 54D, 54E, 54M, 54P, 54S, 60, 60A, 60D, 60H, 88CET, 88Ccut, 88D, 88K, 88L, 88R, 118A, 119T, 129C, 154, 154A, 154P, 188, 188K, 221, 221H, 519, 554, 597, A45B, A47, A51, B18, B29NGS, D51, E18, G18, J51, M7, M7A, M9M, M18C, M19B, M45E, M51, M51R, M51V, M60, N45B, S35, V51, V51CUT, V151, serves the station from nearby Saidapet Police Station bus stand.

=== Rail ===
Saidapet railway station of Chennai Suburban Railway network is situated nearby.

== Entry/Exit ==
Saidapet metro station Entry/exits
Gate No-A1	Gate No-A2	Gate No-A3	Gate No-A4

== See also ==
- Chennai
- Anna Salai
- List of Chennai metro stations
- Chennai Metro
- Railway stations in Chennai
- Chennai Mass Rapid Transit System
- Chennai Monorail
- Chennai Suburban Railway
- Chennai International Airport
- Transport in Chennai
- Urban rail transit in India
- List of metro systems
