= Little Mount metro station =

Chennai Metro's Blue Line metro station

Little Mount

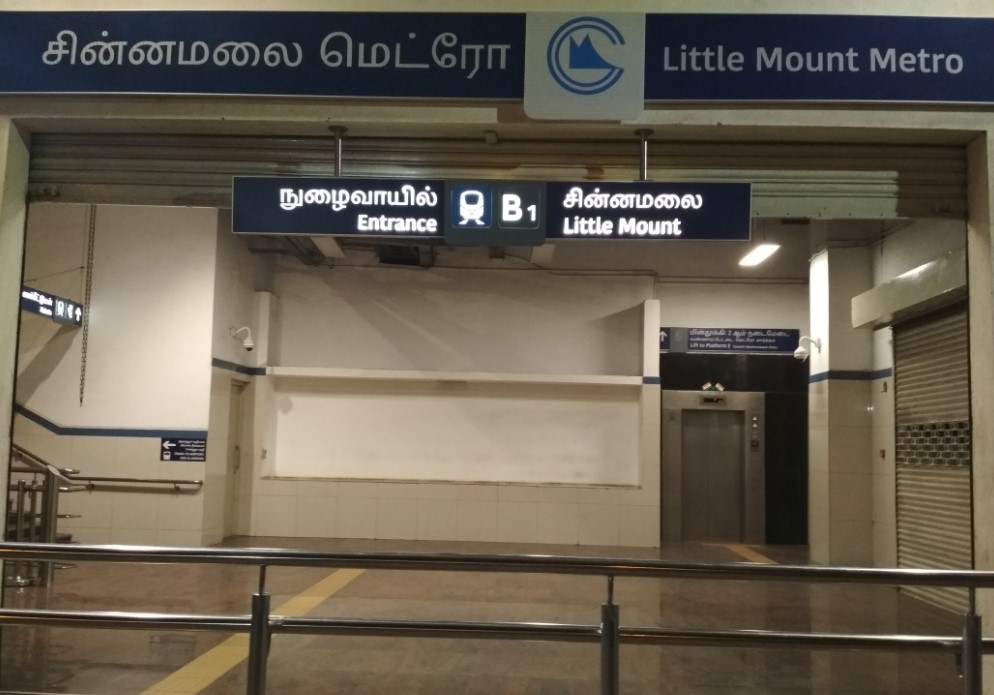
- Little Mount metro station (Entrance B1)

General information
- Location: West Saidapet, Chennai, Tamil Nadu 600015
- Coordinates: 13°00′53″N 80°13′22″E
- System: Chennai Metro station
- Owner: Chennai Metro
- Operator: Chennai Metro Rail Limited (CMRL)
- Line: Blue Line
- Platforms: Side platform Platform-1 → Chennai International Airport (to be extended to Kilambakkam in the future); Platform-2 → Wimco Nagar Depot
- Tracks: 2

Construction
- Structure type: Elevated, Double track
- Parking: Available
- Cycle facilities: Yes
- Accessible: Yes
- Architectural style: Chennai Metro

Other information
- Station code: SLM

History
- Opened: 21 September 2016; 9 years ago
- Electrified: Single phase 25 kV, 50 Hz AC through overhead catenary

Services
Preceding station	Chennai Metro	Following station
Saidapet towards Wimco Nagar Depot	Blue Line	Guindy towards Chennai International Airport
Saidapet towards Wimco Nagar Depot	Blue Line (Future Service)	Guindy towards Kilambakkam
Route map
Location

Little Mount is an elevated metro station on the North-South Corridor of the Blue Line of Chennai Metro in Chennai, India. This station serves the neighbourhoods of Guindy and Saidapet.

== Station layout ==
G	Street level	Exit/Entrance
L1	Mezzanine	Fare control, station agent, Metro Card vending machines, crossover
L2	Side platform | Doors will open on the left
L2	Platform 1 Southbound	Towards → Chennai International Airport; Next Station: Guindy (to be further extended to Kilambakkam in the future)
L2	Platform 2 Northbound	Towards ← Wimco Nagar Depot; Next Station: Saidapet
L2	Side platform | Doors will open on the left
L2

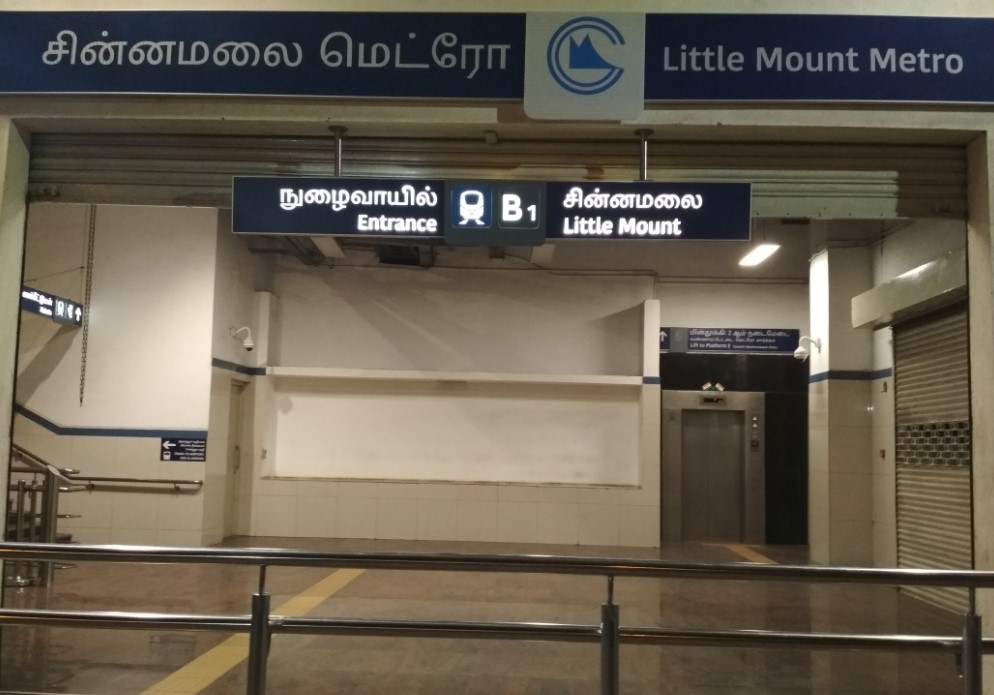

Little Mount metro station
- Interactive map of the Little Mount metro station area

General information
- Status: Completed
- Type: Metro station
- Location: Chennai, India
- Elevation: 11 m (36 ft)
- Completed: 2016
- Opened: 21 September 2016

Design and construction
- Main contractor: L&T-SUCG JV

Website
- http://chennaimetrorail.org/

== Facilities ==
List of available ATM at Little Mount metro station are

== Connections ==
=== Bus ===
Metropolitan Transport Corporation (Chennai) bus routes number 1B, 5A, 5B, 5E, 9M, 14MET, 18A, 18D, 18E, 18R, 19A, 19B, 19BCT, 19C, 19T, 23C, 23V, 29N, 45A, 45B, 45E, 47, 47A, 47D, 51B, 51E, 51F, 51J, 51M, 51N, 52, 52B, 52K, 52P, 54, 54B, 54D, 54E, 54G, 54K, 54L, 54M, 54P, 54S, 54T, 60, 60A, 60D, 60H, 65A, 88C, 88CCT, 88CET, 88D, 88K, 88KCT, 88L, 88R, 118A, 119G, 119T, 129C, 151, 154, 154A, 154P, 188, 188K, 221, 221H, 519, 554, 570, 570AC, 570P, 570X, 597, A45B, A47, A51, B18, B29NGS, D51, E18, G18, J51, M7, M9M, M18C, M19B, M45E, M51, M51D, M51R, M51V, M60, N45B, S35, V51, V51CUT, V151, serves the station from nearby Little Mount bus stand.

== Entry/Exit ==
Little Mount metro station Entry/exits
Gate No-A1	Gate No-A2	Gate No-A3	Gate No-A4

== See also ==
- Chennai
- Anna Salai
- List of Chennai metro stations
- Chennai Metro
- Railway stations in Chennai
- Chennai Mass Rapid Transit System
- Chennai Monorail
- Chennai Suburban Railway
- Chennai International Airport
- Transport in Chennai
- Urban rail transit in India
- List of metro systems
