= AG – DMS metro station =

Chennai Metro's Blue Line metro station

AG – DMS

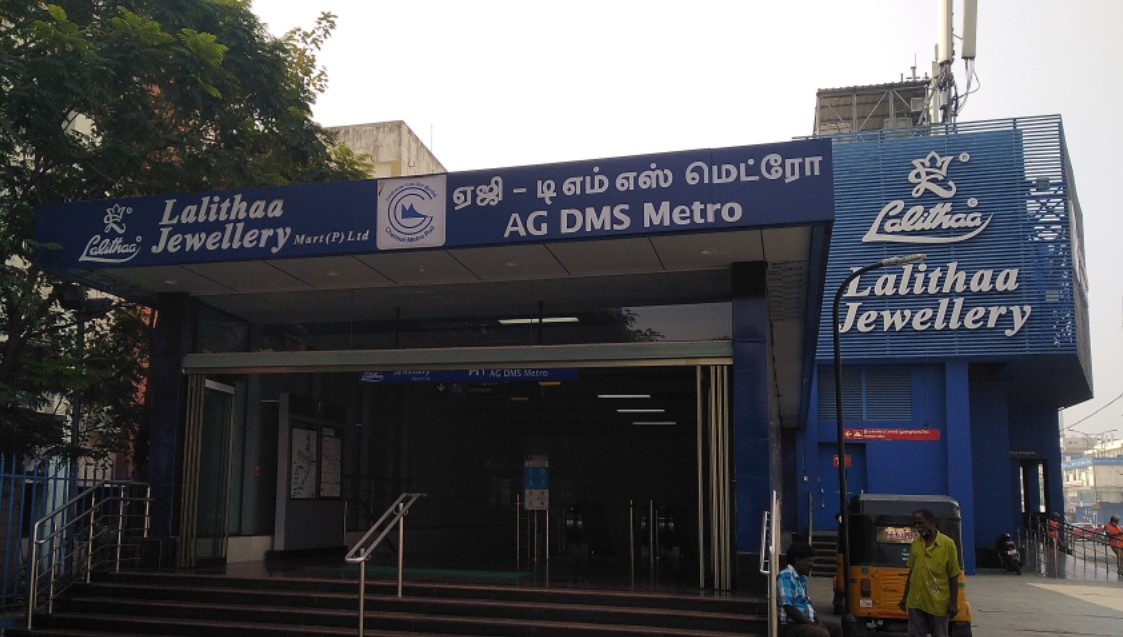

General information
- Location: Chokkalingam Nagar, Teynampet, Chennai, Tamil Nadu 600086; India
- Coordinates: 13°02′41″N 80°14′53″E
- System: Chennai Metro station
- Owner: Chennai Metro
- Operator: Chennai Metro Rail Limited (CMRL)
- Line: Blue Line
- Platforms: Island platform Platform-1 → Chennai International Airport (to be extended to Kilambakkam in the future); Platform-2 → Wimco Nagar Depot
- Tracks: 2

Construction
- Structure type: Underground, Double track
- Parking: No
- Accessible: Yes

Other information
- Station code: SGM

History
- Opened: 25 May 2018; 8 years ago
- Electrified: Single-phase 25 kV, 50 Hz AC through overhead catenary

Services
Preceding station	Chennai Metro	Following station
Thousand Lights towards Wimco Nagar Depot	Blue Line	Teynampet towards Chennai International Airport
Thousand Lights towards Wimco Nagar Depot	Blue Line (Future Service)	Teynampet towards Kilambakkam
Route map
Location

AG – DMS is an underground metro station on the North-South Corridor of the Blue Line of Chennai Metro in Chennai, India. This station serves the neighbourhoods of Teynampet and T. Nagar.

== Etymology ==
The station is so named because of the presence of the Accountant General's (AG) Office and the office of the Directorate of Medical and Rural Health Services (DMS) in the vicinity.

== The station ==
The station has a length of 380 meters. It is one of the two stations in Phase I of Chennai Metro, the other being the Puratchi Thalaivar Dr. M.G. Ramachandran Central metro station, that measure a length of 380 meters or more. The station was opened for public on 25 May 2018.

=== Station layout ===
G	Street level	Exit/Entrance
M	Mezzanine	Fare control, station agent, Ticket/token, shops
P	Platform 1 Southbound	Towards → Chennai International Airport; Next Station: Teynampet (to be further extended to Kilambakkam in the future)
P	Island platform | Doors will open on the right
P	Platform 2 Northbound	Towards ← Wimco Nagar Depot; Next Station: Thousand Lights

=== Facilities ===
List of available ATM at AAG – DMS metro station are

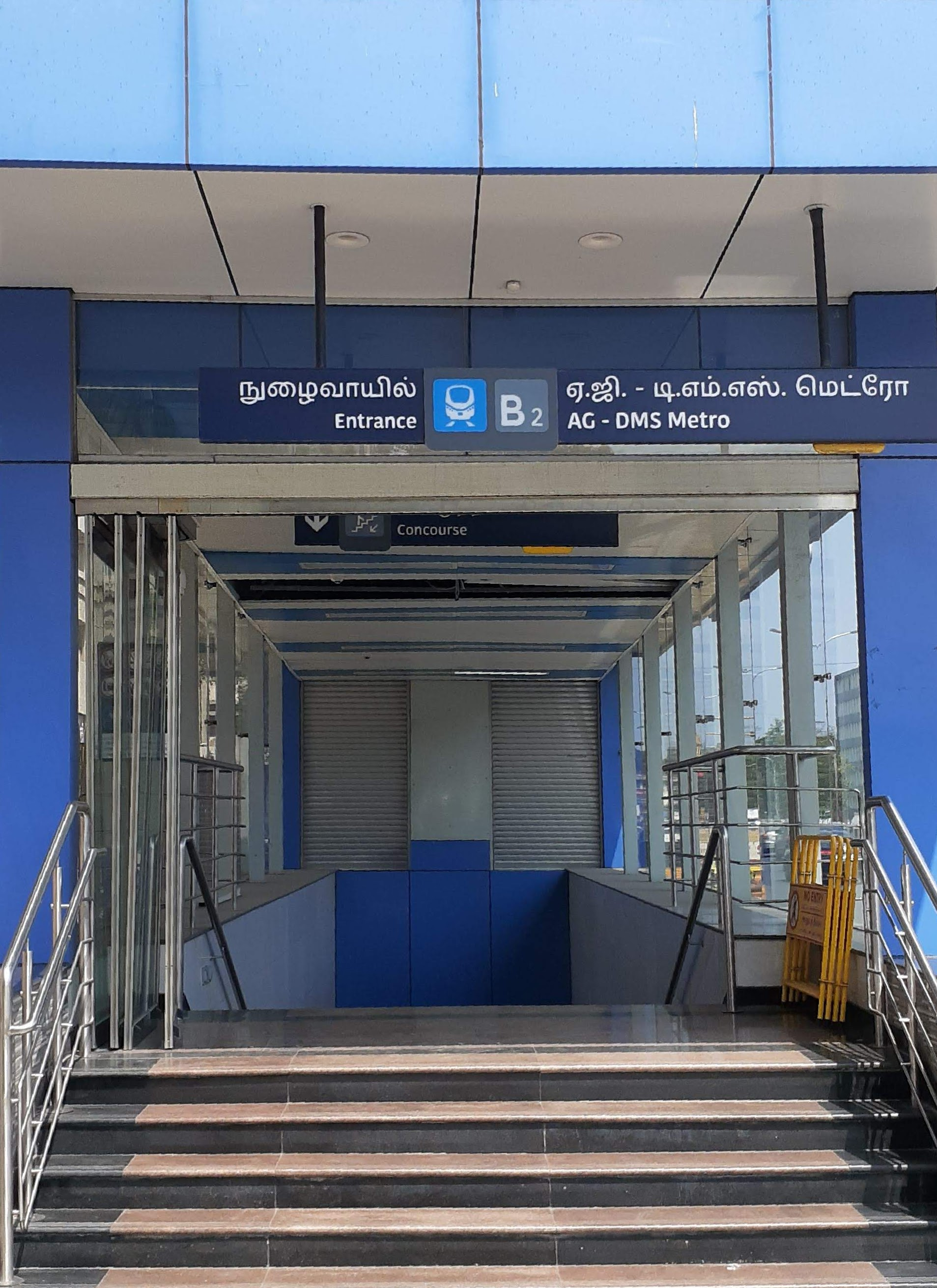
One of the Entrances, AG – DMS metro station, Chennai, Tamil Nadu, India.

== Connections ==
=== Bus ===
Metropolitan Transport Corporation (Chennai) bus routes number 1B, 11A, 11ACT, 11G, 11H, 13B, 18A, 18D, 18E, 18K, 18R, 23C, 23V, 29N, 41C, 41D, 41F, 51J, 51P, 52, 52B, 52K, 52P, 54, 54D, 54M, 60, 60A, 60D, 60H, 88Ccut, 88K, 88R, 118A, 188, 221, 221H, A51, B18, B29NGS, D51, E18, M51R, serves the station from nearby DMS bus stand.

== Entry/Exit ==
AG – DMS metro station Entry/exits
Gate No-A1	Gate No-A2	Gate No-A3	Gate No-A4
DMS			

== See also ==
- Chennai
- Anna Salai
- List of Chennai metro stations
- Chennai Metro
- Railway stations in Chennai
- Chennai Mass Rapid Transit System
- Chennai Monorail
- Chennai Suburban Railway
- Chennai International Airport
- Transport in Chennai
- Urban rail transit in India
- List of metro systems
