= LIC metro station =

Chennai Metro's Blue Line metro station

LIC

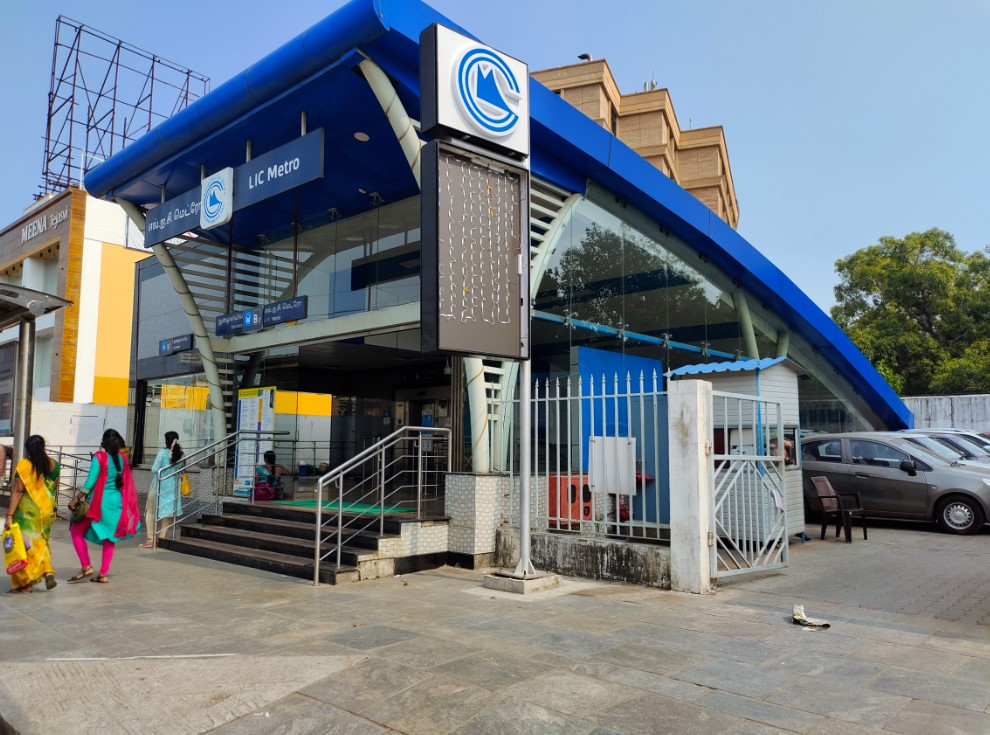

General information
- Location: Chennai – Trichy Hwy, Anna Salai, Triplicane, Chennai, Tamil Nadu 600002; India
- Coordinates: 13°03′52″N 80°15′57″E
- System: Chennai Metro station
- Owner: Chennai Metro
- Operator: Chennai Metro Rail Limited (CMRL)
- Line: Blue Line
- Platforms: Island platform Platform-1 → Chennai International Airport (to be extended to Kilambakkam in the future); Platform-2 → Wimco Nagar Depot
- Tracks: 2

Construction
- Structure type: Underground, Double Track
- Parking: No
- Accessible: Yes
- Architectural style: Chennai Metro

Other information
- Station code: SLI

History
- Opened: 10 February 2019; 7 years ago
- Electrified: Single phase 25 kV, 50 Hz AC through overhead catenary

Services
Preceding station	Chennai Metro	Following station
Government Estate towards Wimco Nagar Depot	Blue Line	Thousand Lights towards Chennai International Airport
Government Estate towards Wimco Nagar Depot	Blue Line (Future Service)	Thousand Lights towards Kilambakkam
Route map
Location

LIC is an underground metro station on the North-South Corridor of the Blue Line of Chennai Metro in Chennai, India. This station serves the neighbourhoods of Egmore and Royapettah. The station is named so because of the presence of the LIC Building, the city's first skyscraper, in the vicinity. The station was opened for public on 10 February 2019. However, some portions of the construction work remains incomplete on the date of inauguration.

== Station layout ==
G	Street level	Exit/Entrance
M	Mezzanine	Fare control, station agent, Ticket/token, shops
P	Platform 1 Southbound	Towards → Chennai International Airport; Next Station: Thousand Lights (to be further extended to Kilambakkam in the future)
P	Island platform | Doors will open on the right
P	Platform 2 Northbound	Towards ← Wimco Nagar Depot; Next Station: Government Estate

LIC metro station
- Interactive map of the LIC metro station area

General information
- Status: Completed
- Type: Metro station
- Location: Anna Salai, Chennai, India
- Elevation: 10.0 m (32.8 ft)
- Completed: 2019
- Opened: 10 February 2019
- Inaugurated: 10 February 2019

Design and construction
- Main contractor: L&T-SUCG JV

Website
- http://chennaimetrorail.org/

== See also ==
- Chennai
- Anna Salai
- List of Chennai metro stations
- Chennai Metro
- Railway stations in Chennai
- Chennai Mass Rapid Transit System
- Chennai Monorail
- Chennai Suburban Railway
- Chennai International Airport
- Transport in Chennai
- Urban rail transit in India
- List of metro systems
