= Nanganallur Road metro station =

Chennai Metro's Blue Line metro station

OTA-Nanganallur Road

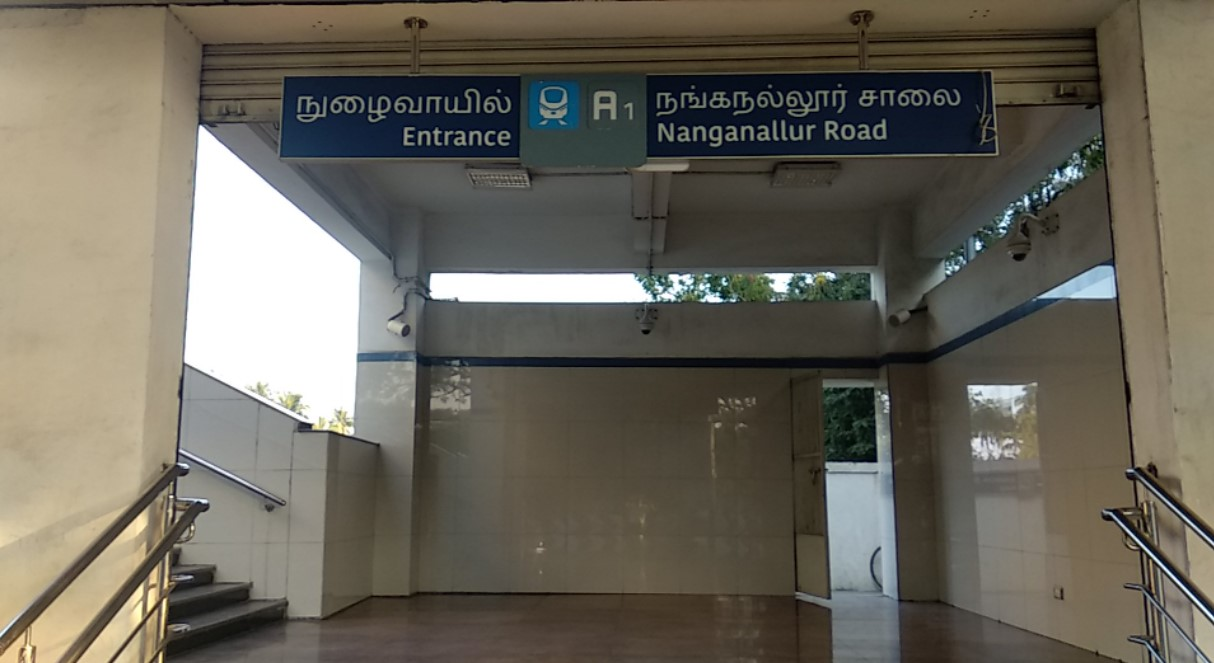
- OTA-Nanganallur Road metro station (Entrance A1)

General information
- Location: Mathas Nagar, St. Thomas Mount, Tamil Nadu 600016; India
- Coordinates: 12.999843°N 80.193975°E
- System: Chennai Metro station
- Owner: Chennai Metro
- Operator: Chennai Metro Rail Limited (CMRL)
- Line: Blue Line Inter Corridor Line
- Platforms: Side platform Platform-1 → Chennai International Airport (to be extended to Kilambakkam in the future); Platform-2 → Wimco Nagar Depot
- Tracks: 2

Construction
- Structure type: Elevated, Double track
- Accessible: Yes

Other information
- Station code: SOT

History
- Opened: 21 September 2016; 9 years ago
- Electrified: Single-phase 25 kV, 50 Hz AC through overhead catenary

Services
Preceding station	Chennai Metro	Following station
Alandur towards Wimco Nagar Depot	Blue Line	Meenambakkam towards Chennai International Airport
Alandur towards Wimco Nagar Depot	Blue Line (Future Service)	Meenambakkam towards Kilambakkam
Route map
Location

OTA-Nanganallur Road is an elevated metro station on the North-South Corridor of the Blue Line of Chennai Metro in Chennai, India. This station serves the neighbourhoods of Alandur, Nanganallur and St. Thomas Mount, among others.

== Construction ==
The construction work of the station was awarded to URC Construction Company Private Limited, Erode.

== The station ==
The station is located near Officers Training Academy where the stretch between the station and the Meenambakkam station dips below the ground for a brief distance to negotiate the air funnel area of the second runway of the airport.

== Station layout ==
G	Street level	Exit/Entrance
L1	Mezzanine	Fare control, station agent, Metro Card vending machines, crossover
L2	Side platform | Doors will open on the left
L2	Platform 1 Southbound	Towards → Chennai International Airport; Next Station: Meenambakkam (to be further extended to Kilambakkam in the future)
L2	Platform 2 Northbound	Towards ← Wimco Nagar Depot; Next Station: Arignar Anna Alandur Change at the next station for Green Line
L2	Side platform | Doors will open on the left
L2

== See also ==
- List of Chennai metro stations
- Chennai Metro
- Chennai International Airport
