= Sir Theagaraya College metro station =

Chennai Metro's Blue Line metro station

Sir Theagaraya College

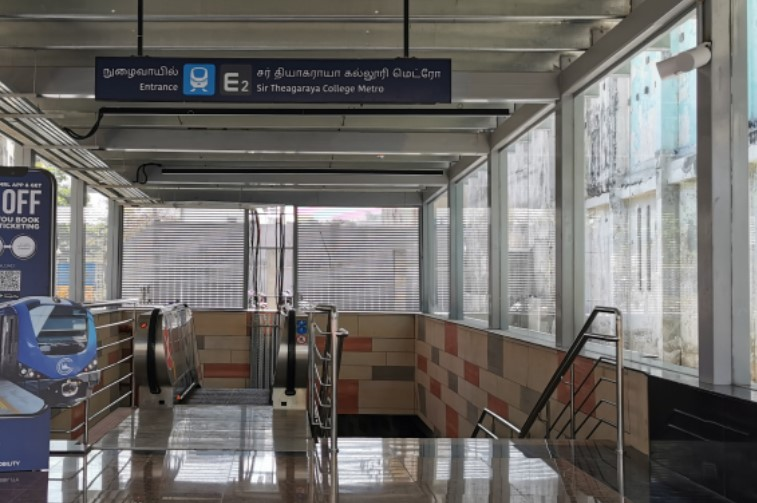

General information
- Location: Old Washermanpet, Chennai, Tamil Nadu
- Coordinates: 13°06′57″N 80°17′05″E
- System: Chennai Metro station
- Owner: Chennai Metro
- Operator: Chennai Metro Rail Limited (CMRL)
- Line: Blue Line
- Platforms: Island platform Platform-1 → Chennai International Airport (to be extended to Kilambakkam in the future); Platform-2 → Wimco Nagar Depot
- Tracks: 2

Construction
- Structure type: Underground, Double track
- Accessible: Yes

Other information
- Station code: STC

History
- Opened: 14 February 2021; 5 years ago
- Electrified: Single-phase 25 kV, 50 Hz AC through overhead catenary

Services
Preceding station	Chennai Metro	Following station
Tondiarpet towards Wimco Nagar Depot	Blue Line	Washermanpet towards Chennai International Airport
Tondiarpet towards Wimco Nagar Depot	Blue Line (Future Service)	Washermanpet towards Kilambakkam
Route map
Location

Sir Theagaraya College is an underground station on the North-South Corridor of Line 1's Blue Line Extension of Chennai Metro in Chennai, India. This station will serve the neighbourhoods of Old Washermanpet and other northern suburbs of Chennai.

== History ==
The station was inaugurated on February 14, 2021, with the inauguration of the Phase I northern extension of the Blue Line. The station is named after Sir Theagaraya College, located in the locality.

== Station layout ==
G	Street level	Exit/Entrance
M	Mezzanine	Fare control, station agent, Ticket/token, shops
P	Platform 1 Southbound	Towards → Chennai International Airport; Next Station: Washermanpet (to be further extended to Kilambakkam in the future)
P	Island platform | Doors will open on the right
P	Platform 2 Northbound	Towards ← Wimco Nagar Depot; Next Station: Tondiarpet

== See also ==
- Chennai
- List of Chennai metro stations
- Railway stations in Chennai
