= Washermanpet metro station =

Chennai Metro's Blue Line metro station

Washermanpet

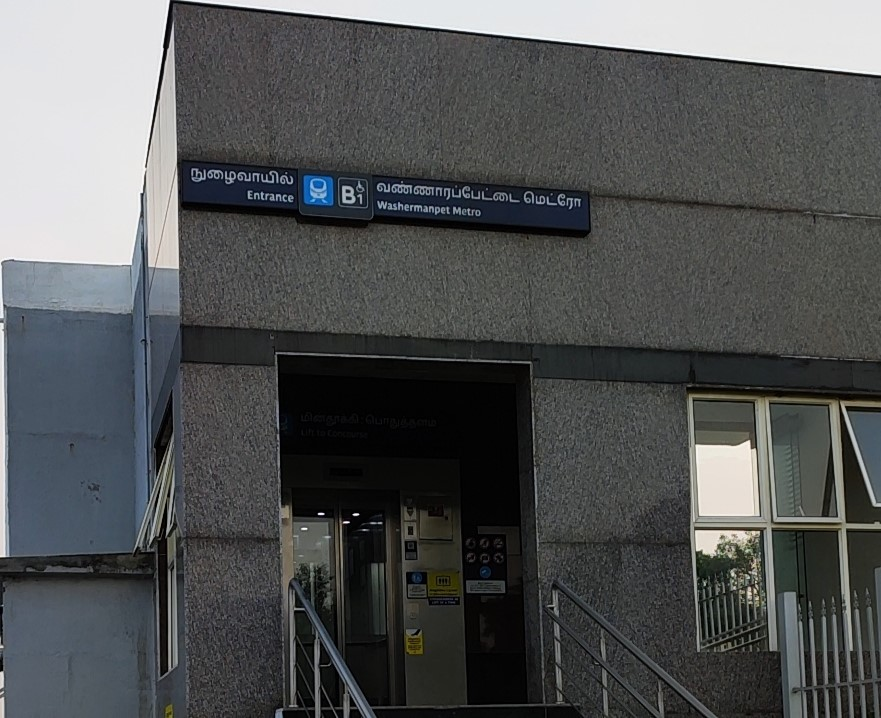

General information
- Location: Washermanpet Chennai, Tamil Nadu
- Coordinates: 13°06′28″N 80°16′50″E
- System: Chennai Metro station
- Owner: Chennai Metro
- Operator: Chennai Metro Rail Limited (CMRL)
- Line: Blue Line
- Platforms: Island platform Platform-1 → Chennai International Airport (to be extended to Kilambakkam in the future); Platform-2 → Wimco Nagar Depot
- Tracks: 2
- Connections: Washermanpet; MTC (Vallalar Nagar Mint bus terminus)

Construction
- Structure type: Underground, Double track
- Platform levels: 2
- Accessible: Yes

Other information
- Station code: SWA

History
- Opened: 10 February 2019; 7 years ago
- Electrified: Single-phase 25 kV, 50 Hz AC through overhead catenary

Services
Preceding station	Chennai Metro	Following station
Sir Theagaraya College towards Wimco Nagar Depot	Blue Line	Mannadi towards Chennai International Airport
Sir Theagaraya College towards Wimco Nagar Depot	Blue Line (Future Service)	Mannadi towards Kilambakkam
Route map
Location

Washermanpet is an underground metro station on the North-South Corridor of the Blue Line of Chennai Metro in Chennai, India. This station serves the neighbourhoods of Washermanpet and Royapuram.

== Station layout ==
G	Street level	Exit/Entrance
M	Mezzanine	Fare control, station agent, Ticket/token, shops
P	Platform 1 Southbound	Towards → Chennai International Airport; Next Station: Mannadi (to be further extended to Kilambakkam in the future)
P	Island platform | Doors will open on the right
P	Platform 2 Northbound	Towards ← Wimco Nagar Depot; Next Station: Sir Theagaraya College

=== Facilities ===
List of available ATM at Washermanpet metro station are

== Connectivity ==
=== Bus ===
- Mint (Vallalar Nagar) Bus Terminus

=== Rail ===
- Washermanpet railway station

== Entry/Exit ==
Washermanpet Metro Entry/exits
Gate No-A1	Gate No-A2	Gate No- B1, B2	Gate No- B3
Dhakshinamurthy Road	Washermanpet railway station (Suburban)	Mint Bus Terminus	Dr. Vijayaragavalu Road

== See also ==
- Chennai
- Washermanpet railway station
- Washermanpet
- List of Chennai metro stations
- Chennai Metro
- Railway stations in Chennai
- Chennai Mass Rapid Transit System
- Chennai Monorail
- Chennai Suburban Railway
- Transport in Chennai
- Urban rail transit in India
- List of metro systems
