= List of Chennai Metro stations =

Chennai Metro Phase-I & II operational lines

The Chennai Metro is a rapid transit system serving the city of Chennai and its suburbs. Phase I of the project consisted of two corridors covering a length of 54.15 kilometres (33.65 mi). The elevated section of the project began operations in June 2015, with the entire elevated stretch operational as of October 2016. The entire project was completed within the financial year 2019–2020. About 55% of the corridors in Phase I are underground and the remaining corridors are elevated. Phase II is currently under construction.

== Metro stations ==
=== Operational ===
†	Terminal station
*	Transfer station to other lines
†*	Transfer station to Chennai Suburban
**	Terminal and transfer station to Chennai Suburban
††	Terminal and transfer station to Chennai MRTS and Chennai Suburban
*#	Transfer station to Chennai Suburban and Indian Railways
†¤	Terminal, transfer station to other lines, Chennai Suburban, Chennai MRTS and Indian Railways

Station name		Line	Opened	Layout	Notes	Refs
English	Tamil	Line	Opened	Layout	Notes	Refs
AG – DMS	ஏ.ஜி. – டி.எம்.எஸ்.	Blue Line	25 May 2018	Underground	–	
Anna Nagar East	அண்ணா நகர் கிழக்கு	Green Line	14 May 2017	Underground	–	
Anna Nagar Tower	அண்ணா நகர் கோபுரம்	Green Line	14 May 2017	Underground	–	
Arignar Anna Alandur*	அறிஞர் அண்ணா ஆலந்தூர்	Blue Line; Green Line	21 September 2016; 29 June 2015	Elevated	Interchange station of Blue Line and Green Line	
Arumbakkam	அரும்பாக்கம்	Green Line	29 June 2015	Elevated	–	
Ashok Nagar	அசோக் நகர்	Green Line	29 June 2015	Elevated	–	
Chennai International Airport*	சென்னை பன்னாட்டு விமான நிலையம்	Blue Line	21 September 2016	Elevated	Transfer station for: Tirusulam (Chennai Suburban)	
Egmore*#	எழும்பூர்	Green Line	25 May 2018	Underground	Transfer station for: Chennai Egmore (Indian Railways and Chennai Suburban)	
Ekkattuthangal	ஈக்காட்டுத்தாங்கல்	Green Line	29 June 2015	Elevated	–	
Government Estate	அரசினர் தோட்டம்	Blue Line	10 February 2019	Underground	–	
Guindy†*	கிண்டி	Blue Line	21 September 2016	Elevated	Transfer station for: Guindy (Chennai Suburban)	
High Court	உயர் நீதிமன்றம்	Blue Line	10 February 2019	Underground	–	
Iyyapanthangal	அய்யப்பன் தாங்கல்	Yellow Line	11 October 2026	Elevated	-	
Kaladipet	காலடிபேட்டை	Blue Line	14 February 2021	Elevated	–	
Karayanchavadi	கரையான்சாவடி	Yellow Line	11 October 2026	Elevated	-	
Kattupakkam	காட்டுப்பாக்கம்	Yellow Line	11 October 2026	Elevated	-	
Kilpauk	கீழ்ப்பாக்கம்	Green Line	14 May 2017	Underground	–	
Koyambedu	கோயம்பேடு	Green Line	29 June 2015	Elevated	–	
Kumananchavadi	குமணன்சாவடி	Yellow Line	11 October 2026	Elevated		
LIC	எல். ஐ. சி.	Blue Line	10 February 2019	Underground	–	
Little Mount	சின்னமலை	Blue Line	21 September 2016	Elevated	–	
Mannadi	மண்ணடி	Blue Line	10 February 2019	Underground	–	
Meenambakkam	மீனம்பாக்கம்	Blue Line	21 September 2016	Elevated	–	
Nandanam	நந்தனம்	Blue Line	25 May 2018	Underground	–	
Nanganallur Road	நங்கநல்லூர் சாலை	Blue Line	21 September 2016	Elevated	–	
Nehru Park	நேரு பூங்கா	Green Line	14 May 2017	Underground	–	
New Washermanpet	புது வண்ணரப்பேட்டை	Blue Line	14 February 2021	Elevated	–	
Pachaiyappa's College	பச்சையப்பன் கல்லூரி	Green Line	14 May 2017	Underground	–	
Poonamallee Bypass	பூவிருந்தவல்லி புறவழிச்சாலை	Yellow Line	11 October 2026	Elevated		
Poonamallee Bus Stand	பூவிருந்தவல்லி பேருந்து நிலையம்	Yellow Line	11 October 2026	Elevated		
Poonamallee Government Hospital	பூவிருந்தவல்லி அரசு மருத்துவமனை	Yellow Line	11 October 2026	Elevated		
Porur Bypass	போரூர் புறவழிச்சாலை	Yellow Line	11 October 2026	Elevated		
Porur Junction	போரூர் சந்திப்பு	Yellow Line	11 October 2026	Elevated		
Puratchi Thalaivar Dr. M.G. Ramachandran Central†¤	புரட்சித் தலைவர் டாக்டர். எம்.ஜி. இராமச்சந்திரன் சென்ட்ரல்	Blue Line; Green Line	10 February 2019; 25 May 2018	Underground	Transfer station for: Puratchi Thalaivar Dr. M.G. Ramachandran Central Railway Station, Moore Market Complex, Chennai Park and; Park Town railway stations	
Puratchi Thalaivi Dr. J. Jayalalithaa CMBT	புரட்சித் தலைவி டாக்டர். ஜெ. ஜெயலலிதா புறநகர் பேருந்து நிலையம்	Green Line	29 June 2015	Elevated	Transfer station for: Puratchi Thalaivar Dr. M.G.R. Bus Terminus	
Saidapet	சைதாப்பேட்டை	Blue Line	25 May 2018	Underground	–	
Shenoy Nagar	செனாய் நகர்	Green Line	14 May 2017	Underground	–	
Sir Theagaraya College	சர் தியாகரயா கல்லூரி	Blue Line	14 February 2021	Underground	–	
St. Thomas Mount††	பரங்கிமலை	Green Line	14 October 2016	Elevated	Transfer station for: St. Thomas Mount (Chennai Suburban and Chennai MRTS)	
Teynampet	தேனாம்பேட்டை	Blue Line	25 May 2018	Underground	–	
Thirumangalam	திருமங்கலம்	Green Line	14 May 2017	Underground	–	
Thelliyaragaram	தெள்ளியாரகரம்	Yellow Line	11 October 2026	Elevated		
Tiruvottriyur	திருவொற்றியூர்	Blue Line	14 February 2021	Elevated	–	
Tiruvottriyur Theradi	திருவொற்றியூர் தேரடி	Blue Line	13 March 2022	Elevated	–	
Thousand Lights	ஆயிரம் விளக்கு	Blue Line	10 February 2019	Underground	–	
Tollgate	சுங்கச்சாவடி	Blue Line	14 February 2021	Elevated	–	
Tondiarpet	தண்டையார்பேட்டை	Blue Line	14 February 2021	Underground	–	
Vadapalani*	வடபழனி	Green Line	29 June 2015	Elevated	Interchange stations connected by skywalk	
Vadapalani*	வடபழனி	Yellow Line	11 October 2026	Elevated	Interchange stations connected by skywalk	
Washermanpet†*	வண்ணாரப்பேட்டை	Blue Line	10 February 2019	Underground	Transfer station for: Washermanpet (Chennai Suburban)	
Wimco Nagar	விம்கோ நகர்	Blue Line	14 February 2021	Elevated	Transfer station for: Wimco Nagar (Chennai Suburban)	
Wimco Nagar Depot	விம்கோ நகர் பணிமனை	Blue Line	13 March 2022	Elevated	–	

=== Under-construction ===
Chennai Metro Phase 2 map (U/C)

Station name		Line	Opened	Layout	Notes	Ref.
English	Tamil	Line	Opened	Layout	Notes	Ref.
Adambakkam	ஆதம்பாக்கம்	Red Line	December 2026	Elevated	–	
Adyar Depot	அடையாறு பணிமனை	Purple Line	December 2027	Underground	–	
Adyar Junction	அடையாறு சந்திப்பு	Purple Line	December 2027	Underground	–	
Alapakkam Junction	ஆலப்பாக்கம் சந்திப்பு	Yellow Line; Red Line	December 2026	Elevated	–	
Alwarpet	ஆழ்வார்பேட்டை	Yellow Line	April 2027	Underground	–	
Alwarthirunagar	ஆழ்வார்திருநகர்	Yellow Line; Red Line	December 2026	Elevated	–	
Anna Flyover	அண்ணா மேம்பாலம்	Purple Line	December 2027	Underground	–	
Anna Nagar KV	அண்ணா நகர் கே.வி	Red Line	December 2026	Elevated	–	
Anna Nagar West	அண்ணா நகர் மேற்கு	Red Line	December 2026	Elevated	–	
Assisi Nagar	அசிசி நகர்	Red Line	December 2027	Elevated	–	
Ayanavaram	அயனாவரம்	Purple Line	December 2027	Underground	–	
Bharathidasan Road	பாரதிதாசன் சாலை	Yellow Line	April 2027	Underground	–	
Boat Club	படகு குழாம்	Yellow Line	April 2027	Underground	–	
Butt Road	பட் சாலை	Red Line	December 2026	Elevated	–	
Chennai Trade Centre	சென்னை வர்த்தக மையம்	Red Line	July 2026	Elevated	–	
Chetpet	சேத்துப்பட்டு	Purple Line	December 2027	Underground	–	
Classical Tamil Institute	செம்மொழித் தமிழாய்வு நிறுவனம்	Red Line	December 2026	Elevated	–	
Dr. Radhakrishnan Salai	டாக்டர் ராதாகிருஷ்ணன் சாலை	Purple Line	December 2027	Underground	–	
Echangadu	ஈச்சங்காடு	Red Line	December 2026	Elevated	–	
Elcot	எல்காட்	Red Line	December 2026	Elevated	–	
Gandhi Nagar	காந்தி நகர்	Purple Line	December 2026	Elevated	–	
Greenways Road	பசுமைவழிச் சாலை	Purple Line	December 2027	Underground	–	
Indira Nagar	இந்திரா நகர்	Purple Line	December 2027	Underground	–	
Karambakkam	காரம்பாக்கம்	Yellow Line; Red Line	December 2026	Elevated	–	
Karapakkam	காரப்பாக்கம்	Purple Line	December 2026	Elevated	–	
Kellys	கெல்லீஸ்	Purple Line	December 2027	Underground	–	
Kilkattalai	கீழ்க்கட்டளை	Red Line	December 2026	Elevated	–	
Kodambakkam	கோடம்பாக்கம்	Yellow Line	February 2027	Underground	–	
Kodambakkam Powerhouse	கோடம்பாக்கம் பவர்ஹவுஸ்	Yellow Line	July 2026	Elevated	–	
Kolathur Junction	கொளத்தூர் சந்திப்பு	Red Line	December 2028	Underground	–	
Kovilambakkam	கோவிலம்பாக்கம்	Red Line	December 2026	Elevated	–	
Koyambedu Market	கோயம்பேடு அங்காடி	Red Line	December 2026	Elevated	–	
Kutchery Road	கச்சேரி சாலை	Yellow Line	April 2027	Underground	–	
Lighthouse	கலங்கரை விளக்கம்	Yellow Line	April 2027	Underground	–	
Madhavaram Bus Terminus	மாதவரம் பேருந்து நிலையம்	Red Line	December 2027	Elevated	–	
Madhavaram Depot	மாதவரம் பணிமனை	Red Line	December 2027	At-grade	–	
Madhavaram High Road	மாதவரம் நெடுஞ்சாலை	Purple Line	December 2027	Underground	–	
Madhavaram Milk Colony	மாதவரம் பால் பண்ணை	Purple Line; Red Line	December 2027	Underground	–	
Madipakkam	மடிப்பாக்கம்	Red Line	December 2026	Elevated	–	
Manapakkam	மணப்பாக்கம்	Red Line	July 2026	Elevated	–	
Mandaveli	மந்தைவெளி	Purple Line	December 2027	Underground	–	
Manjambakkam	மஞ்சம்பாக்கம்	Red Line	December 2027	Elevated	–	
Medavakkam I	மேடவாக்கம் I	Red Line	December 2026	Elevated	–	
Medavakkam II	மேடவாக்கம் II	Red Line	December 2026	Elevated	–	
Mettukuppam	மேட்டுக்குப்பம்	Purple Line	December 2026	Elevated	–	
Moolakadai	மூலக்கடை	Purple Line	December 2027	Underground	–	
Mugalivakkam	முகலிவாக்கம்	Red Line	July 2026	Elevated	–	
Natesan Nagar	நடேசன் நகர்	Red Line	December 2026	Elevated	–	
Navallur	நாவலூர்	Purple Line	December 2026	Elevated	–	
Nehru Nagar	நேரு நகர்	Purple Line	December 2026	Elevated	–	
Nookampalayam Depot	நூகம்பாளையம் பணிமனை	Purple Line	December 2026	Elevated	–	
Nungambakkam	நுங்கம்பாக்கம்	Purple Line	December 2027	Underground	–	
Okkiyam Thoraipakkam	ஒக்கியம் துரைப்பாக்கம்	Purple Line	December 2026	Elevated	–	
Okkiyampet	ஒக்கியம்பேட்டை	Purple Line	December 2026	Elevated	–	
Otteri	ஓட்டேரி	Purple Line	December 2027	Underground	–	
Panagal Park	பனகல் பூங்கா	Yellow Line	February 2027	Underground	–	
Pattalam	பட்டாளம்	Purple Line	December 2027	Underground	–	
Perambur	பெரம்பூர்	Purple Line	December 2027	Underground	–	
Perambur Barracks Road	பெரம்பூர் பேரக்ஸ் சாலை	Purple Line	December 2028	Underground	–	
Perambur Market	பெரம்பூர் அங்காடி	Purple Line	December 2027	Underground	–	
Perumbakkam	பெரும்பாக்கம்	Red Line	December 2026	Elevated	–	
Perungudi	பெருங்குடி	Purple Line	December 2026	Elevated	–	
PTC Colony	பி.டி.சி. காலனி	Purple Line	December 2026	Elevated	–	
Purasaiwakkam	புரசைவாக்கம்	Purple Line	December 2027	Underground	–	
Ramapuram	ராமாபுரம்	Red Line	July 2026	Elevated	–	
Retteri Junction	ரெட்டேரி சந்திப்பு	Red Line	December 2027	Elevated	–	
Royapettah	ராயப்பேட்டை	Purple Line	December 2027	Underground	–	
Saligramam	சாலிகிராமம்	Yellow Line	July 2026	Elevated	–	
Saligramam Warehouse	சாலிகிராமம் கிடங்கு	Yellow Line	July 2026	Elevated	–	
Sembiyum	செம்பியம்	Purple Line	December 2027	Underground	–	
Semmancheri I	செம்மஞ்சேரி I	Purple Line	December 2026	Elevated	–	
Semmancheri II	செம்மஞ்சேரி II	Purple Line	December 2026	Elevated	–	
Shastri Nagar Chennai	சாஸ்திரி நகர்	Red Line	December 2027	Elevated	–	
Sholinganallur	சோழிங்கநல்லூர்	Red LinePurple Line	December 2026	Elevated	–	
Sholinganallur Lake I	சோழிங்கநல்லூர் ஏரி I	Purple Line	December 2026	Elevated	–	
Sholinganallur Lake II	சோழிங்கநல்லூர் ஏரி II	Purple Line	December 2026	Elevated	–	
SIPCOT I	சிப்காட் 1	Purple Line	December 2026	Elevated	–	
SIPCOT II	சிப்காட் 2	Purple Line	December 2026	Elevated	–	
Siruseri	சிறுசேரி	Purple Line	December 2026	Elevated	–	
Srinivasa Nagar	சீனிவாச நகர்	Red Line	December 2028	Underground	–	
Sterling Road	ஸ்டெர்லிங் சாலை	Purple Line	December 2028	Underground	–	
Taramani	தரமணி	Purple Line	December 2027	Underground	–	
Thirumayilai	திருமயிலை	Yellow Line; Purple Line	April 2027	Underground	–	
Thiruvanmiyur	திருவான்மியூர்	Purple Line	December 2027	Underground	–	
Thoraipakkam	துரைப்பாக்கம்	Purple Line	December 2026	Elevated	–	
Ullagaram	உள்ளகரம்	Red Line	December 2026	Elevated	–	
Valasaravakkam	வளசரவாக்கம்	Yellow Line; Red Line	December 2026	Elevated	–	
Vanuvampet	வானுவம்பேட்டை	Red Line	December 2026	Elevated	–	
Vellakkal	வெள்ளக்கல்	Red Line	December 2026	Elevated	–	
Velmurugan Nagar	வேல்முருகன் நகர்	Red Line	December 2027	Elevated	–	
Villivakkam	வில்லிவாக்கம்	Red Line	December 2028	Underground	–	
Villivakkam Bus Terminus	வில்லிவாக்கம் பேருந்து நிலையம்	Red Line	December 2028	Underground	–	
Villivakkam CTH Road	வில்லிவாக்கம் சி.டி.எச் சாலை	Red Line	December 2028	Underground	–	
Virugambakkam	விருகம்பாக்கம்	Red Line	December 2026	Elevated	–	

== Depots ==
Sr no.	Station name		Line	Opened	Layout	Notes	Refs
Sr no.	English	Tamil	Line	Opened	Layout	Notes	Refs
1	Koyambedu Depot	கோயம்பேடு பணிமனை	Green Line	29 June 2015	At-grade	–	–
2	Wimco Nagar Depot	விம்கோ நகர் பணிமனை	Blue Line	14 March 2022	Elevated	–	–
3	Poonamallee Depot	பூவிருந்தவல்லி பணிமனை	Yellow Line	11 October 2026	At-grade	–	–
4	Madhavaram Depot	மாதவரம் பணிமனை	Red Line	TBD	At-grade	–	–
5	Semmancheri Depot	செம்மஞ்சேரி பணிமனை	Purple Line	TBD	Elevated	–	–
6	Pattabiram Depot	பட்டிபிராம் பணிமனை	Red Line	TBD	TBD	–	–

== Interchange stations ==
Sr no.	Station name		Line	Layout	Notes	Refs
Sr no.	English	Tamil	Line	Layout	Notes	Refs
1	Puratchi Thalaivar Dr. M.G. Ramachandran Central	புரட்சித் தலைவர் டாக்டர். எம்.ஜி. இராமச்சந்திரன் சென்ட்ரல்	Green Line Blue Line	Underground		
2	Arignar Anna Alandur	அறிஞர் அண்ணா ஆலந்தூர்	Green Line Blue LineRed Line	Elevated		
3	Vadapalani	வடபழனி	Green Line Yellow Line	Elevated		
4	Kilpauk	கீழ்ப்பாக்கம்	Green Line Purple Line	Underground		
5	Nandanam	நந்தனம்	Blue Line Yellow Line	Underground		
6	Koyambedu	கோயம்பேடு	Green Line Red Line	Elevated		
7	St. Thomas Mount	பரங்கிமலை	Green Line Red Line	Elevated		
8	Thirumangalam	திருமங்கலம்	Green Line Red Line	Elevated		
9	Thousand Lights	ஆயிரம் விளக்கு	Blue Line Purple Line	Underground		
10	Thirumayilai	திருமயிலை	Yellow Line Purple Line	Underground		
11	Madhavaram Milk Colony	மாதவரம் பால் பண்ணை	Red Line Purple Line	Underground		
12	Valasaravakkam	வளசரவாக்கம்	Yellow Line Red Line	Elevated		
13	Karambakkam	காரம்பாக்கம்	Yellow Line Red Line	Elevated		
14	Alwarthiru Nagar	ஆழ்வார்திருநகர்	Yellow Line Red Line	Elevated		
15	Alapakkam Junction	ஆலப்பாக்கம் சந்திப்பு	Yellow Line Red Line	Elevated		
16	Sholinganallur	சோழிங்கநல்லூர்	Red Line Purple Line	Elevated		

== Statistics ==
Category	Total : -
Total number of metro stations	146
Total number of metro stations operational	52
Total number of metro stations under construction	94
Number of interchange stations	3 (14 in Future) Total -16
Number of elevated stations	80 [Phase I and II (U/C)]
Number of underground stations	64 [Phase I and II (U/C)]
Number of at-grade stations	1 [Phase I and II (U/C)]

== See also ==
- List of Ahmedabad Metro stations
- List of Coimbatore Metro stations
- List of Delhi Metro stations
- List of Hyderabad Metro stations
- List of Jaipur Metro stations
- List of Kochi Metro stations
- List of Kolkata Metro stations
- List of Lucknow Metro stations
- List of Madurai Metro stations
- List of Mumbai Metro stations
- List of Nagpur Metro stations
- List of Namma Metro stations
- List of Navi Mumbai Metro Stations
- List of Noida Metro stations
- List of Pune Metro stations
- List of Surat Metro stations
