= Tiruvottriyur metro station =

Chennai Metro's Blue Line metro station

Thiruvottriyur

General information
- Location: Rettai Malai Srinivasan Nagar, Manickam Nagar, Tiruvottiyur, Chennai, Tamil Nadu 600019
- Coordinates: 13°10′18″N 80°18′19″E
- System: Chennai Metro station
- Owner: Chennai Metro
- Operator: Chennai Metro Rail Limited (CMRL)
- Line: Blue Line
- Platforms: Side platform Platform-1 → Chennai International Airport (to be extended to Kilambakkam in the future); Platform-2 → Wimco Nagar Depot
- Tracks: 2

Construction
- Structure type: Elevated, Double track
- Accessible: Yes

Other information
- Station code: STV

History
- Opened: 14 February 2021; 5 years ago
- Electrified: Single-phase 25 kV, 50 Hz AC through overhead catenary

Services
Preceding station	Chennai Metro	Following station
Wimco Nagar towards Wimco Nagar Depot	Blue Line	Thiruvottriyur Theradi towards Chennai International Airport
Wimco Nagar towards Wimco Nagar Depot	Blue Line (Future Service)	Thiruvottriyur Theradi towards Kilambakkam
Route map
Location

Thiruvottriyur is an elevated metro station on the North-South Corridor of the Line 1 Extension of the Blue Line of Chennai Metro in Chennai, India. This station will serve the neighbourhoods of Thiruvottriyur and other northern suburbs of Chennai.

== History ==
The station was inaugurated on 14 February 2021, with the inauguration of the northern extension of Blue line of Phase I.

== Station layout ==
G	Street level	Exit/Entrance
L1	Mezzanine	Fare control, station agent, Metro Card vending machines, crossover
L2	Side platform | Doors will open on the left
L2	Platform 1 Southbound	Towards → Chennai International Airport; Next Station: Tiruvottriyur Theradi (to be further extended to Kilambakkam in the future)
L2	Platform 2 Northbound	Towards ← Wimco Nagar Depot; Next Station: Wimco Nagar
L2	Side platform | Doors will open on the left
L2

== See also ==
- Chennai
- List of Chennai metro stations
- Railway stations in Chennai
