= Meenambakkam metro station =

Chennai Metro's Blue Line metro station

Meenambakkam

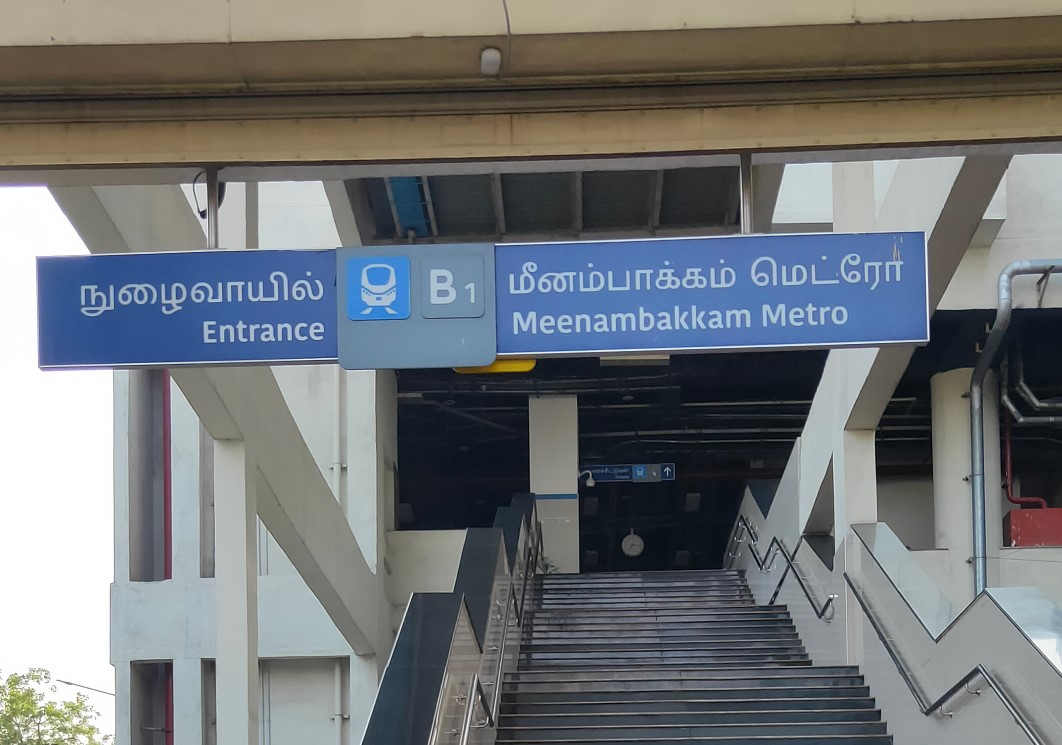
- Meenambakkam metro station (Entrance B1)

General information
- Location: Meenambakkam, Chennai, Tamil Nadu 600016; India
- Coordinates: 12.987664°N 80.176459°E
- System: Chennai Metro station
- Owner: Chennai Metro
- Operator: Chennai Metro Rail Limited (CMRL)
- Line: Blue Line Inter Corridor Line
- Platforms: Side platform Platform-1 → Chennai International Airport (to be extended to Kilambakkam in the future); Platform-2 → Wimco Nagar Depot
- Tracks: 2
- Connections: Meenambakkam

Construction
- Structure type: Elevated, Double track
- Accessible: Yes

Other information
- Station code: SME

History
- Opened: 21 September 2016; 9 years ago
- Electrified: Single-phase 25 kV, 50 Hz AC through overhead catenary

Services
Preceding station	Chennai Metro	Following station
Nanganallur Road towards Wimco Nagar Depot	Blue Line	Chennai International Airport Terminus
Nanganallur Road towards Wimco Nagar Depot	Blue Line (Future Service)	Chennai International Airport towards Kilambakkam
Route map
Location

Meenambakkam is an elevated metro station on the North-South Corridor of the Blue Line of Chennai Metro in Chennai, India. This station serves the neighbourhoods of Meenambakkam and Tirusulam.

== Construction ==
The construction work of the station was awarded to URC Construction Company Private Limited, Erode.

== Station ==
The station is an elevated one although the stretch after the station dips below the ground for a brief distance to negotiate the air funnel area of the second runway of the airport.

=== Traffic ===
As of 2019, Meenambakkam Metro had a footfall of nearly 2,500 a day.

=== Parking ===
The station has a parking lot with a capacity of 200 to 250 vehicles. In December 2019, the CMRL introduced multi-level two-wheeler parking at the station.

== Station layout ==
G	Street level	Exit/Entrance
L1	Mezzanine	Fare control, station agent, Metro Card vending machines, crossover
L2	Side platform | Doors will open on the left
L2	Platform 1 Southbound	Towards → Chennai International Airport (to be further extended to Kilambakkam in the future)
L2	Platform 2 Northbound	Towards ← Wimco Nagar Depot; Next Station: Nanganallur Road
L2	Side platform | Doors will open on the left
L2

== See also ==
- List of Chennai metro stations
- Chennai Metro
- Chennai International Airport
- Meenambakkam
