= Tiruvottriyur Theradi metro station =

Chennai Metro's Blue Line metro station

Thiruvottriyur Theradi

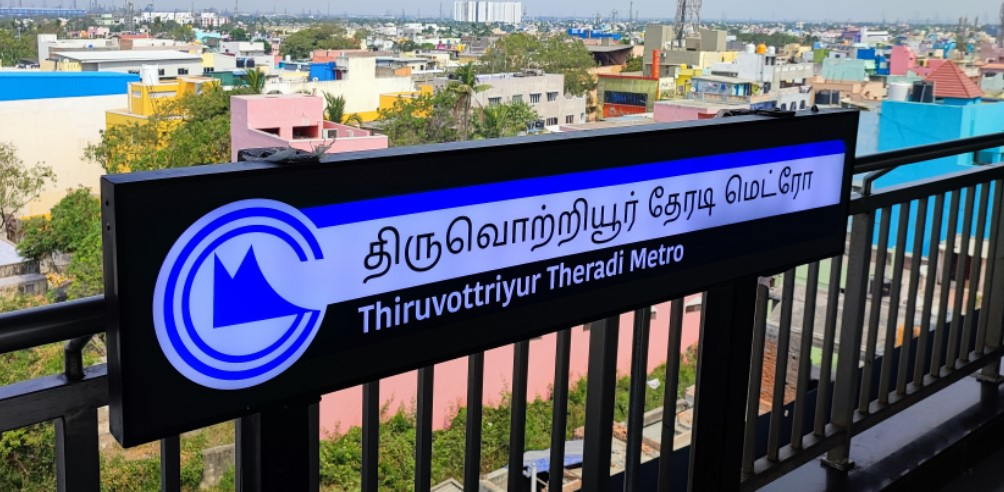

General information
- Location: Thiruvottriyur, Chennai, Tamil Nadu
- Coordinates: 13°09′36″N 80°17′59″E
- System: Chennai Metro station
- Owner: Chennai Metro
- Operator: Chennai Metro Rail Limited (CMRL)
- Line: Blue Line
- Platforms: Side platform Platform-1 → Chennai International Airport (to be extended to Kilambakkam in the future); Platform-2 → Wimco Nagar Depot
- Tracks: 2

Construction
- Structure type: Elevated, Double track
- Accessible: Yes

Other information
- Status: Operational
- Station code: STT

History
- Opened: 14 March 2022; 4 years ago
- Electrified: Single-phase 25 kV, 50 Hz AC through overhead catenary

Services
Preceding station	Chennai Metro	Following station
Tiruvottriyur towards Wimco Nagar Depot	Blue Line	Kaladipet towards Chennai International Airport
Tiruvottriyur towards Wimco Nagar Depot	Blue Line (Future Service)	Kaladipet towards Kilambakkam
Route map
Location

Thiruvottriyur Theradi (formerly known as Gowri Ashram Metro Station) is an elevated metro station on the North-South Corridor of the Line 1 Extension of the Blue Line of Chennai Metro in Chennai, India. This station will serve the neighbourhoods of Thiruvottriyur and other northern suburbs of Chennai. This station was inaugurated along with Wimco Nagar Depot Metro Station on March 14, 2022.

== History ==
The station was still under construction during the inaugurated of the northern extension of Blue line of Phase I on 14 February 2021, so the stretch opened with other stations. The station is expected to be completed by January 2022. During the Construction of this station metro trains skips this station. This station was inaugurated along with wimco nagar depot metro station on March 14, 2022

== Station layout ==
G	Street level	Exit/Entrance
L1	Mezzanine	Fare control, station agent, Metro Card vending machines, crossover
L2	Side platform | Doors will open on the left
L2	Platform 1 Southbound	Towards → Chennai International Airport; Next Station: Kaladipet (to be further extended to Kilambakkam in the future)
L2	Platform 2 Northbound	Towards ← Wimco Nagar Depot; Next Station: Tiruvottriyur
L2	Side platform | Doors will open on the left
L2

== See also ==
- Chennai
- List of Chennai metro stations
- Railway stations in Chennai
