= Wimco Nagar metro station =

Chennai Metro's Blue Line terminal metro station

Wimco Nagar

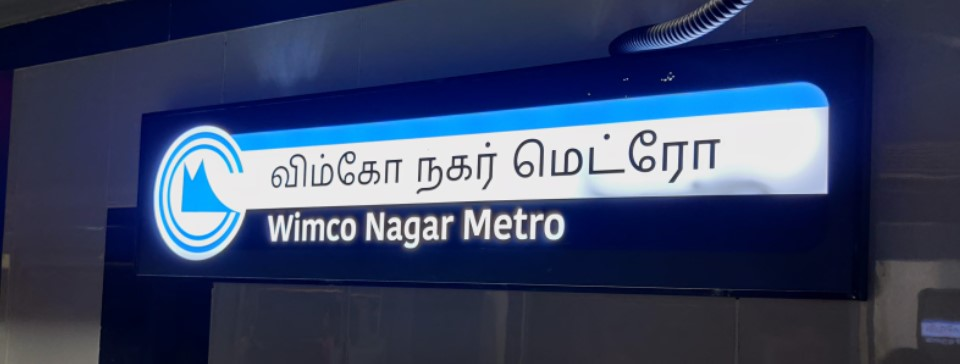

General information
- Location: Wimco Nagar, Tiruvottiyur, Chennai, Tamil Nadu 600019
- Coordinates: 13°10′45″N 80°18′26″E
- System: Chennai Metro station
- Owner: Chennai Metro
- Operator: Chennai Metro Rail Limited (CMRL)
- Line: Blue Line
- Platforms: Side platform Platform-1 → Chennai International Airport (to be extended to Kilambakkam in the future); Platform-2 → Wimco Nagar Depot
- Tracks: 2
- Connections: Wimco Nagar

Construction
- Structure type: Elevated, Double track
- Platform levels: 2
- Accessible: Yes

Other information
- Station code: SWN

History
- Opened: 14 February 2021; 5 years ago
- Electrified: Single-phase 25 kV, 50 Hz AC through overhead catenary

Services
Preceding station	Chennai Metro	Following station
Wimco Nagar Depot Terminus	Blue Line	Tiruvottriyur towards Chennai International Airport
Wimco Nagar Depot Terminus	Blue Line (Future Service)	Tiruvottriyur towards Kilambakkam
Route map
Location

Wimco Nagar is an elevated metro station on the North-South Corridor of the Line 1 Extension of the Blue Line of Chennai Metro in Chennai, India. This station will serve the neighbourhoods of Wimco Nagar and other northern suburbs of Chennai. It is located in the neighbourhood of Tiruvottiyur, about 600 meters off the coast.

== History ==
The station was inaugurated on 14 February 2021, with the inauguration of the northern extension of Blue line of Phase I.

== Station layout ==
G	Street level	Exit/Entrance
L1	Mezzanine	Fare control, station agent, Metro Card vending machines, crossover
L2	Side platform | Doors will open on the left
L2	Platform 1 Southbound	Towards → Chennai International Airport; Next Station: Tiruvottriyur (to be further extended to Kilambakkam in the future)
L2	Platform 2 Northbound	Towards ← Wimco Nagar Depot
L2	Side platform | Doors will open on the left
L2

== Depot ==
With the inauguration of the northern extension of Blue line of Phase I, a depot was planned for the Wimco Nagar metro station. In January 2022, the Chennai Metro Rail Corporation decided to build a new station named "Wimco Nagar Depot" at this depot, located about 500 meters from the station.

== Connectivity ==
=== Rail ===
- Wimco Nagar railway station

== See also ==
- Wimco Nagar railway station
- List of Chennai metro stations
- Railway stations in Chennai
- Chennai Mass Rapid Transit System
- Chennai Monorail
- Chennai Suburban Railway
- Transport in Chennai
