= Blue Line (Chennai Metro) =

Transit line in Chennai, India

Blue Line (Line 1)
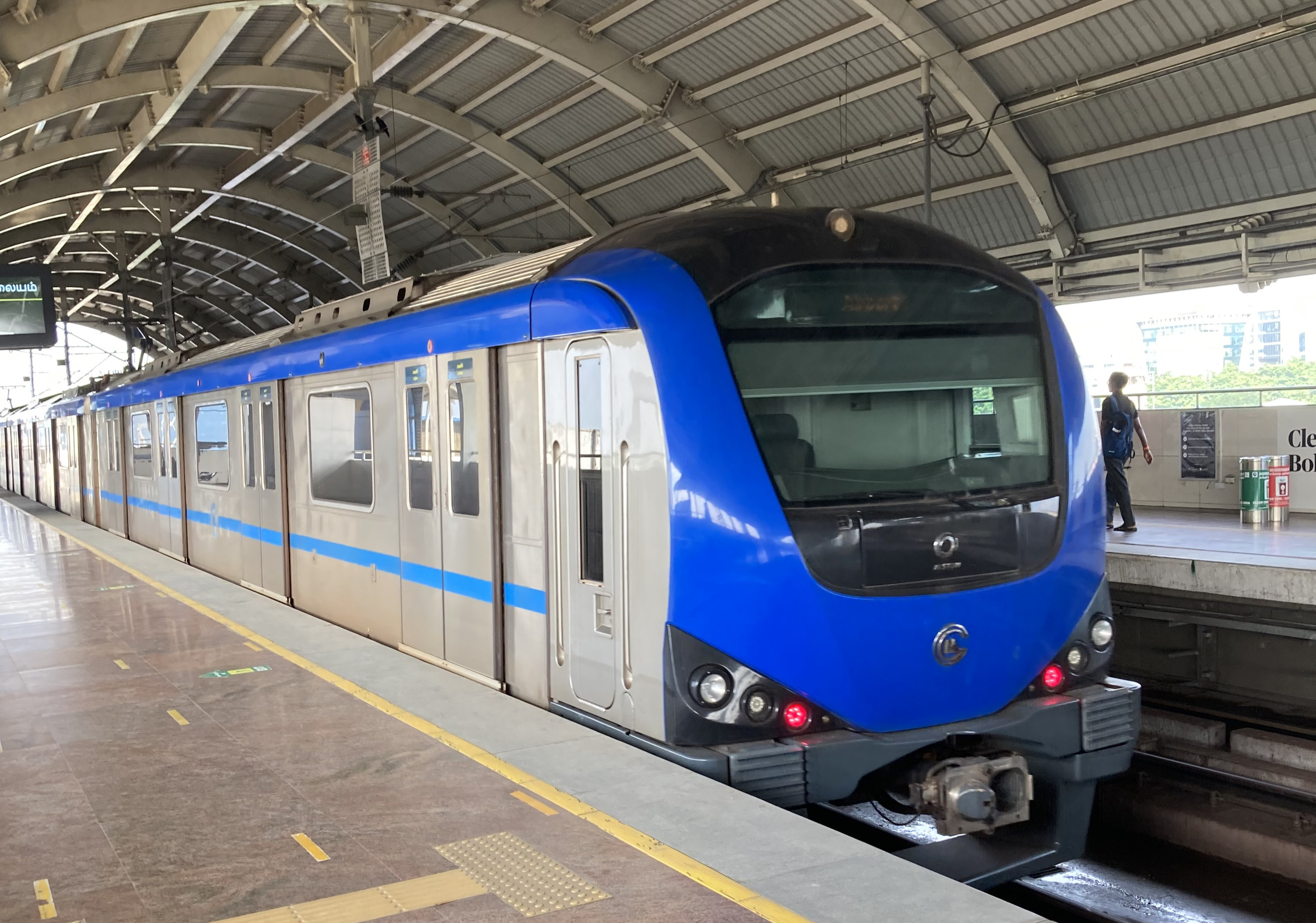
- A train on the Blue Line

Overview
- Other name: Wimco Nagar - Airport line
- Native name: நீல வழித்தடம்
- Status: Operational
- Termini: Chennai Airport; Wimco Nagar Depot
- Connecting lines: Operational (8): Green Line Yellow Line, Chennai MRTS , Chennai Suburban North Line , Chennai Suburban West Line , Chennai Suburban West North Line, Chennai Suburban South Line , Chennai Suburban South West Line; Upcoming (2): Purple Line Red Line
- Stations: 26 (Operational) + 11 (Planned) Total = 37

Service
- Type: Rapid transit
- System: Chennai Metro
- Operator: Chennai Metro Rail Limited
- Depot: Wimco Nagar
- Rolling stock: Alstom

History
- Opened: 21 September 2016; 10 years ago
- Last extension: 2019

Technical
- Line length: 32.65 km (20.29 mi)
- Num of tracks: 2
- Character: 17 km (11 mi) Underground; 15.65 km (9.72 mi) Elevated
- Track gauge: 1,435 mm (4 ft 8 1/2 in) standard gauge
- Electrification: 25 kV 50 Hz AC overhead catenary
- Operating speed: 80 km/h (50 mph)

The Blue Line or Line 1 is one of the three operational lines of Chennai Metro, apart from the Green Line and the Yellow Line, in Chennai, India. The line stretches from Chennai Airport to Wimco Nagar Depot, covering a distance of 32.65 km (20.29 mi). The line consists of 26 stations, out of which 13 stations are underground and the rest are elevated or on ground level. In May 2018, operations on the blue line commenced between Saidapet and AG-DMS with the extended underground stretch from AG-DMS to Washermanpet of the Blue Line commencing operations on 10 February 2019, completing Phase 1 of the metro.

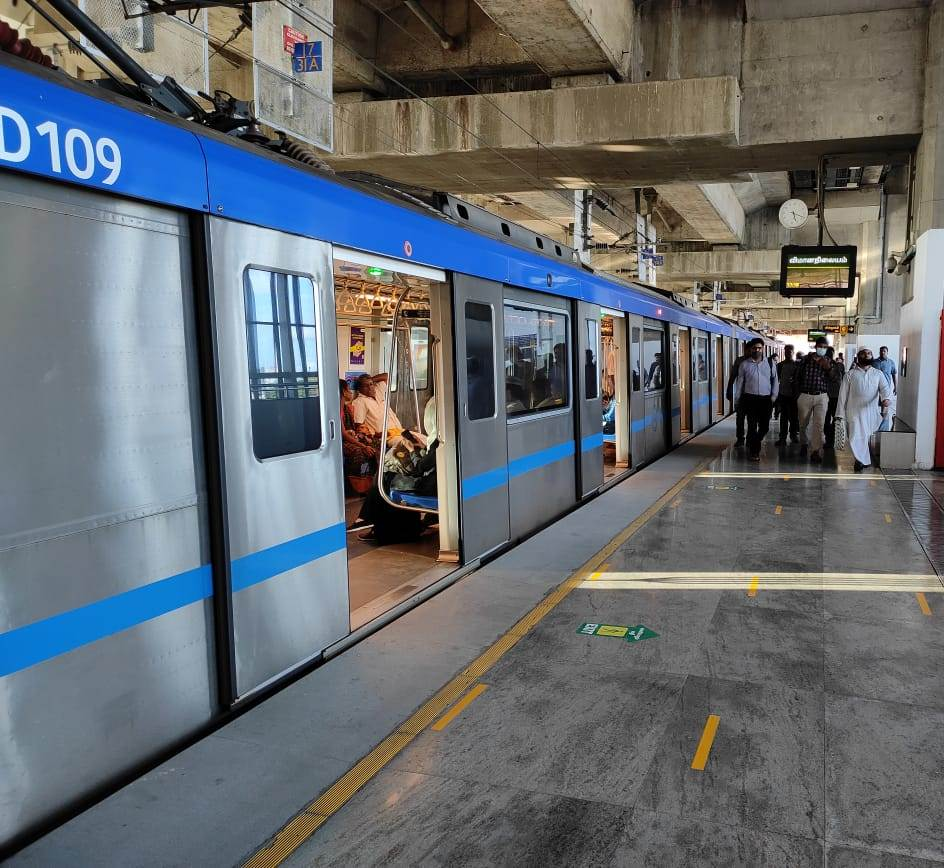
An airport-bound metro at Alandur station

== Planning and construction ==
=== Phase I ===
In 2006, a modern metro rail system was planned for Chennai modeled after the Delhi Metro. Delhi Metro Rail Corporation (DMRC) was tasked with preparing a detailed project report on the implementation of metro system in Chennai. Based on the report, the Government of Tamil Nadu approved the first phase of the project in November 2007. The first phase was planned with two lines covering 45.1 km (28.0 mi) with 25 km (15.5 mi) being underground. The first corridor would connect Washermanpet with Chennai International Airport extending for 23.1 km (14.4 mi) with 14.3 km (8.9 mi) being underground. In December 2007, Chennai Metro Rail Limited (CMRL) was incorporated and the Government of India gave approval for the project in January 2009.

The construction started in June 2009. In August 2010, the contract for supplying rolling stock was awarded to Alstom. Test and trial runs happened on the Green line in 2013 and early 2014. After approvals from RDSO and the Commissioner of Metro Rail Safety, commercial operations started between Alandur and Koyambedu stations on the green line in June 2015. On 21 September 2016, commercial operations commenced between Airport and Little Mount on the blue line. In May 2018, the blue line was extended between Saidapet and AG-DMS. On 10 February 2019, the underground stretch from AG-DMS to Washermanpet of blue line was opened, completing the first phase of the metro.

=== Phase 1 Extension ===
A 9 kilometres (5.59 mi) northern extension of the blue line running from Washermanpet to Wimco Nagar consisting of nine stations. Construction started in July 2016 with trial runs in December 2020. The line opened for passenger traffic on 14 February 2021, increasing the length of the operational metro system to 54.1 km (33.62 mi).

Phase I
Line Name	Terminals		Stations	Opened	Map
Blue Line	Chennai Airport	Little Mount	6	21 September 2016	
Blue Line	Little Mount	AG–DMS	4	25 May 2018	
Blue Line	AG–DMS	Washermanpet	7	10 February 2019	
Blue Line	Phase I extension				
Blue Line	Washermanpet	Wimco Nagar	8	14 February 2021	
Blue Line	Wimco Nagar	Wimco Nagar Depot	1	13 March 2022	

=== Future plans ===
In 2021, CMRL proposed an extension to the first phase to connect the Airport with Kilambakkam. A detailed project report for the project was submitted by CMRL in 2022. The As of October 2023, the project is awaiting funds.

Line	Terminals		Length	Stations	Status
Blue Line	Chennai Airport	Kilambakkam	15.46 km (9.61 mi)	13	DPR approved

== Infrastructure ==
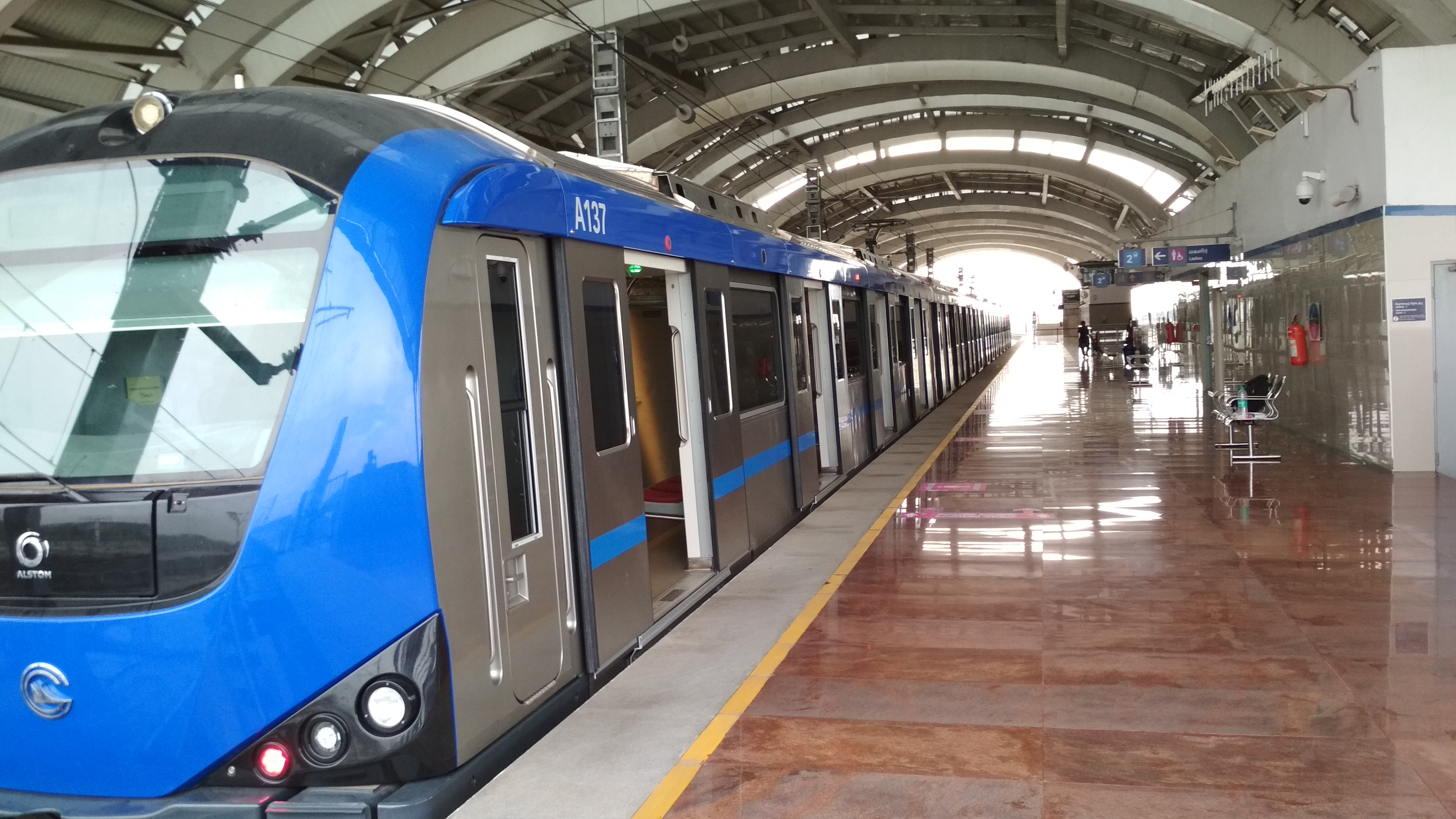
Chennai metro coaches are manufactured by Alstom

The trains are operated on 1,435 mm (4 ft 8 1/2 in) standard gauge double-tracked lines. The average speed of operation is 85 kilometres per hour (53 mph) and maximum speed is 120 kilometres per hour (75 mph). Alstom supplies the rolling stock for the trains operated on the line. The trains are air-conditioned with electrically operated automatic sliding doors and have a first-class compartment with a dedicated section reserved for women.

The trains operate on 25 kV AC traction catenary system. The trains are connected to the grid via overhead electric cables and are equipped with regenerative braking with a capacity to recover 30–35% of the energy during braking. The electricity is supplied by Tamil Nadu Electricity Board.

== Network ==
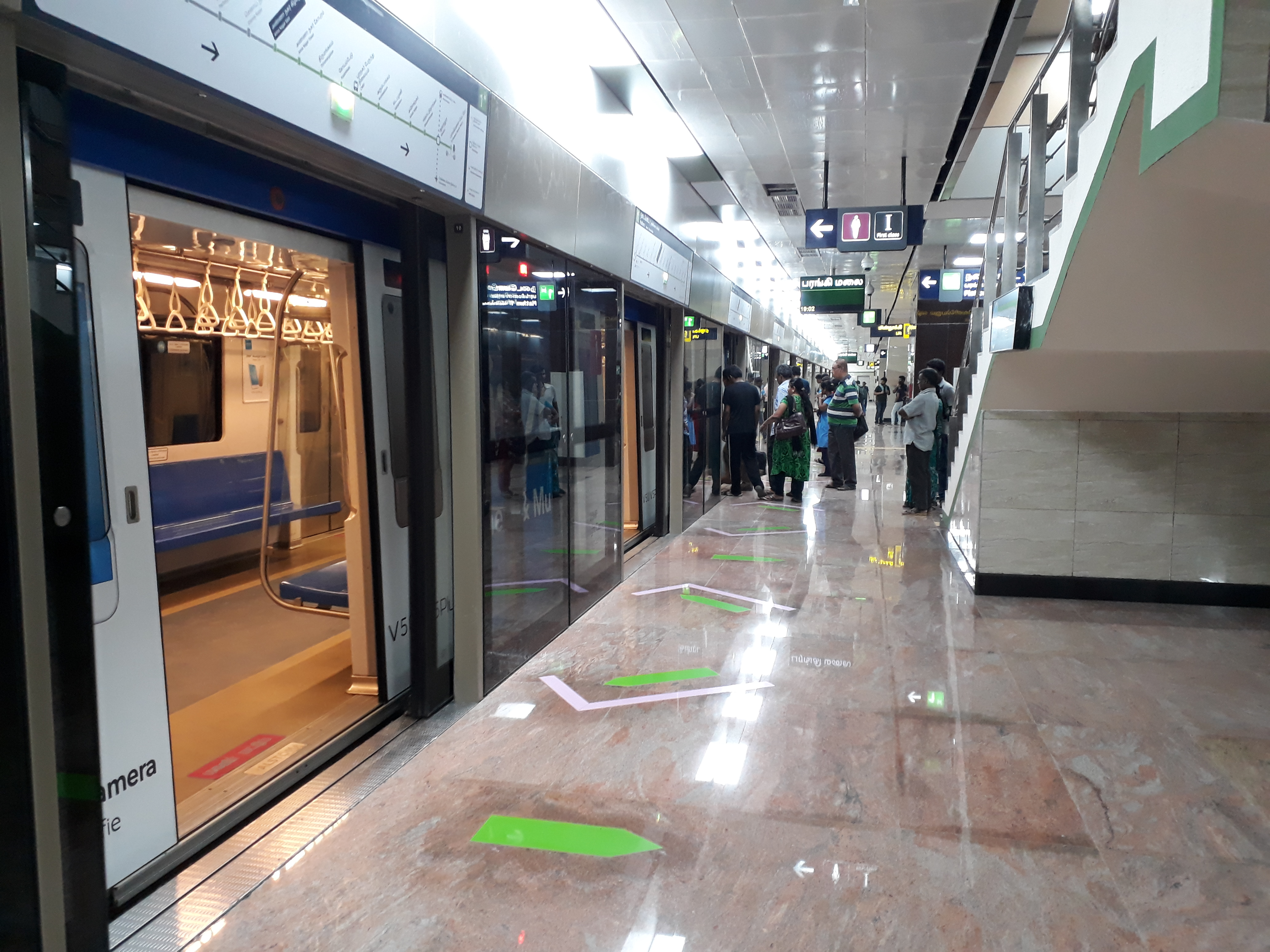
Platform screen doors installed in underground stations

A total of 26 stations are operational along the blue line with 13 underground stations. In the underground sections, a walkway runs along the length with cross passages every 250 metres (820 ft 3 in) for the maintenance and emergency evacuation. The underground stations have an average width of 200 metres (656 ft 2 in) and average depth of 20 feet (6.1 m) from the ground level. The length of the stations in Phase 1 extension is 180 metres (590 ft 7 in). The elevated stations have three levels with the concourse level at a minimum height of 5.5 metres (18 ft 1 in) above the ground level and platform level above the concourse while the underground stations have two levels with platform screen doors. The stations are air-conditioned and are equipped to be disabled and elderly friendly, with automatic fare collection system, announcement system, electronic display boards, escalators and lifts. Paid parking facilities are available for two wheelers in most stations and four wheelers in select stations.

The line connects the northeast and the southwest ends of the city. The stations include:

Blue Line
S.No	Station name		Opened	Connections	Station layout	Platform Level Type
S.No	English	Tamil	Opened	Connections	Station layout	Platform Level Type
1	Wimco Nagar Depot	விம்கோ நகர் பணிமனை	13 March 2022		Elevated	Side
2	Wimco Nagar	விம்கோ நகர்	14 February 2021	Wimco Nagar (North Line)	Elevated	Side
3	Tiruvottriyur	திருவொற்றியூர்	14 February 2021		Elevated	Side
4	Tiruvottriyur Theradi	திருவொற்றியூர் தேரடி	13 March 2022		Elevated	Side
5	Kaladipet	காலடிப்பேட்டை	14 February 2021		Elevated	Side
6	Tollgate	சுங்கச்சாவடி	14 February 2021		Elevated	Side
7	New Washermanpet	புது வண்ணாரப்பேட்டை	14 February 2021		Elevated	Side
8	Tondiarpet	தண்டையார்பேட்டை	14 February 2021		Underground	Island
9	Sir Theagaraya College	தியாகராயா கல்லூரி	14 February 2021		Underground	Island
10	Washermanpet	வண்ணாரப்பேட்டை	10 February 2019	Washermanpet (North Line)	Underground	Island
11	Mannadi	மண்ணடி	10 February 2019		Underground	Island
12	High Court	உயர் நீதிமன்றம்	10 February 2019	Broadway bus terminus	Underground	Island
13	Central	சென்ட்ரல்	10 February 2019	Green Line; Chennai Central; Chennai Park (South Line); Moore Market (West Line); Park Town (Chennai MRTS)	Underground	Island
14	Government Estate	அரசினர் தோட்டம்	10 February 2019	Chintadripet (Chennai MRTS)	Underground	Island
15	LIC	எல்.ஐ.சி	10 February 2019		Underground	Island
16	Thousand Lights	ஆயிரம் விளக்கு	10 February 2019	Purple Line (Under Construction)	Underground	Island
17	AG – DMS	ஏ.ஜி.–டி.எம்.எஸ்.	25 May 2018		Underground	Island
18	Teynampet	தேனாம்பேட்டை	25 May 2018		Underground	Island
19	Nandanam	நந்தனம்	25 May 2018	Yellow Line (Under Construction)	Underground	Island
20	Saidapet	சைதாப்பேட்டை	25 May 2018		Underground	Island
21	Little Mount	சின்னமலை	21 September 2016		Elevated	Side
22	Guindy	கிண்டி	21 September 2016	Guindy (South Line)	Elevated	Side
23	Alandur	ஆலந்தூர்	21 September 2016	Green Line; Red Line (Under Construction)	Elevated	Side
24	Nanganallur Road	நங்கநல்லூர் சாலை	21 September 2016		Elevated	Side
25	Meenambakkam	மீனம்பாக்கம்	21 September 2016	Meenambakkam (South Line)	Elevated	Side
26	Chennai Airport	சென்னை விமான நிலையம்	21 September 2016	Chennai International Airport; Tirusulam (South Line)	Elevated	Side
27	Pallavaram*	பல்லாவரம்	TBA	Pallavaram (South Line)	TBA	TBA
28	Kothandam Nagar*	கோதண்டம் நகர்	TBA		TBA	TBA
29	Chromepet*	குரோம்பேட்டை	TBA	Chromepet (South Line)	TBA	TBA
30	MEPZ*	மெட்ராஸ் எக்ஸ்போர்ட் பிராசஸிங் ஜோன்	TBA	Tambaram Sanatorium (South Line)	TBA	TBA
31	Tambaram*	தாம்பரம்	TBA	Tambaram (South Line)	TBA	TBA
32	Irumbuliyur*	இரும்புலியூர்	TBA		TBA	TBA
33	Peerkankaranai*	பீர்க்கன்கரனை	TBA		TBA	TBA
34	Perungalathur*	பெருங்களத்தூர்	TBA	Perungalathur (South Line)	TBA	TBA
35	Vandalur*	வண்டலூர்	TBA	Vandalur (South Line)	TBA	TBA
36	Arignar Anna Zoological Park *	அரிக்னார் அண்ணா உயிரியல் பூங்கா	TBA		TBA	TBA
37	Kilambakkam Bus Terminus *	கிளாம்பாக்கம் பேருந்து நிலையம்	TBA	Kilambakkam Bus Terminus	TBA	TBA

^{§} under construction

'''*''' - To Be Confirmed

== Operations ==
As of 2022, the metro operates trains from 5 AM to 11 PM with an average frequency of one train every 5 minutes in peak hours and every 8 minutes in lean hours in the Blue Line. The main operational control center (OCC) is located in Koyambedu where the movement of trains and real-time CCTV footage obtained is monitored. In 2022, an elevated depot at Wimco Nagar covering an area of 3.5 ha (8.6 acres) commenced operations with facilities for inspection, emergency repair and a washing plant. The minimum fare is ₹10 and the maximum fare is ₹50, and this has not changed since the commencement of metro operations, as of October 2026. A 20% discount on the fare is given for tickets booked digitally (for example, through WhatsApp or the CMRL app), with the aim of reducing long lines at ticket booking counters. There are six types of tickets issued by CMRL for travel in Chennai Metro.

== See also ==
- List of rapid transit systems in India
- List of metro systems
