= Royapettah metro station =

Metro station in Chennai, India

Royapettah

General information
- Location: Westcott Road, Royapettah, Chennai, Tamil Nadu 600014; India
- Coordinates: 13.0547°N 80.2642°E
- System: Chennai Metro station
- Owner: Chennai Metro
- Operator: Chennai Metro Rail Limited
- Tracks: 2

Construction
- Structure type: Underground, Double track
- Parking: No
- Accessible: Yes

History
- Opened: Under construction
- Electrified: Single phase 25 kV, 50 Hz AC through overhead catenary
Route map
Location

Royapettah metro station is a metro railway station on the Purple Line of the Chennai Metro. The station is among the underground stations along corridor III of the Chennai Metro, Madhavaram Milk Colony–Siruseri Sipcot 2 stretch. The station serves the neighbourhoods of Royapettah, Triplicane, and Gopalapuram.

== History ==
Construction of the station began in October 2021. The old YMCA building was demolished for the construction purpose, and the entrance and exit points of the station would be built on 239 square meters of land.

== See also ==
- List of Chennai metro stations
- Railway stations in Chennai
- Transport in Chennai
- Urban rail transit in India
- List of metro systems
