= Wimco Nagar Depot metro station =

Metro station in Chennai, India

Wimco Nagar Depot Metro

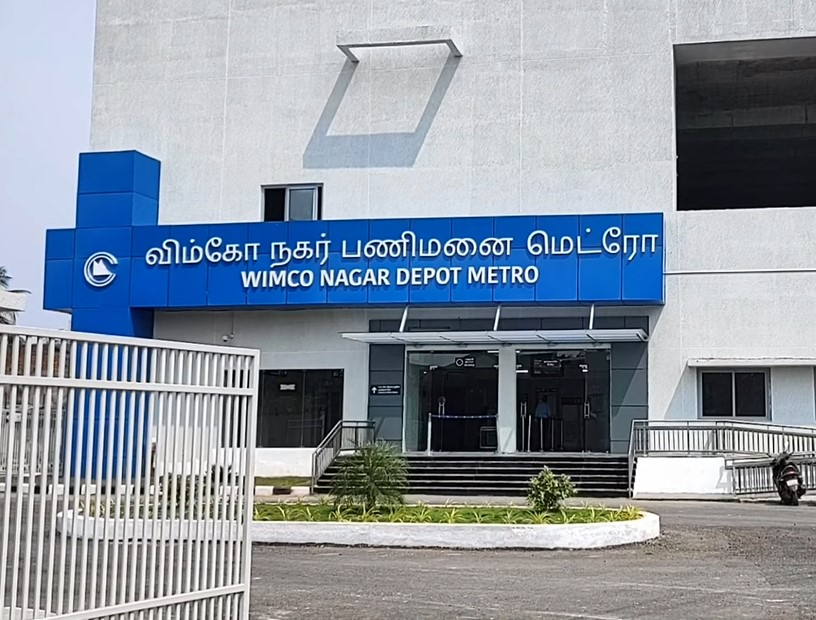

General information
- Location: Ernavur, Chennai, Tamil Nadu
- Coordinates: 13.18341°N 80.30854°E
- System: Chennai Metro station
- Owner: Chennai Metro
- Operator: Chennai Metro Rail Limited (CMRL)
- Line: Blue Line (Chennai Metro)
- Platforms: Island platforms Platform-1 → Chennai International Airport (to be extended to Kilambakkam in the future); Platform-2 → Train Terminates Here
- Tracks: 2

Construction
- Structure type: Elevated, Double track
- Platform levels: 2
- Accessible: Yes

Other information
- Station code: SWD

History
- Opened: 14 March 2022; 4 years ago
- Electrified: Single-phase 25 kV, 50 Hz AC through overhead catenary

Services
Preceding station	Chennai Metro	Following station
Terminus	Blue Line	Wimco Nagar towards Chennai International Airport
Terminus	Blue Line (Future Service)	Wimco Nagar towards Kilambakkam
Location

Wimco Nagar Depot Metro station is a Metro railway station on Line 1 Extension of the Chennai Metro. The station is one of the 10 stations in the Phase I northern extension and one of the 26 stations along the Blue Line (Chennai Metro) of the Chennai Metro. The station will serve the neighbourhoods of Ernavur and other northern suburbs of Chennai. This station was inaugurated along with Thiruvottriyur Theradi Metro Station on 14 March 2022.

== History ==
With the inauguration of the northern extension of Blue line of Phase I, a depot was planned for the Wimco Nagar metro station. In January 2022, the Chennai Metro Rail Corporation decided to build a new station at this depot, located about 500 meters from the station.

== The station ==
=== Structure ===
Wimco Nagar Depot is an elevated Metro station situated on the Blue Line (Chennai Metro). It is located in the neighbourhood of Ernavur, about 500 meters from the Wimco Nagar metro station.

=== Station layout ===
There will be two entrances for the Wimco Nagar Depot metro station.

G	Street level	Exit/Entrance
L1	Mezzanine	Fare control, station agent, Ticket/token, shops
L2	Side platform | Doors will open on the left
L2	Platform 1 Southbound	Towards → Chennai International Airport; Next Station: Wimco Nagar (to be further extended to Kilambakkam in the future)
L2	Platform 2 Northbound	Towards ← Train Terminates Here
L2	Side platform | Doors will open on the left
L2

== Depot ==
The elevated station will have a depot to maintain and park trains running between Washermanpet and Wimco Nagar. The depot will have 16 lines, including the one for the station. The depot will have a small station, a training facility, and other amenities for the depot staff and train operators. The depot station is separate from the Wimco Nagar elevated station and will be less than a kilometer away from the Wimco Nagar metro station. It will cover an area of 15,500 square meter and will be at a height of 12 meters. The depot will rest on 1,161 underground foundation pile columns. It is connected with a 1.8-meter-thick concrete raft on which 324 columns of varying thickness will be built. A four-level parking space will be built in these columns below the stabling lines. A 600-meter link corridor connects these lines with the mainline proceeding towards Wimco Nagar elevated station. Other features include a 7.5-meter-wide internal road around the depot, stormwater drains, and 600,000-liter (159,000 gallon) water tank. A 10,000-square-meter area near the depot will be earmarked for future parking spaces, besides a 1,055-square-meter auto coach washing plant with three levels for property development. Designed to handle all the 52 trains of the Metro, the depot is planned to be completed by December 2020.

The construction of the elevated depot began in 2018 at a cost of ₹ 2,300 million. The depot covers an area of 3.5 ha, with provision to station 12 trains. Other facilities in the depot include three inspections lines, one emergency repair line, and a small plant for washing trains. The Metro Rail is planning to build a 60-meter-tall, 20-storied building above the elevated depot station for residential or office space.

== Connectivity ==
=== Rail ===
- Wimco Nagar railway station

== See also ==
- Wimco Nagar railway station
- List of Chennai metro stations
- Railway stations in Chennai
- Chennai Mass Rapid Transit System
- Chennai Monorail
- Chennai Suburban Railway
- Transport in Chennai
