= Chennai International Airport metro station =

Chennai Metro's Blue Line terminal metro station

Airport Metro

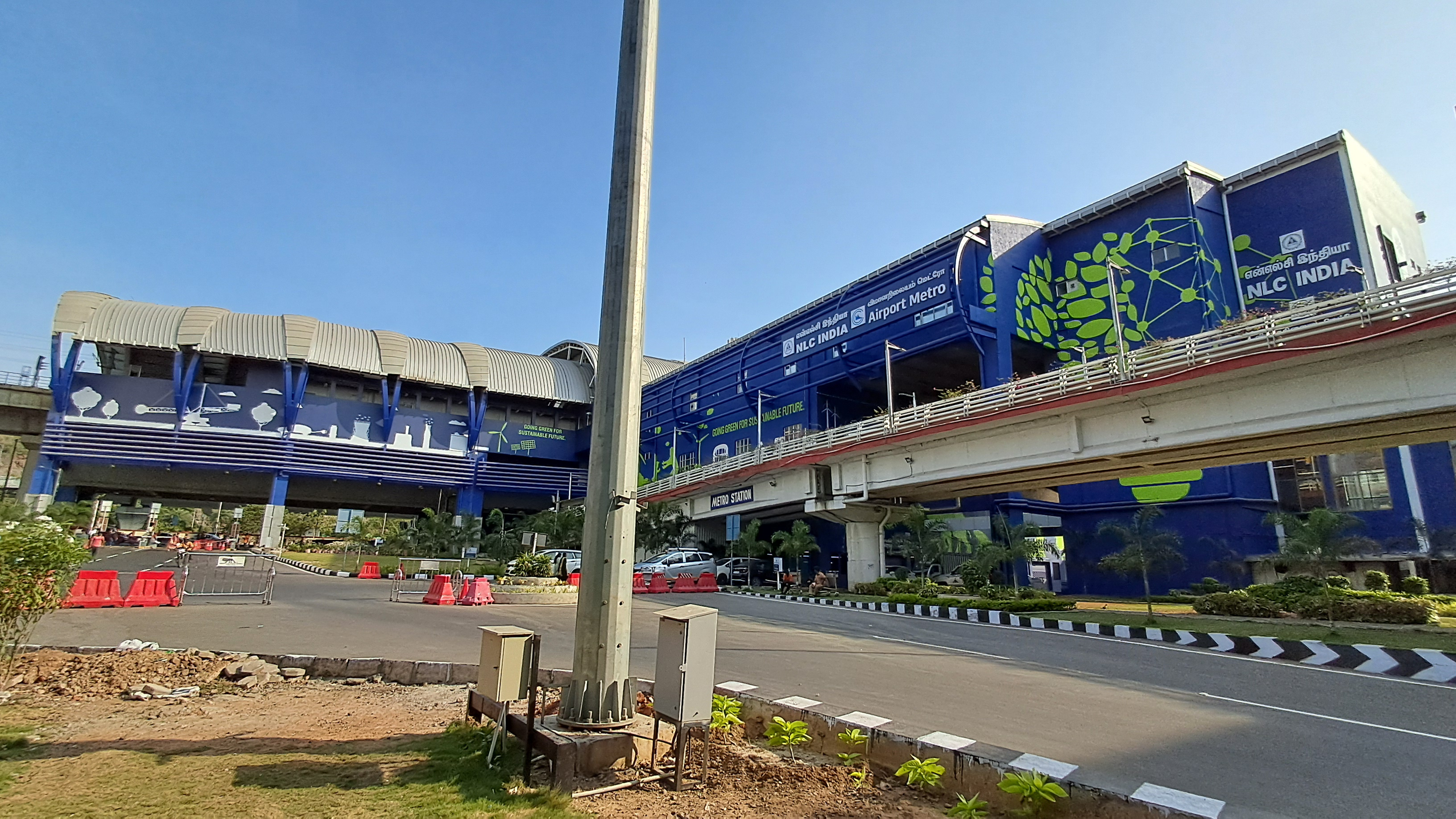
- Outside view of Airport metro station

General information
- Other names: Chennai International Airport
- Location: Meenambakkam, Chennai, Tamil Nadu 600016; India
- Coordinates: 12.980806°N 80.164197°E
- System: Chennai Metro station
- Owner: Chennai Metro
- Operator: Chennai Metro Rail Limited (CMRL)
- Line: Blue Line Inter Corridor Line
- Platforms: Side platform Platform-1 → Train Terminates Here (to be extended to Kilambakkam in the future); Platform-2 → Wimco Nagar Depot
- Tracks: 2
- Connections: Chennai International Airport; Tirusulam

Construction
- Structure type: Elevated, Double track
- Accessible: Yes

Other information
- Station code: SAP

History
- Opened: 21 September 2016; 10 years ago
- Electrified: Single-phase 25 kV, 50 Hz AC through overhead catenary

Passengers
- 2026: 20,000/day
- Rank: 3

Services
| Preceding station | Chennai Metro | Following station |
|---|---|---|
| Meenambakkam towards Wimco Nagar Depot | Blue Line | Terminus |
| Meenambakkam towards Wimco Nagar Depot | Blue Line (Future Service) | Pallavaram towards Kilambakkam |
| Preceding station | Chennai Suburban | Following station |
| Meenambakkam towards Chennai Beach | South Line transfer at Tirusulam | Pallavaram towards Tambaram, Chengalpattu Junction or Villupuram Junction |
Route map
Location

Airport Metro (formerly known as Chennai International Airport) is an elevated southern terminal metro station on the North-South Corridor of the Blue Line of Chennai Metro in Chennai, India. This station serves the Chennai International Airport and the neighbourhoods of Nanganallur, Meenambakkam, Tirusulam, Pallavaram, Pammal, Kundrathur and Tambaram. The station is the only elevated airport metro station in India. The other airport metro stations in the country such as those in Kolkata, Delhi, Lucknow, Mumbai and the proposed ones at Bangalore and Hyderabad are underground. The station enables rapid transit connectivity with the airport, making Chennai the second city in India after Delhi to achieve this.

== Construction ==
The foundation for the station was laid on 24 May 2012. While the architectural and structural design of the station will be carried out by AAI in consultation with Creative Group, the interiors of the station will be designed by CMRL. The time frame for constructing the metro station is 14 months and the work has been awarded to URC Construction Company Private Limited, Erode, at a cost of ₹ 480 million.

By the end of July 2014, the structural work on the station was completed.

== The station ==
The station building is a five-level terminal with a basement, ground floor, metro ground floor, concourse, and a platform. The station spans 17,300 square meters. To help passengers alight directly from the international and domestic terminals, the concourse of the station will be linked to the glass connector tube that will connect the two terminals. The station will be an RCC shell structure building with self-supported secret fix aluminium roofing.

The station is one of the few in the corridor that will have parking facilities.

== Station layout ==
| G | Street level | Exit/Entrance |
| L1 | Mezzanine | Fare control, station agent, Metro Card vending machines, crossover |
| L2 | Side platform | Doors will open on the left |
| L2 | Platform 1 Southbound | Towards → Train Terminates Here (to be further extended to Kilambakkam in the future) |
| L2 | Platform 2 Northbound | Towards ← Wimco Nagar Depot; Next Station: Meenambakkam |
| L2 | Side platform | Doors will open on the left |
| L2 |

== Traffic ==
As of December 2019, about 9,000 passengers board trains at the metro station, up from about 6,500 passengers in February 2019, making it the third busiest Metro stations in Chennai, after Thirumangalam and Chennai Central.

== See also ==
- List of Chennai metro stations
- Chennai International Airport
- IGI Airport metro station
