= Poonamallee Government Hospital metro station =

Chennai Metro's Yellow Line metro station

Poonamallee Government Hospital

- Poonamallee Government Hospital metro station

General information
- Location: Trunk Rd, Poonamallee, Tiruvallur, Chennai, Tamil Nadu 600056
- Coordinates: 13.04978°N 80.10218°E
- System: Chennai Metro station
- Owner: Chennai Metro Rail Limited (CMRL)
- Operator: Chennai Metro
- Line: Yellow Line
- Platforms: Island platform Platform-1 → Poonamallee Bypass; Platform-2 → Vadapalani * * (Further extension to Lighthouse in the future)
- Tracks: 2

Construction
- Structure type: Elevated, Double track
- Platform levels: 2
- Accessible: Yes

Other information
- Status: Staffed and Operational

History
- Opening: 11 October 2026; 11 days ago
- Electrified: Single phase 25 kV, 35 Hz AC through overhead catenary
- Former names: Mullaithottam

Services
Preceding station	Chennai Metro	Following station
Poonamallee Bus Stand towards Poonamallee Bypass	Yellow Line (Operational)	Karayanchavadi towards Vadapalani
Poonamallee Bus Stand towards Poonamallee Bypass	Yellow Line (Lighthouse - Around Dec 2027)	Karayanchavadi towards Lighthouse
Poonamallee Bus Stand towards Parandur Airport	Yellow Line (Extension in the future)	Karayanchavadi towards Lighthouse
Route map
Location

Poonamallee Government Hospital metro station (formerly known as Mullaithottam) is a elevated metro station on the East-West Corridor of the Yellow Line of Chennai Metro in Chennai, India. This metro station is among the 30 stations of Corridor IV and 18 elevated stations along Corridor IV of the Chennai Metro, Poonamallee Bypass–Lighthouse stretch.

This metro station was inaugurated by the honourable Prime Minister Narendra Modi along with the Chief Minister C. Joseph Vijay on October 11, 2026, as part of the Phase 1 of Yellow Line.

== History ==
In January 2021, Chennai Metro Rail Limited (CMRL) began the bidding process for the construction of this Poonamallee Government Hospital metro station, that spans between Poonamallee Bypass and Porur Junction, a 7.945 km segment forming Corridor 4 within Phase 2 of the Chennai Metro project.

The contract, designated as Package C4-ECV-02, drew prominent interest from a number of prominent infrastructure firms, including Larsen & Toubro (L&T), Tata Projects, Afcons Infrastructure, and lastly with ITD Cementation India Ltd. Following a quite thorough evaluation of all of the technical submissions along with financial bids, Larsen & Toubro (L&T) was declared the lowest bidder, with its proposal meeting both engineering requirements along with cost parameters set by CMRL. Subsequently, the contract was awarded in full to them.

The construction of the station began in 2021. The construction is being funded by Asian Infrastructure Investment Bank. Following the award, they initiated work in line with the project's approved blueprint and execution plan.

== Station layout ==
Station Layout

G	Street level	Exit/Entrance
L1	Mezzanine	Fare control, station agent, Ticket/token, shops
L2	Platform 2 Eastbound	Towards → Vadapalani * Next Station: Karayanchavadi
L2	Island platform | Doors will open on the right
L2	Platform 1 Westbound	Towards ← Poonamallee Bypass ** Next Station: Poonamallee Bus Stand
L2	Note:	Further extension to * Lighthouse and ** Parandur Airport in the future

== See also ==
- List of Chennai metro stations
- Railway stations in Chennai
- Transport in Chennai
- Urban rail transit in India
- List of metro systems
