= Thelliyaragaram metro station =

Chennai Metro's Yellow Line metro station

Thelliyaragaram

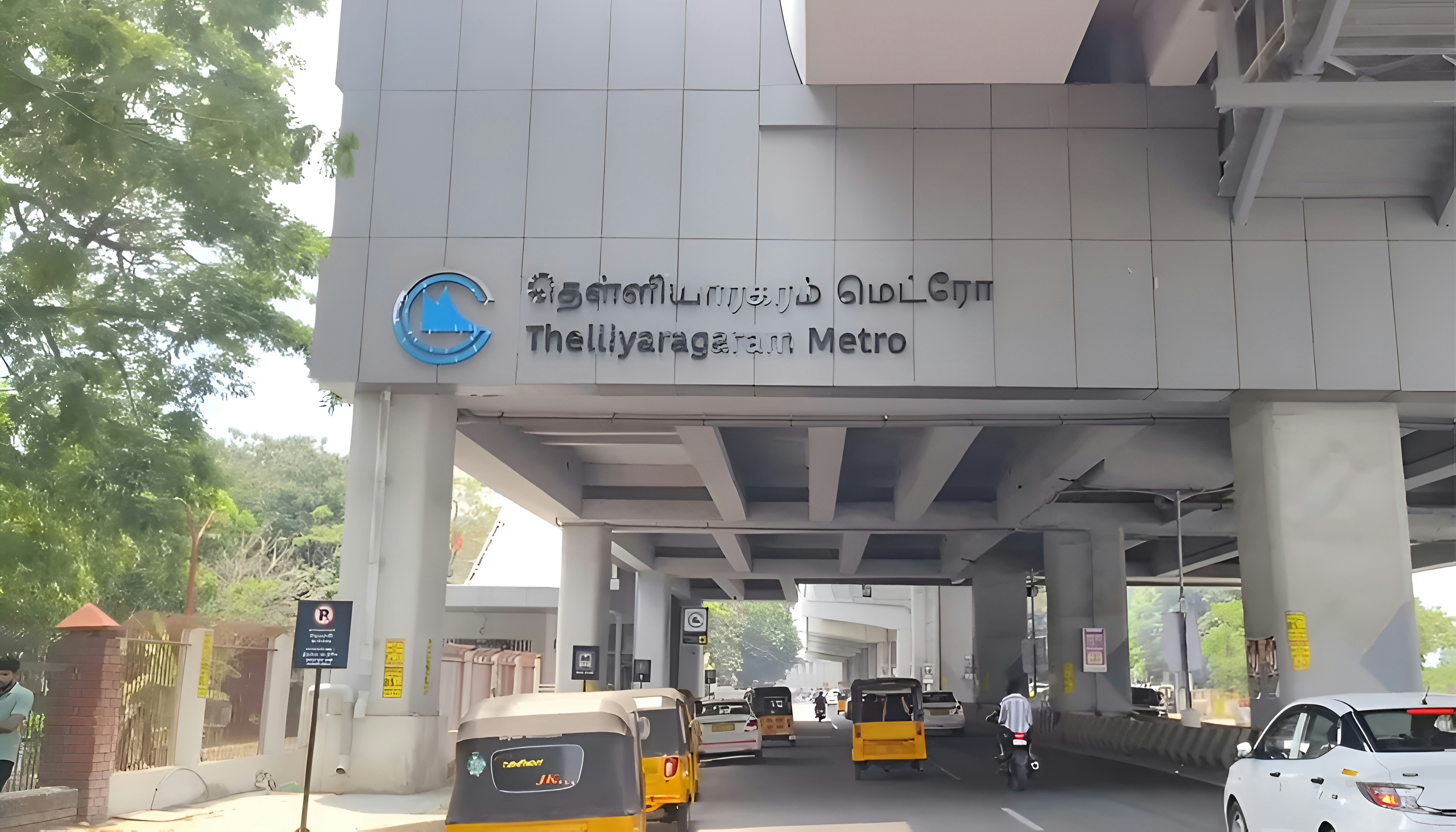
- Thelliyaragaram metro station

General information
- Coordinates: 13.03691°N 80.14173°E
- System: Chennai Metro station
- Owner: Chennai Metro Rail Limited (CMRL)
- Operator: Chennai Metro
- Line: Yellow Line
- Platforms: Island platforms Platform-1 → Poonamallee Bypass; Platform-2 → Vadapalani * * (Further extension to Lighthouse in the future)
- Tracks: 2

Construction
- Structure type: Elevated, Double track
- Platform levels: 2
- Accessible: Yes

Other information
- Status: Staffed and Operational

History
- Opened: 11 October 2026; 1 day ago
- Electrified: Single phase 25 kV, 35 Hz AC through overhead catenary

Services
Preceding station	Chennai Metro	Following station
Iyyapanthangal towards Poonamallee Bypass	Yellow Line (Operational)	Porur Bypass towards Vadapalani
Iyyapanthangal towards Poonamallee Bypass	Yellow Line (Lighthouse - Around Dec 2027)	Porur Bypass towards Lighthouse
Iyyapanthangal towards Parandur Airport	Yellow Line (Extension in the future)	Porur Bypass towards Lighthouse
Route map
Location

Thelliyaragaram is an elevated metro station on the East-West Corridor of the Yellow Line of Chennai Metro in Chennai, India. This metro station is among the 30 stations of Corridor IV and 12 underground stations along Corridor IV of the Chennai Metro, Poonamallee Bypass–Lighthouse stretch. This station initially named after Ramachandra Hospital nearby, was changed to Thelliyaragaram metro station.

This metro station was inaugurated by the honourable Prime Minister Narendra Modi along with the Chief Minister C. Joseph Vijay on October 11, 2026, as part of the Phase 1 of Yellow Line.

== History ==
In February 2021, Chennai Metro Rail Limited (CMRL) invited bids for the construction of this Thelliyaragaram metro station along with eight other stations from Poonamallee Bypass to Iyyappanthangal and Porur Bypass stations, in a package.

Upon evaluation, HCC - KEC JV, submitted the most favorable bid in both technical and financial terms and was consequently awarded the contract. They commenced construction of elevated viaducts in accordance with the approved execution framework, marking another milestone in the progress of Corridor 4.

== Station layout ==
Station Layout - To Be Confirmed

G	Street level	Exit/Entrance
L1	Mezzanine	Fare control, station agent, Ticket/token, shops
L2	Platform 2 Eastbound	Towards → Vadapalani * Next Station: Porur Bypass
L2	Island platform | Doors will open on the right
L2	Platform 1 Westbound	Towards ← Poonamallee Bypass ** Next Station: Iyyapanthangal
L2	Note:	Further extension to * Lighthouse and ** Parandur Airport in the future

== See also ==
- List of Chennai metro stations
- Railway stations in Chennai
- Transport in Chennai
- Urban rail transit in India
- List of metro systems
