= Porur Bypass metro station =

Chennai Metro's Yellow Line metro station

Porur Bypass

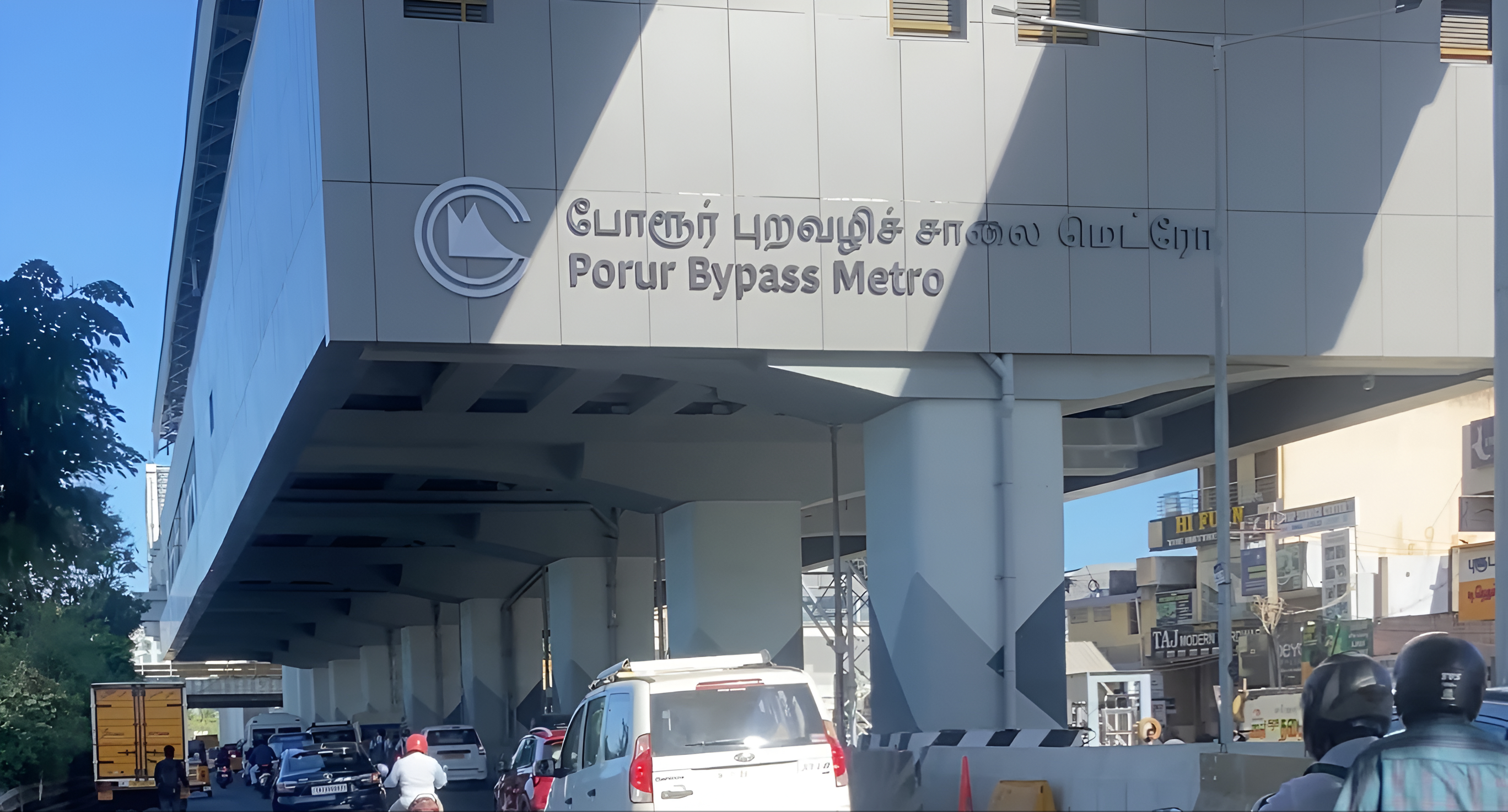
- View of Porur Bypass metro station from Arcot road

General information
- Coordinates: 13.03628°N 80.15017°E
- System: Chennai Metro station
- Owner: Chennai Metro Rail Limited (CMRL)
- Operator: Chennai Metro
- Line: Yellow Line
- Platforms: Island platforms Platform-1 → Poonamallee Bypass; Platform-2 → Vadapalani * * (Further extension to Lighthouse in the future)
- Tracks: 2

Construction
- Structure type: Elevated, Double track
- Platform levels: 2
- Accessible: Yes

Other information
- Status: Staffed and Operational
- Station code: PBP

History
- Opened: 11 October 2026; 25 days ago
- Electrified: Single phase 25 kV, 35 Hz AC through overhead catenary

Services
Preceding station	Chennai Metro	Following station
Thelliyaragaram towards Poonamallee Bypass	Yellow Line (Operational)	Porur Junction towards Vadapalani
Thelliyaragaram towards Poonamallee Bypass	Yellow Line (Lighthouse - Around Dec 2027)	Porur Junction towards Lighthouse
Thelliyaragaram towards Parandur Airport	Yellow Line (Extension in the future)	Porur Junction towards Lighthouse
Route map
Location

Porur Bypass is an elevated metro station on the East-West Corridor of the Yellow Line of Chennai Metro in Chennai, India. This metro station is among the 30 stations of Corridor IV and 12 underground stations along Corridor IV of the Chennai Metro, Poonamallee Bypass–Lighthouse stretch.

This metro station was inaugurated by the honourable Prime Minister Narendra Modi along with the Chief Minister C. Joseph Vijay on October 11, 2026, as part of the Phase 1 of Yellow Line.

== History ==
In February 2021, Chennai Metro Rail Limited (CMRL) invited bids for the construction of Porur Bypass metro station along with eight other stations from Thelliyaragaram to Poonamallee Bypass stations, in a package.

Upon evaluation, HCC - KEC JV, submitted the most favorable bid in both technical and financial terms and was consequently awarded the contract. They commenced construction of elevated viaducts in accordance with the approved execution framework, marking another milestone in the progress of Corridor 4.

== Station layouts ==
Station Layout

G	Street level	Exit/Entrance
L1	Mezzanine	Fare control, station agent, Ticket/token, shops
L2	Platform 2 Eastbound	Towards → Vadapalani * Next Station: Porur Junction
L2	Island platform | Doors will open on the right
L2	Platform 1 Westbound	Towards ← Poonamallee Bypass ** Next Station: Thelliyaragaram
L2	Note:	Further extension to * Lighthouse and ** Parandur Airport in the future

== Entry/Exit ==
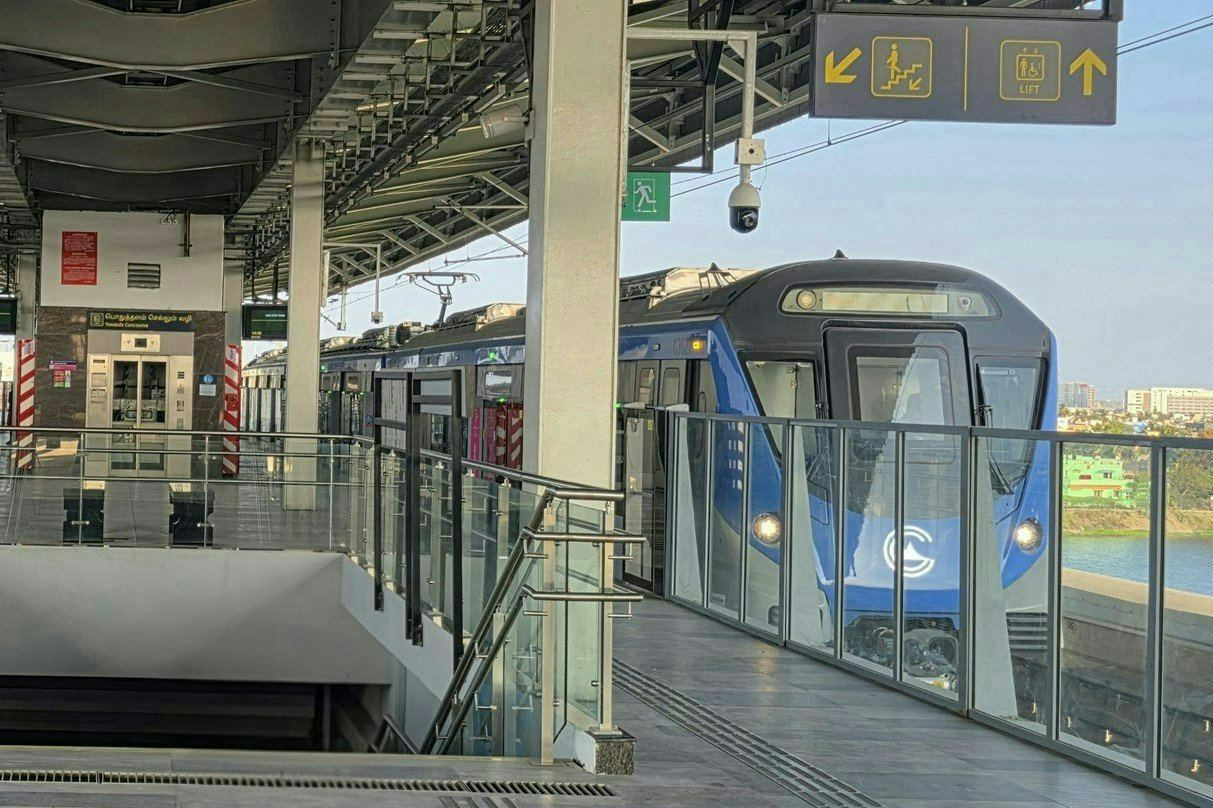
A metro train arriving at the Porur Bypass metro station

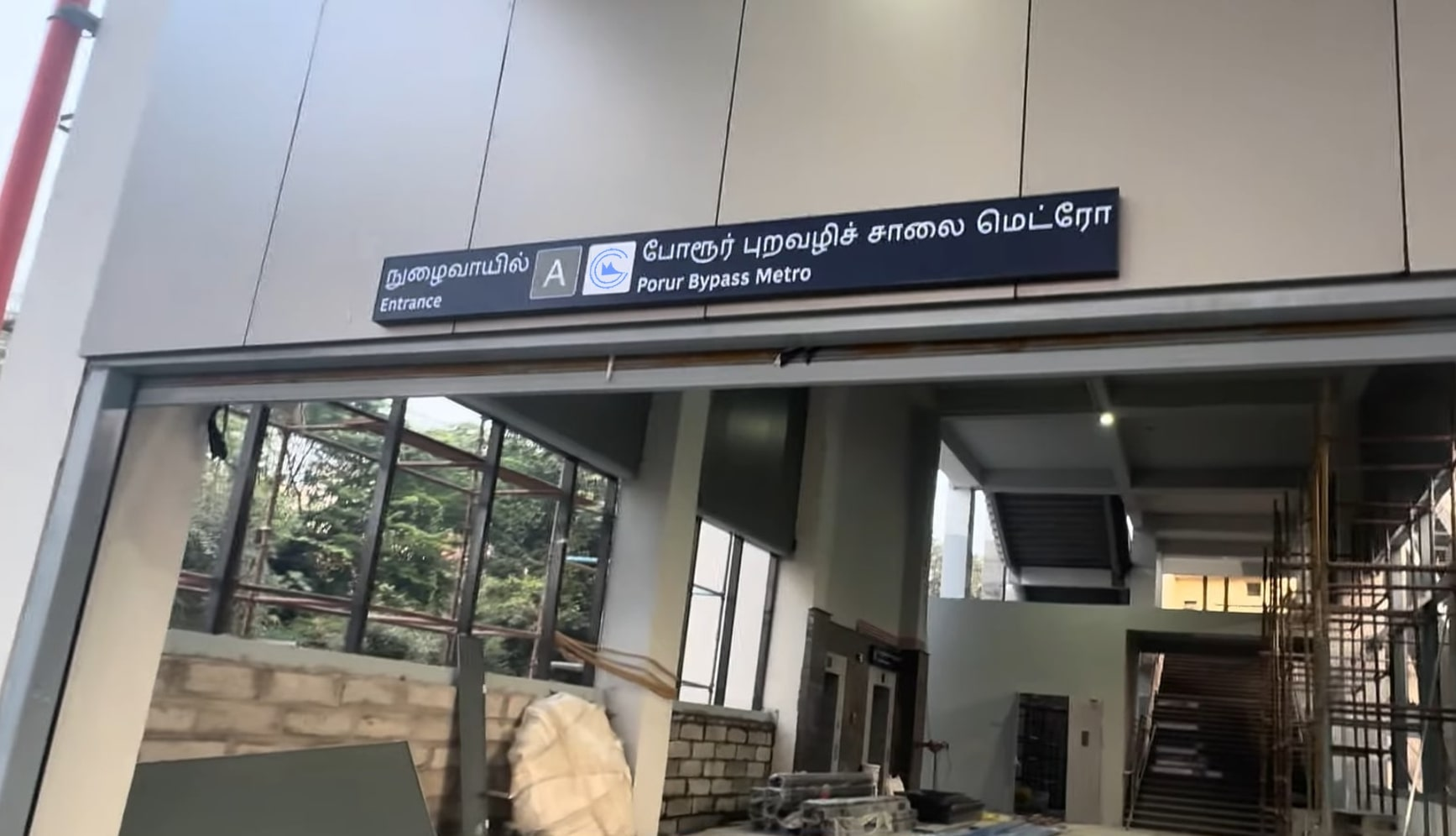
Entrance of Porur Bypass metro station

Porur Bypass metro station will have only one Entry/Exit point (in the direction of Poonamallee towards Porur) rather than two as in case of other metro stations, due to the presence of Porur Lake on the opposite side of the station.

== See also ==
- List of Chennai metro stations
- Railway stations in Chennai
- Transport in Chennai
- Urban rail transit in India
- List of metro systems
