= Poonamallee Bus Stand metro station =

Chennai Metro's Yellow Line metro station

Poonamallee Bus Stand

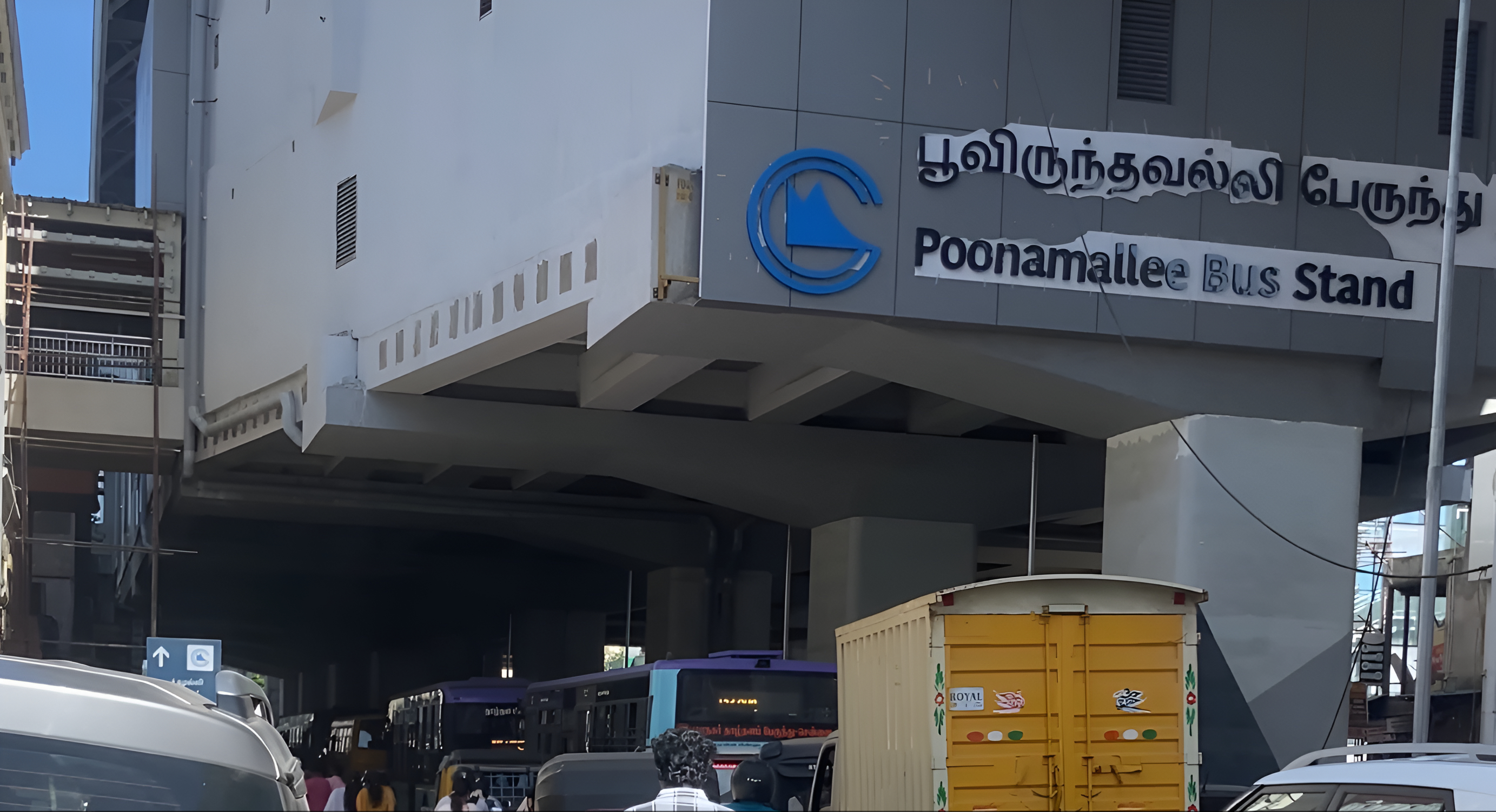
- Poonamallee Bus Stand metro station

General information
- Coordinates: 13.05082°N 80.09550°E
- System: Chennai Metro station
- Owner: Chennai Metro Rail Limited (CMRL)
- Operator: Chennai Metro
- Line: Yellow Line
- Platforms: Side platform Platform-1 → Poonamallee Bypass; Platform-2 → Vadapalani * * (Further extension to Lighthouse in the future)
- Tracks: 2
- Connections: Poonamallee Bus Terminus

Construction
- Structure type: Elevated, Double track
- Platform levels: 2
- Accessible: Yes

Other information
- Status: Staffed and Operational
- Station code: POO

History
- Opened: 11 October 2026; 25 days ago
- Electrified: Single phase 25 kV, 35 Hz AC through overhead catenary

Services
Preceding station	Chennai Metro	Following station
Poonamallee Bypass Terminus	Yellow Line (Operational)	Poonamallee Government Hospital towards Vadapalani
Poonamallee Bypass Terminus	Yellow Line (Lighthouse - Around Dec 2027)	Poonamallee Government Hospital towards Lighthouse
Poonamallee Bypass towards Parandur Airport	Yellow Line (Extension in the future)	Poonamallee Government Hospital towards Lighthouse
Route map
Location

Poonamallee Bus Stand Metro is an elevated metro station on the East-West Corridor of the Yellow Line of Chennai Metro in Chennai, India. This metro station is among the 18 elevated stations of Corridor IV of the Chennai Metro, from Poonamallee Bypass to Lighthouse stretch. This station has connectivity with Poonamallee Bus Terminus, making it a multi-modal hub.

This metro station was inaugurated by the honourable Prime Minister Narendra Modi along with the Chief Minister C. Joseph Vijay on October 11, 2026, as part of the Phase 1 of Yellow Line.

== History ==
In February 2021, Chennai Metro Rail Limited (CMRL) invited bids for the construction of this Poonamallee Bus Stand metro station along with eight other stations from Poonamallee Bypass to Porur Bypass stations, in a package.

Upon evaluation, HCC - KEC JV, submitted the most favorable bid in both technical and financial terms and was awarded the contract. They commenced construction of elevated viaducts in accordance with the approved execution framework, marking another milestone in the progress of Corridor 4.

Construction of the viaducts from Poonamallee to Porur was completed in March 2025, with initial trial runs commencing on the stretch - covering Poonamallee Bypass, this station and the next Poonamallee Government Hospital (Mullaithottam) station. Following conclusion of various trials, inspections and safety checks along the corridor, the operations of this station is set to commence by October 2026.

== Station Layout ==
G	Street level	Exit/Entrance
L1	Mezzanine	Fare control, station agent, Metro Card vending machines, crossover
L2	Side platform | Doors will open on the left
L2	Platform 2 Eastbound	Towards → Vadapalani * Next Station: Poonamallee Government Hospital
L2	Platform 1 Westbound	Towards ← Poonamallee Bypass **
L2	Side platform | Doors will open on the left
L2	Note:	Further extension to * Lighthouse and ** Parandur Airport in the future

== See also ==
- List of Chennai metro stations
- Railway stations in Chennai
- Transport in Chennai
- Urban rail transit in India
- List of metro systems
