= Thirumayilai metro station =

Underground station of the Chennai Metro

Thirumayilai

General information
- Location: Mylapore, Chennai, Tamil Nadu 600004; India
- Coordinates: 13.0368°N 80.2676°E
- System: Chennai Metro station
- Owner: Chennai Metro
- Operator: Chennai Metro Rail Limited (CMRL)
- Line: Purple Line Yellow Line
- Platforms: 2 levels with Side platform each and 1 level with Island platform Platform-1 → Madhavaram Milk Colony; Platform-2 → Poonamallee Bypass; Platform-3 → Lighthouse; Platform-4 → SIPCOT II
- Tracks: 4
- Connections: Thirumayilai

Construction
- Structure type: Underground, Double Track
- Accessible: Yes

Other information
- Website: chennaimetrorail.org

Services
Preceding station	Chennai Metro	Following station
Radhakrishnan Road Junction towards Madhavaram Milk Colony	Purple Line (Under Construction)	Mandaiveli towards SIPCOT 2
Alwarpet towards Poonamallee Bypass	Yellow Line (Under Construction)	Kutchery Road towards Lighthouse
Alwarpet towards Parandur Airport	Yellow Line (Future Service)	Kutchery Road towards Lighthouse
Route map
Location

Thirumayilai metro station is an underground metro station on the Yellow Line of the Chennai Metro. The station is among the underground stations along corridor I of the Chennai Metro, Lighthouse–Poonamallee Bypass stretch. The station serves the neighbourhoods of Mylapore.

The station is a key interchange linking Corridor 3 and Corridor 4 of the Chennai Metro network and, at 115 ft below the ground, will be the deepest metro station in Chennai.

== History ==
Construction began in 2021 and the station remained an engineering challenge during its construction owing to its depth cut through rocky soil. Owing to these difficulties, the station is expected to be completed by 2028.

=== Construction ===
The T-shaped station will be built on four levels with four tunnels stacked one above the other, below the Luz Junction (junction connecting Luz and the Canal Bank Road) in the neighbourhood of Mylapore. Upon construction, the station will be the deepest metro station in Chennai, at 40 meters below street level, surpassing the Chennai Central metro station, which is 30 meters below street level. This is because the rails in corridor 3 run as stacked tunnels, with one track located 17 metres below the ground (first level, or platform 1) and another 40 metres below (third level, or platform 3). The tracks in corridor 4 will be in parallel tunnels (second level, or platform 2) built between platforms 1 and 3.

=== Station layout ===
G	Street level	Exit/Entrance
B1	Mezzanine	Fare control, station agent, Metro Card vending machines, crossover
B2	Side platform | Doors will open on the left
B2	Platform 1 Northbound	Towards → Madhavaram Milk Colony; Next Station: Radhakrishnan Road Junction
B3	Platform # Westbound	Towards ← Poonamallee Bypass ** Next Station: Alwarpet
B3	Island platform | P# & P# doors will open on the left
B3	Platform # Eastbound	Towards → Lighthouse; Next Station: Kutchery Road
B4	Platform 4 Southbound	Towards ← SIPCOT 2 Next Station: Mandaveli
B4	Side platform | Doors will open on the left
B4	Note:	** (Further extension to Parandur Airport in the future)

== The station ==
The station will be located at a depth of 35 metres (115 ft) below the ground with four levels, namely, a concourse level and three platform levels. The first (uppermost) level will be at a depth of 17 metres (56 ft) consisting of the Madhavaram–SIPCOT upper track. The middle level will be at a depth of 24 metres (79 ft) and will consist of the Lighthouse–Poonamallee dual lines. The third (lowermost) level will be at a depth of 35 metres (115 ft) consisting of the Madhavaram–SIPCOT lower track. The station will be spread over an area of 4854.4 square meters. While most other stations in phase II has only two entry/exit points, the Thirumayilai station alone will have five entry/exit points.

== See also ==
- List of Chennai metro stations
- Railway stations in Chennai
- Chennai Mass Rapid Transit System
- Chennai Monorail
- Chennai Suburban Railway
- Transport in Chennai
