= Kutchery Road metro station =

Upcoming Chennai Metro's Yellow Line metro station

Kutchery Road

General information
- Coordinates: 13.03451°N 80.27276°E
- System: Chennai Metro station
- Owner: Chennai Metro Rail Limited (CMRL)
- Operator: Chennai Metro
- Line: Yellow Line
- Platforms: Island platform Platform-1 → Lighthouse; Platform-2 → Poonamallee Bypass
- Tracks: 2

Construction
- Structure type: Underground, Double track
- Platform levels: 2
- Accessible: Yes

Other information
- Status: Under Construction

History
- Opening: June 2028; 19 months' time (TBC)
- Electrified: Single phase 25 kV, 35 Hz AC through overhead catenary

Services
Preceding station	Chennai Metro	Following station
Thirumayilai towards Poonamallee Bypass	Yellow Line (Operational)	Lighthouse Terminus
Thirumayilai towards Parandur Airport	Yellow Line (Future Service)	Lighthouse Terminus
Route map
Location

Kutchery Road is an upcoming underground metro station on the East-West Corridor of the Yellow Line of Chennai Metro in Chennai, India. This metro station will be among the 30 stations of Corridor IV and 12 underground stations along Corridor IV of the Chennai Metro, Poonamallee Bypass–Lighthouse stretch. This metro station is slated to be commercialized on June 2028.

== History ==
In February 2021, Chennai Metro Rail Limited (CMRL) initiated the bidding process for the construction of this Kutchery Road metro station, which falls within the underground stretch from Light House to Bharathidasan Road, forming part of Corridor 4 under Phase 2 of the Chennai Metro project.

Apart from this metro station, this package includes three other stations, namely Light House, Alwarpet, and Bharathidasan Road. The tender attracted competitive bids from major infrastructure firms including ITD Cementation India Ltd., Larsen & Toubro (L&T), Gulermak, Shanghai Tunnel Engineering Co. Ltd. (STEC), and a joint venture of J Kumar Infraprojects–Patel Infrastructure.

After careful technical and financial assessment, ITD Cementation India Ltd. emerged as the lowest bidder and was awarded the contract. The company commenced civil construction activities, including site clearance and preparatory excavation, aligned with the project’s underground engineering specifications.

== Station layout ==
Station Layout - To Be Confirmed

G	Street level	Exit/Entrance
L1	Mezzanine	Fare control, station agent, Ticket/token, shops
L2	Platform 1 Eastbound	Towards → Lighthouse
L2	Island platform | Doors will open on the right
L2	Platform 2 Westbound	Towards ← Poonamallee Bypass ** Next Station: Thirumayilai; Change at the next station for Purple Line
L2	Note:	** (Further extension to Parandur Airport in the future)

== See also ==
- List of Chennai metro stations
- Railway stations in Chennai
- Transport in Chennai
- Urban rail transit in India
- List of metro systems
