= High Court metro station =

Chennai Metro's Blue Line metro station

High Court

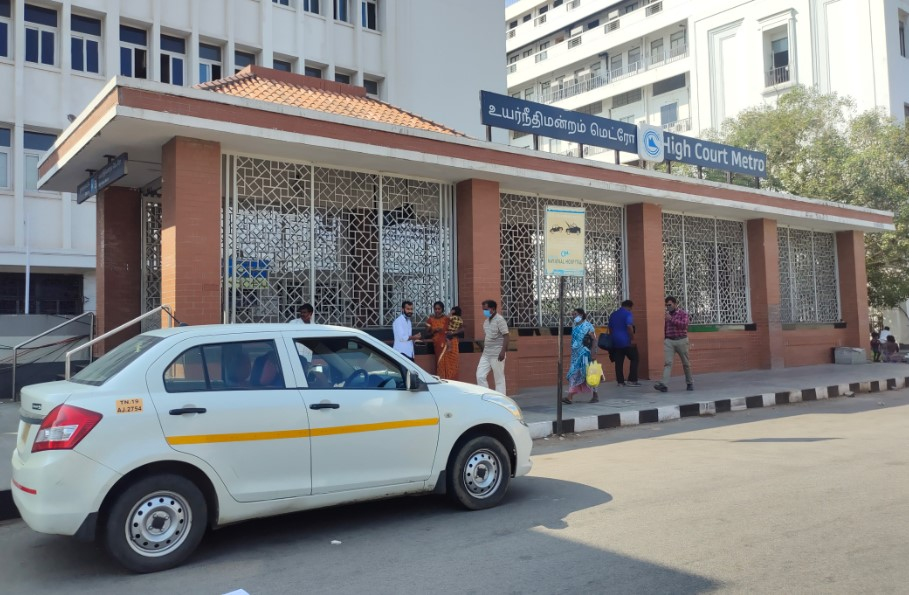

General information
- Location: Esplanade Rd, Parrys, George Town, Chennai, Tamil Nadu 600104; India
- Coordinates: 13°05′14″N 80°17′06″E
- System: Chennai Metro station
- Owner: Chennai Metro
- Operator: Chennai Metro Rail Limited (CMRL)
- Line: Blue Line Yellow Line
- Platforms: Island platform Platform-1 → Chennai International Airport (to be extended to Kilambakkam in the future); Platform-2 → Wimco Nagar Depot
- Tracks: 2
- Connections: Broadway bus terminus

Construction
- Structure type: Underground, Double Track
- Parking: No
- Accessible: Yes
- Architectural style: Chennai Metro

Other information
- Station code: SHC

History
- Opened: 10 February 2019; 7 years ago
- Electrified: Single phase 25 kV, 50 Hz AC through overhead catenary

Services
Preceding station	Chennai Metro	Following station
Mannadi towards Wimco Nagar Depot	Blue Line	Chennai Central towards Chennai International Airport
Mannadi towards Wimco Nagar Depot	Blue Line (Future Service)	Chennai Central towards Kilambakkam
Terminus	Yellow Line Proposed	State Secretariat towards Lighthouse or Poonamallee Bypass
Route map
Location

High Court is an underground metro station on the North-South Corridor of the Blue Line of Chennai Metro in Chennai, India. The station serves the neighbourhoods of George Town, chiefly Parry's Corner. This station is named so because of the presence of the Madras High Court in the vicinity. This station was opened for public on 10 February 2019. However, some portions of the construction work remains incomplete on the date of inauguration.

== Station layout ==
G	Street level	Exit/Entrance
M	Mezzanine	Fare control, station agent, Ticket/token, shops
P	Platform 1 Southbound	Towards → Chennai International Airport; Next Station: M.G.R. Chennai Central Change at the next station for Green Line (to be further extended to Kilambakkam under Blue Line in the future)
P	Island platform | Doors will open on the right
P	Platform 2 Northbound	Towards ← Wimco Nagar Depot; Next Station: Mannadi

High Court metro station
- Interactive map of the High Court metro station area

General information
- Status: Completed
- Type: Metro station
- Location: Esplanade Rd, Chennai, India
- Completed: 2019
- Opened: 10 February 2019
- Inaugurated: 10 February 2019

Design and construction
- Main contractor: L&T-SUCG JV

Website
- http://chennaimetrorail.org/

=== Facilities ===
List of available ATM at High Court metro station are

== Connections ==
=== Bus ===
Metropolitan Transport Corporation (Chennai) bus routes number 11, 11G, 15C, 15D, 15FCT, 15G, 17E, 17K, 20A, 20C, 20M, 20N, 21, 6EXTN, 42D, 50, 64B, 64C, 71C, 71D, 71E, 71H, 109, 120, 120A, 120GS, 120NS, B18, M15LCT serves the station from nearby Broadway bus stand.

=== Rail ===
Chennai Fort railway station

=== Share Transport ===
High Court Metro is connected by share autos covering locations like Mannadi metro station, Monegar Choultry (MC Road), Chennai Beach railway station

== Entry/Exit ==
High Court metro station Entry/exits
Gate No-A1	Gate No-A2	Gate No-A3	Gate No-A4

== See also ==
- Chennai
- Chetput (Chennai)
- Chetput Lake
- List of Chennai metro stations
- Chennai Metro
- Railway stations in Chennai
- Chennai Mass Rapid Transit System
- Chennai Monorail
- Chennai Suburban Railway
- Chetput railway station
- Chennai International Airport
- Transport in Chennai
- Urban rail transit in India
- List of metro systems
