= Porur Junction metro station =

Chennai Metro's Yellow Line metro station

Porur Junction

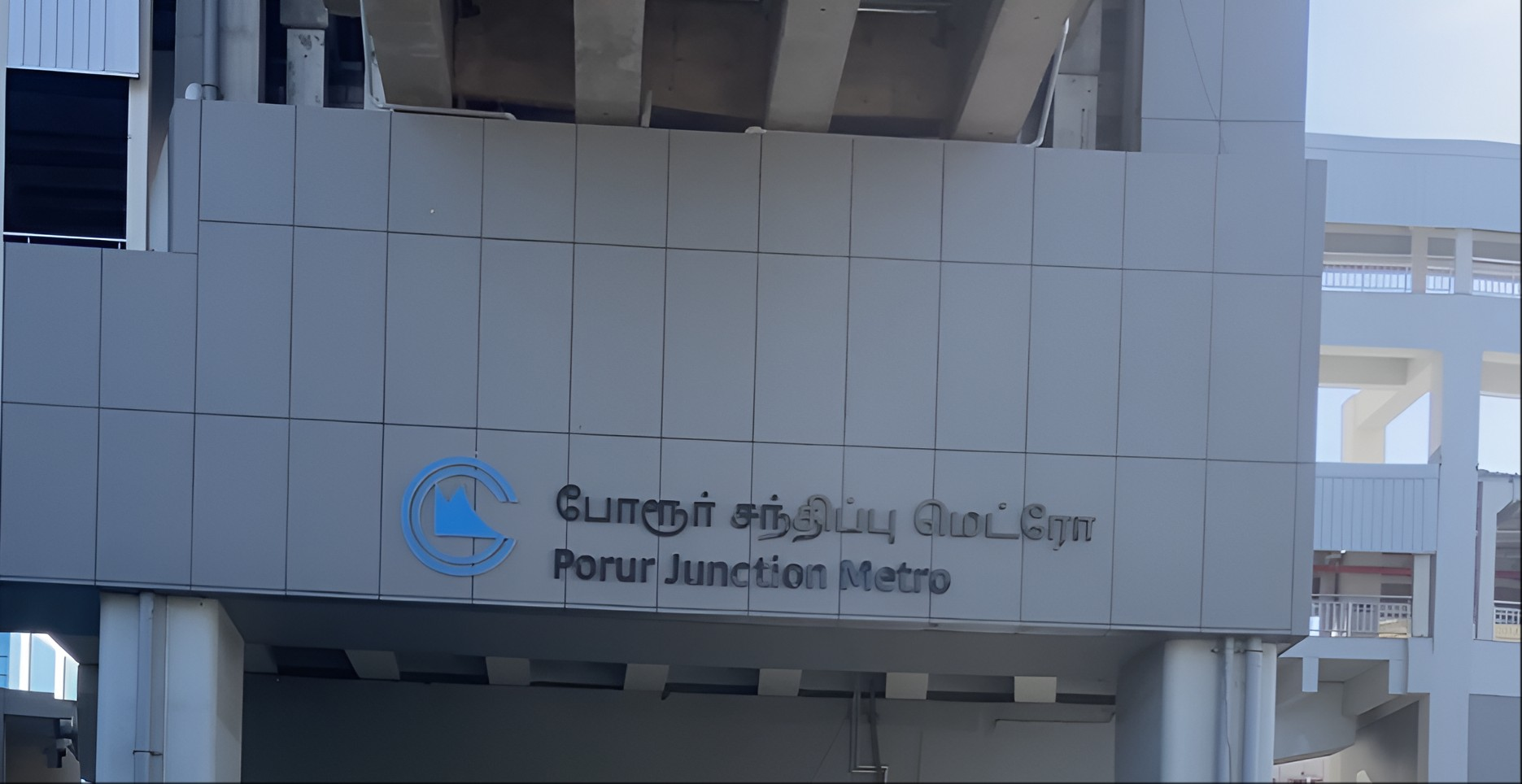
- Porur Junction station, viewed from Arcot road

General information
- Coordinates: 13.03587°N 80.15683°E
- System: Chennai Metro station
- Owner: Chennai Metro Rail Limited (CMRL)
- Operator: Chennai Metro
- Line: Yellow Line
- Platforms: Side platform Platform-1 → Poonamallee Bypass; Platform-2 → Vadapalani * * (Further extension to Lighthouse in the future)
- Tracks: 2

Construction
- Structure type: Elevated, Double track
- Platform levels: 2
- Accessible: Yes

Other information
- Status: Staffed and Operational
- Station code: PRJ

History
- Opened: 11 October 2026; 27 days ago
- Electrified: Single phase 25 kV, 35 Hz AC through overhead catenary

Services
Preceding station	Chennai Metro	Following station
Porur Bypass towards Poonamallee Bypass	Yellow Line (Operational)	Vadapalani Terminus
Porur Bypass towards Poonamallee Bypass	Yellow Line (Operational around Q2 of 2027)	Alapakkam towards Vadapalani
Porur Bypass towards Poonamallee Bypass	Yellow Line (Lighthouse - Around Dec 2027)	Alapakkam towards Lighthouse
Porur Bypass towards Parandur Airport	Yellow Line (Extension in the future)	Alapakkam towards Lighthouse
Train services from Poonamallee Bypass to Vadapalani' will skip Alapakkam ,Karambakkam , Valasaravakkam, Alwarthirunagar ,Virugambakkam South, Saligramam' and proceed towards Vadapalani
Route map
Location

Porur Junction metro station is an important elevated metro station on the East-West Corridor of the Yellow Line of Chennai Metro in Chennai, India. This metro station is among the 30 elevated stations of Corridor IV and 12 underground stations along Corridor IV of the Chennai Metro, Poonamallee Bypass–Lighthouse stretch.

This metro station was inaugurated by the honourable Prime Minister Narendra Modi along with the Chief Minister C. Joseph Vijay on October 11, 2026, as part of the Phase 1 of Yellow Line.

== History ==
In 2020, Larsen & Toubro (L&T) was awarded the contract for construction of stations from Porur Junction to Kodambakkam Powerhouse with the construction commencing from then. As MGR flyover passes close to this station, steel beams were placed above to connect to Poonamallee. The work on Porur station was almost completed in March 2025 along with the next set of stations from Porur Bypass to Poonamallee Bypass. Trial runs are conducted since June 2025 and the line is set for opening by end of the year.

== Station layout ==
Station Layout

G	Street level	Exit/Entrance
L1	Mezzanine	Fare control, station agent, Metro Card vending machines, crossover
L2	Side platform | Doors will open on the left
L2	Platform 2 Eastbound	Towards → Vadapalani * Next Station: Alapakkam; Change at the next station for Red Line
L2	Platform 1 Westbound	Towards ← Poonamallee Bypass ** Next Station: Porur Bypass
L2	Side platform | Doors will open on the left
L2	Note:	Further extension to * Lighthouse and ** Parandur Airport in the future

== See also ==
- List of Chennai metro stations
- Railway stations in Chennai
- Transport in Chennai
- Urban rail transit in India
- List of metro systems
