= Mannadi metro station =

Chennai Metro's Blue Line metro station

Mannadi

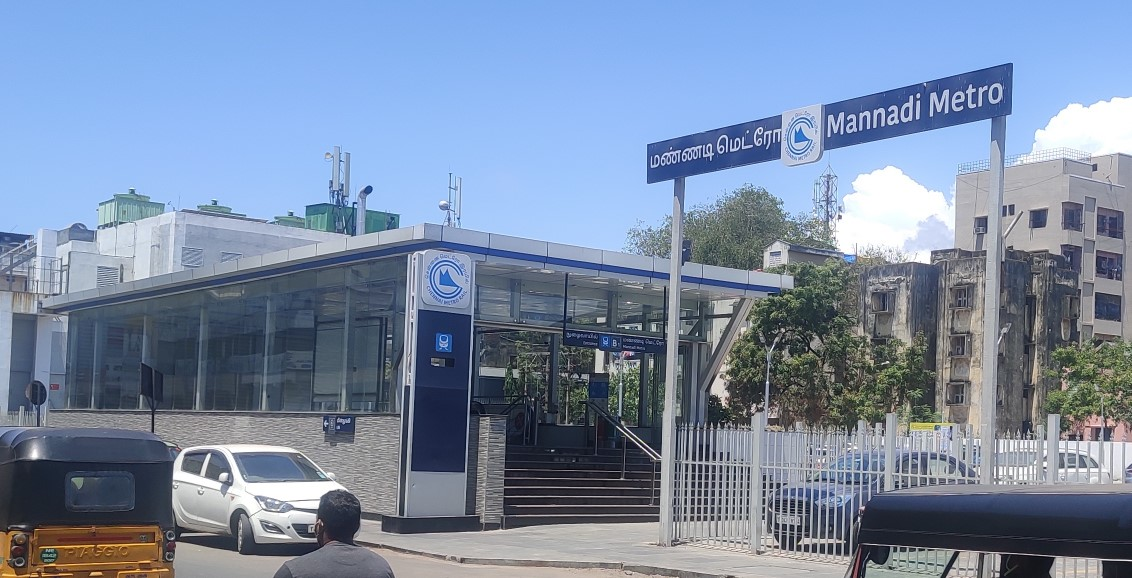

General information
- Location: Manadi Police Colony, George Town, Chennai, Tamil Nadu 600001; India
- Coordinates: 13°05′42″N 80°17′08″E
- System: Chennai Metro station
- Owner: Chennai Metro
- Operator: Chennai Metro Rail Limited (CMRL)
- Line: Blue Line
- Platforms: Island platform Platform-1 → Chennai International Airport (to be extended to Kilambakkam in the future); Platform-2 → Wimco Nagar Depot
- Tracks: 2

Construction
- Structure type: Underground, Double Track
- Parking: No
- Accessible: Yes

Other information
- Station code: SMA

History
- Opened: 10 February 2019; 7 years ago
- Electrified: Single phase 25 kV, 50 Hz AC through overhead catenary

Services
Preceding station	Chennai Metro	Following station
Washermanpet towards Wimco Nagar Depot	Blue Line	High Court towards Chennai International Airport
Washermanpet towards Wimco Nagar Depot	Blue Line (Future Service)	High Court towards Kilambakkam
Route map
Location

Mannadi is an underground metro station on the North-South Corridor of the Blue Line of Chennai Metro in Chennai, India. The station serves the neighbourhoods of Mannadi and George Town. This station was opened for public on 10 February 2019. However, some portions of the construction work remains incomplete on the date of inauguration.

== Station layout ==
G	Street level	Exit/Entrance
M	Mezzanine	Fare control, station agent, Ticket/token, shops
P	Platform 1 Southbound	Towards → Chennai International Airport; Next Station: High Court (to be further extended to Kilambakkam in the future)
P	Island platform | Doors will open on the right
P	Platform 2 Northbound	Towards ← Wimco Nagar Depot; Next Station: Washermanpet

=== Facilities ===
List of available ATM at Mannadi metro station are

== Connections ==
=== Bus ===
Metropolitan Transport Corporation (Chennai) bus routes number 32, 32A, 32AGS, 32B, 33,33B,56C,56F serves the station from nearby Loyer Square bus stand as well as Mannadi Metro Bus Stop adjacent to the metro station.

=== Rail ===
Chennai Beach railway station

=== Share Transport ===
Mannadi Metro Station is also served by Share Autos who cover the localities like Monegar Choultry Road (MC Road), Stanley Roundabout and Broadway bus terminus at a nominal fare.

== Entry/Exit ==
Mannadi metro station Entry/exits
Gate No-A1	Gate No-A2	Gate No-A3	Gate No-A4

== See also ==
- Chetput (Chennai)
- Chetput Lake
- List of Chennai metro stations
- Railway stations in Chennai
- Chennai Mass Rapid Transit System
- Chennai Monorail
- Chennai Suburban Railway
- Chetput railway station
- Chennai International Airport
- Transport in Chennai
- Urban rail transit in India
- List of metro systems
