= Molasur =

Village in Tamil Nadu, India

- Village
- Interactive map of Molasur
- Coordinates: 12.9167733°N 79.8612392°E
- Postal code: 602106

Molasur is a village in Kancheepuram District, Tamil Nadu, India, near Sunguvarchathram. It is located 24 km (15 mi) east of the district headquarters of Kanchipuram, 5 km (3.1 mi) from Sriperumbudur, and 50 km (31 mi) from the state capital Chennai. Molasur is administered by a village panchayat. Sogandi and Nandimedu are nearby villages belonging to Molasur Panchayat.

.

== Economy ==
Traditionally, the economy of the village had been based on local merchandise and agriculture. A few notable (Ex Panchayat Presidents and Councilors) people rich and had double floor bungalows and cars, assets, and properties on the road front. Most of the landlords were from the upper castes and most of the Thiruvallur Main Road front properties are occupied by Telugu-speaking castes, like Telugu Chettiyars, Reddyar and Naidus,. Most of them were moneylenders. New economic policies were adopted by nearby companies, like Flextronics. After that, the growth of the local economy drastically Decreased. Most of the people were educated and worked in multinational corporations. Few people worked for government bodies and Most of the women's shop less selling Fruits and Seasonal food. This new industrialization has helped to reduce the village's crime rate, including robbery and theft. . With the economy growing, land prices increased, leaving the majority of people landless. Landlords began looting public lands and government lands with the help of bureaucrats.

== Transport and Communication ==
Government buses are the primary mode of transportation. Villagers also use motorcycles and cars. The nearby junction for transportation is Sunguvarchathram which is on the Bangalore National Highway. There buses run to [(Pondichery to Tindivanam Buses Available and share autos Available)].

Mobile phones are widely used. Advanced networks like 3G and 4G are widely used in the village.

== Education ==
Education is central to the development of the village. The government school started as an elementary school now middle school but was then upgraded to a High school. After a few years, it became a higher secondary school and it is now a center for public examinations. In the past, Molasur School was the only school for surrounding villages. Students from more than 2 villages studied at this institution. Most of the teachers at the school were Tamil-speaking people. Some of the teachers were able to support talented students by paying their expenses. The Molasur School was built on Government Land.

== Religion ==
The three major religions in the village are Hindu, Islam, and Christianity. Many of the Hindus are meat-eaters, but some abstain from pork or beef.

Since the Hindu people are the original settlers of Molasur village, the caste system divides them and most of the areas are occupied according to their caste. In Odai Theru and Palla Molasur are scheduled castes and tribes; Thriuvallur High Road is occupied by Vanniyars, Mudaliar and Chettiyars; the nearby Ramadoss Theater is inhabited by Acharis (also known as Smiths); the Karumariamman Koil area is occupied by Vaniiyars, and Irular have a separate area nearby Thiruvallur road. In the 1960s, Nadar Hindus from the south of Tamil Nadu migrated for business. Later on, the education and the economy and the Dravidian movements made them unite politically and socially.

At the time of British rule, a group of predominantly Roman Catholic Christians migrated from Andhra and settled in Molasur. St Joseph church festival celebrated on May 1 is the famous festival celebrated in Molasur. Madha koil festival is very famous and all religious people used to participate.

Islamic believers in Molasur migrated from other parts of Tamil Nadu like Idaikazhinaadu (Coastal Mahabalipuram), Vandavasi, Pallapatty, and Attur. There are also a few people from the time of Sultan and Nawab rule who are Urdu speakers. There are two mosques in Molasur and the main mosque is in the junction in Sunguvarchatram. Most Muslims follow the Sunni tradition of Islam and some Urdu speaking Muslims believe in Sufism. Muslims were mostly merchants, butchers and exporters.
