= Yellow Line (Chennai Metro) =

Transit line in Chennai, India

Yellow Line (Line 4)
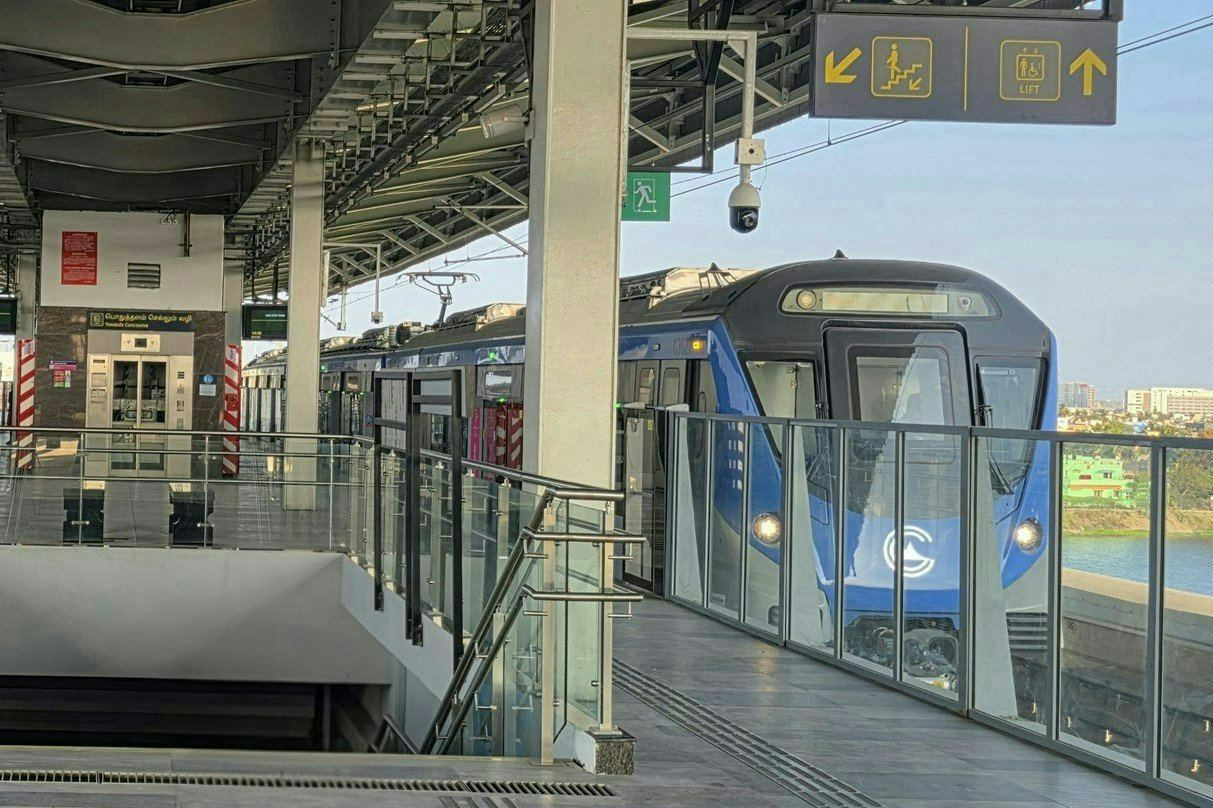
- A train on Yellow Line at Porur Bypass station

Overview
- Native name: மஞ்சள் வழித்தடம்
- Status: Operational
- Locale: Chennai, Tamil Nadu, India
- Termini: Poonamallee Bypass; Lighthouse
- Connecting lines: Operational (1): Green Line; Upcoming (8): Blue Line, Chennai MRTS , Chennai Suburban North Line , Chennai Suburban West Line , Chennai Suburban West North Line, Chennai Suburban South Line Purple Line, Red Line
- Stations: 11 (Operational) + 16 (Under Construction) + 19 (Planned) = 46
- Website: chennaimetrorail.org

Service
- Type: Rapid transit
- System: Chennai Metro
- Operator: Delhi Metro Rail Corporation
- Depot: Poonamallee
- Rolling stock: Alstom

History
- Opened: 11 October 2026; 34 days ago

Technical
- Line length: 26.1 km (16.2 mi)
- Num of tracks: 2
- Character: 10.1 km (6.3 mi) Underground; 16 km (9.9 mi) Elevated
- Track gauge: 1,435 mm (4 ft 8 1/2 in) standard gauge
- Electrification: 25 kV 50 Hz AC overhead catenary
- Signalling: CBTC Signalling System

The Yellow Line or Line 4 is one of the operational lines of Chennai Metro, stretching for 26.1 km (16.2 mi) between Lighthouse and Poonamallee Bypass. The line will consist of 27 stations, out of which nine will be underground and 18 will be at grade or elevated. The colour code of the corridor was changed from Orange to Yellow in 2025. A part of the line was opened to public on 11 October 2026.

== Planning and construction ==
=== Phase II ===
The construction of the first phase of Chennai Metro started in June 2009. Commercial operations started on the green line in June 2015. On 10 February 2019, the extension of blue line was opened, completing the first phase of the metro.

In July 2016, Government of Tamil Nadu announced that the second phase would have three lines totaling 104 km (65 mi) in length with 104 stations. Two corridors would extend from Madhavaram Milk Colony connecting with Siruseri and Sholinganallur respectively with the third corridor connecting Koyambedu with Lighthouse. In July 2017, the state government announced an extension in Phase II, involving an extension of line four from Lighthouse up to Poonamallee with an intersection with the Madhavaram–Sholinganallur line at Alwarthirunagar. The line will extend to 26.1 km (16.2 mi) with 16 km (9.9 mi) elevated and 10.1 km (6.3 mi) underground. It will consist of 30 stations including 12 undergrounds stations. The stations for the second phase were designed to be smaller than the existing stations operational in the first phase.

On 20 November 2020, foundation stone for the second phase was laid and construction commenced. In November 2022, Alstom was awarded the contract to supply metro coaches for the phase II expansion. In May 2023, CMRL announced a revised plan for the second phase. As per the plan, the line will extend for 26.1 km (16.2 mi) with 27 stations.

The second phase is estimated to cost ₹632.46 billion (US$6.8 billion) of which initially ₹47.1 billion (US$500 million) was loaned by Japan International Cooperation Agency. On 14 February 2021, the Prime Minister of India announced that the government has set aside ₹630 billion (US$6.7 billion) for the construction of phase II and further extension.

Prime Minister Shri Narendra Modi flagging off the Poonamallee-Vadapalani elevated stretch of Phase II along with Tamil Nadu Chief Minister C. Joseph Vijay on October 11 2026.

In January 2025, Chennai Metro announced that the operations on Poonamallee Bypass to Vadapalani stretch will start in February 2026, with no intermediate stoppages at stations from Alapakkam to Saligramam. The opening has since been postponed due to Tamil Nadu Assembly election. The stretch was finally opened on 11 October 2026, during Prime Minister Narendra Modi's visit.

Chennai Metro - Phase II
Line Name	Terminals		Length (km)	Stations	Status	Map
Yellow Line	Poonamallee Bypass	Vadapalani	14.6	11	Opened October 11, 2026	
Yellow Line	Poonamallee Bypass	Vadapalani	14.6	6 (Note: Six stations between Porur Junction and Vadapalani are under-construction and will be opened later)	Under construction	
Yellow Line	Vadapalani	Lighthouse	11.5	10	Under construction	

=== Phase II extension ===
In 2022, the state government proposed an extension plan for the fourth line from Poonamalee to Parandur, covering an approximate 52.9 km (32.9 mi). Detailed Project Report (DPR) of the line was prepared and submitted to Government of Tamil Nadu which approved the line in June 2025. This extension would be implemented in 2 phases, from Poonamallee Bypass to Sunguvarchatram in first phase and then to Parandur in second phase. The DPR is currently forwarded to Government of India for final approval. Another extension of the corridor eastward from Lighthouse to High Court is also being planned.

Chennai Metro - Phase II Extension
Line	Terminals		Length	Stations	Status
Yellow Line	Poonamallee	Parandur	52.9 km (32.9 mi)	15	DPR approved by state
Yellow Line	Lighthouse	High Court	7 km (4.3 mi)	4 (TBD)	DPR to be submitted to State

== Stations ==
Chennai Metro Phase 2 Corridor 4
No.	English	Tamil	Status	Expected opening	Connections	Station Type	Platform Level Type
1	Lighthouse	கலங்கரை விளக்கம்	Under Construction	June 2028	Lighthouse (Chennai MRTS)	Underground	Island
2	Kutchery Road	கச்சேரி சாலை	Under Construction	June 2028		Underground	Island
3	Thirumayilai	திருமயிலை	Under Construction	June 2028	Thirumayilai (Chennai MRTS); Purple Line (Under Construction)	Underground	Island
4	Alwarpet	ஆழ்வார்பேட்டை	Under Construction	June 2028		Underground	Island
5	Bharathidasan Road	பாரதிதாசன் சாலை	Under Construction	June 2028		Underground	Island
6	Boat Club	படகு குழாம்	Under Construction	June 2028		Underground	Island
7	Nandanam	நந்தனம்	Under Construction	June 2028	Blue Line	Underground	Island
8	Panagal Park	பனகல் பூங்கா	Under Construction	June 2028		Underground	Island
9	Kodambakkam	கோடம்பாக்கம்	Under Construction	June 2028	Kodambakkam (South Line)	Underground	Island
10	Kodambakkam Powerhouse	கோடம்பாக்கம் பவர்ஹவுஸ்	Under Construction	March 2027		Elevated	Side
11	Vadapalani	வடபழனி	Operational	11 October 2026	Green Line	Elevated	Side
12	Saligramam	சாலிகிராமம்	Under Construction	March 2027		Elevated	Island
13	Virugambakkam South	விருகம்பாக்கம் தெற்கு	Under Construction	March 2027		Elevated	Island
14	Alwar Thirunagar	ஆழ்வார் திருநகர்	Under Construction	March 2027	Red Line (Under Construction)	Elevated	Island
15	Valasaravakkam	வளசரவாக்கம்	Under Construction	March 2027	Red Line (Under Construction)	Elevated	Island
16	Karambakkam	கரம்பாக்கம்	Under Construction	March 2027	Red Line (Under Construction)	Elevated	Island
17	Alapakkam	ஆலப்பாக்கம்	Under Construction	March 2027	Red Line (Under Construction)	Elevated	Island
18	Porur Junction	போரூர் சந்திப்பு	Operational	11 October 2026		Elevated	Side
19	Porur Bypass	போரூர் புறவழிச்சாலை	Operational	11 October 2026		Elevated	Island
20	Thelliyaragaram	தெள்ளியாரகரம்	Operational	11 October 2026	Sri Ramachandra Medical College	Elevated	Island
21	Iyyapanthangal	அய்யப்பன் தாங்கல்	Operational	11 October 2026	Iyyapanthangal Bus Terminus	Elevated	Island
22	Kattupakkam	காட்டுப்பாக்கம்	Operational	11 October 2026		Elevated	Island
23	Kumananchavadi	குமணன்சாவடி	Operational	11 October 2026		Elevated	Island
24	Karayanchavadi	கரையான்சாவடி	Operational	11 October 2026		Elevated	Island
25	Poonamallee Government Hospital	பூவிருந்தவல்லி அரசு மருத்துவமனை	Operational	11 October 2026		Elevated	Island
26	Poonamallee Bus Stand	பூவிருந்தவல்லி பேருந்து நிலையம்	Operational	11 October 2026	Poonamallee Bus Terminus	Elevated	Side
27	Poonamallee Bypass	பூவிருந்தவல்லி புறவழிச்சாலை	Operational	11 October 2026		Elevated	Side

^{§} Under Construction

== See also ==
- List of metro systems
- Rapid transit in India
