= Sunguvarchatram =

Sunguvārchathram Sunguvarchathram
- Electronic city and sipcot area
- Nickname: svc
- Location in Tamil Nadu, India
- Coordinates: 12.9252°N 79.8791°E
- Country: India
- State: Tamil Nadu
- District: Kancheepuram District
- Talukas: Sriperumbudur

Government
  - village panchayat Molasur: S.R.Dominic
  - village panchayat Sāntavelūru: K.S.Babu
  - Village Panchayat Tirumangalam: Vidyakumāri Srīdhar

Population
  - Total: 10,000

Languages
  - Official: Tamil
- Time zone: UTC+5:30 (IST)
- PIN: 602106
- Telephone code: 271
- Vehicle registration: TN-87
- Lok Sabha constituency: Sriperumbudur

Sunguvarchathram is a town in Kancheepuram District, Tamil Nadu falling under Chennai Metropolitan Area.
