= Vadapalani metro station =

Chennai Metro's Green Line and Yellow Line terminal metro station

Vadapalani

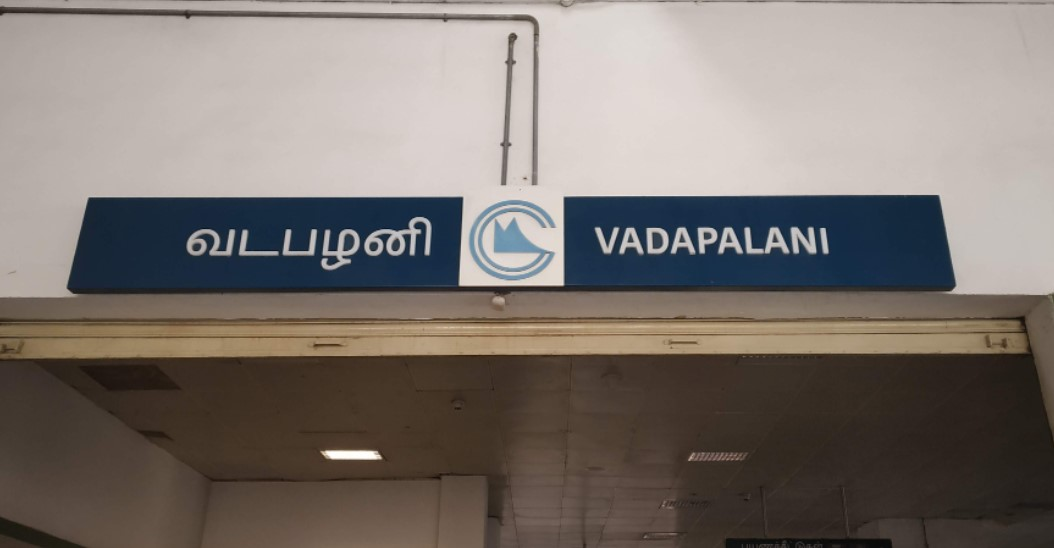

General information
- Location: Vadapalani, Chennai, Tamil Nadu 600026
- Coordinates: 13.05050°N 80.21208°E
- Elevation: 18 metres (59 ft)
- System: Chennai Metro station
- Owner: Chennai Metro
- Operator: Chennai Metro Rail Limited (CMRL)
- Line: Green Line Yellow Line Inter Corridor Line
- Platforms: Side platform Platform-1 → St. Thomas Mount; Platform-2 → M.G.R Chennai Central; Platform-3 → Poonamallee Bypass; Platform-4 → Train Terminates Here * * (Further extension to Lighthouse in the future)
- Tracks: 4

Construction
- Structure type: Elevated, Double track
- Platform levels: 3
- Parking: available
- Cycle facilities: Free bicycle available
- Accessible: Yes

Other information
- Status: Staffed and Operational; Staffed and Operational
- Station code: SVA

History
- Opened: Green Line - June 29, 2015; 11 years ago Yellow Line - 11 October 2026; 10 days ago
- Electrified: Single-phase 25 kV 50 Hz AC overhead catenary

Services
| Preceding station | Chennai Metro | Following station |
|---|---|---|
| Arumbakkam towards Chennai Central | Green Line | Ashok Nagar towards St. Thomas Mount |
| Arumbakkam towards Chennai Central | Blue Line (Inter-Corridor Service) | Ashok Nagar towards Kilambakkam |
| Porur Junction towards Poonamallee Bypass | Yellow Line (Operational) | Terminus |
Train services from Vadapalani to Poonamallee Bypass will skip Saligramam, Virugambakkam South, Alwarthirunagar, Valasaravakkam, Karambakkam, Alapakkam and proceed towards Poonamallee Bypass
| Saligramam towards Poonamallee Bypass | Yellow Line (Operational around Q2 of 2027) | Kodambakkam Powerhouse towards Lighthouse |
| Saligramam towards Parandur Airport | Yellow Line (Extension in the future) | Kodambakkam Powerhouse towards Lighthouse |
Route map
Location

Vadapalani is an elevated interchange metro station on the South-East Corridor of the Green Line of Chennai Metro in Chennai, India. This station serves the neighbourhoods of Vadapalani and Kodambakkam and is one of the major stations on the Koyambedu-Alandur stretch and became operational by early 2015.

== Construction history ==
The station was constructed by Consolidated Constructed Consortium (CCCL). The consolidated cost of the station along with the stations of Koyambedu, Arumbakkam, CMBT, and Ashok Nagar was ₹ 1,395.4 million.

=== Yellow Line ===
This metro station was inaugurated by the honourable Prime Minister Narendra Modi along with the Chief Minister C. Joseph Vijay on October 11, 2026, as part of the Phase 1 of Yellow Line.

== The station ==
The station is an elevated station at the junction of Jawaharlal Nehru Road and Arcot Road. At 16 metres above the street level, the station is the highest elevated station of the Chennai Metro.

According to CMRL, the station was projected to have at least 12,000 people passing through.

=== Station layout ===
| G | Street Level | Exit/Entrance |
| L1 | Mezzanine | Fare control, station agent, Metro Card vending machines, crossover |
| L2 | Side platform | Doors will open on the left |
| L2 | Platform 2 Northbound | Towards → Chennai Central; Next Station: Arumbakkam |
| L2 | Platform 1 Southbound | Towards ← St. Thomas Mount; Next Station: Ashok Nagar |
| L2 | Side platform | Doors will open on the left |
| L3 | Side platform | Doors will open on the left |
| L3 | Platform 4 Eastbound | Towards → Train Terminates Here * Next Station: Kodambakkam Powerhouse |
| L3 | Platform 3 Westbound | Towards ← Poonamallee Bypass ** Next Station: Saligramam |
| L3 | Side platform | Doors will open on the left |
| L3 | Note: | Further extension to * Lighthouse and ** Parandur Airport in the future |

== Connectivity ==
In 2014, Chennai Metro Rail Limited (CMRL) announced plans to connect Vadapalani Metro station with Forum Vijaya mall by means of a service road adjacent to the station.

== Supportive infrastructure ==
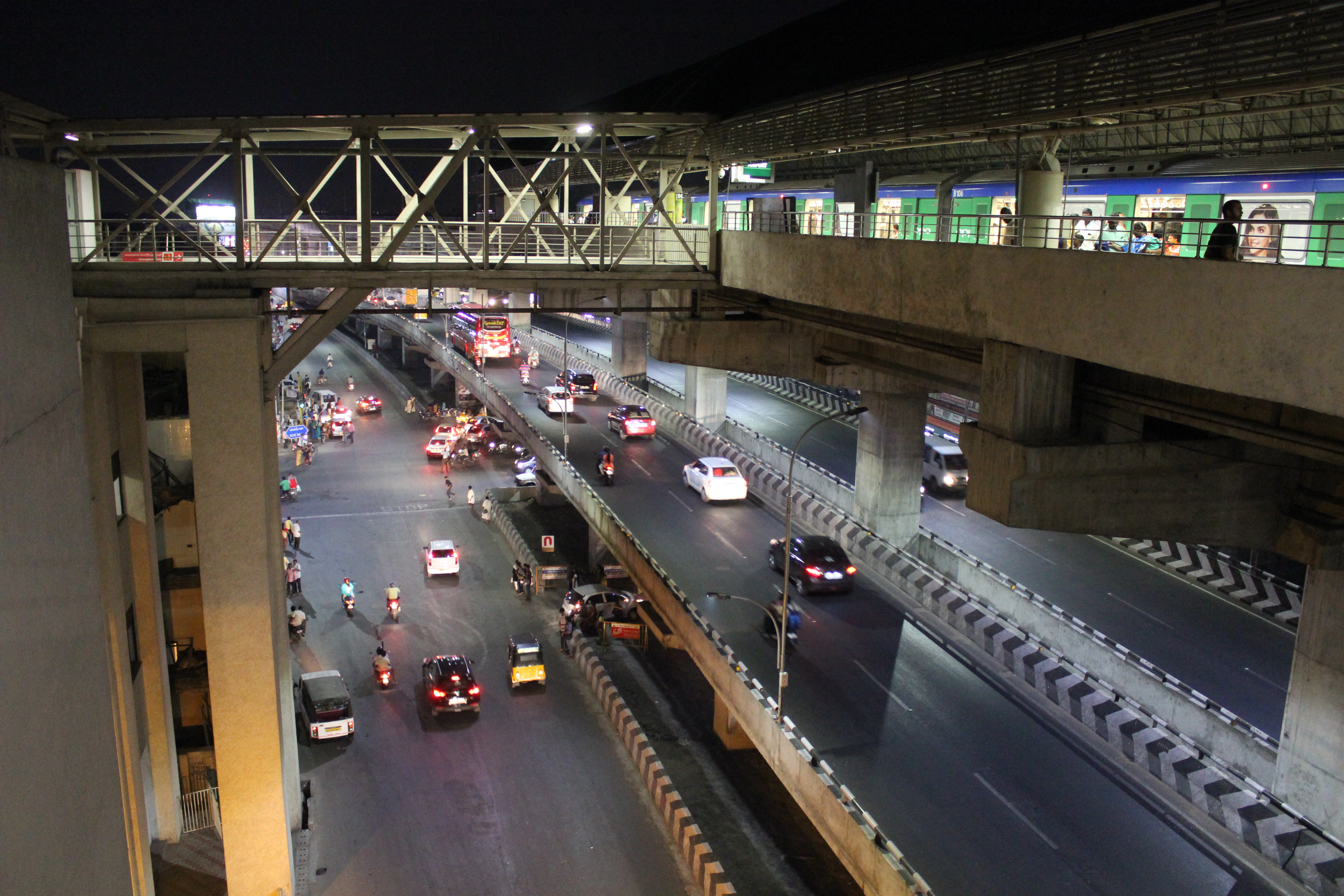
Vadapalani Junction below the Vadapalani Metro station

As of 2013, about 11,000 vehicles pass through the section on Jawaharlal Nehru Salai between Kathipara and Vadapalani and 12,000 vehicles pass through the Vadapalani-Koyambedu section during peak hours. A total of 185,000 vehicles use the road every day.

Along with Koyambedu and Ashok Nagar Metro stations, Vadapalani Metro station will be developed by leasing out space either for shops or office spaces. As part of fire safety measures, underground water tanks of 50,000 to 100,000 litre capacity will be set up at the station.

The station will have an integrated flyover to bypass the junction. The 450-metre-long four-laned flyover will be built at a cost of ₹ 694.3 million and the central portion will be integrated with the Vadapalani Metro rail station. A separate bay will be constructed inside the station to enable MTC buses to drop and pick up passengers.

The flyover is being built jointly by the CMRL and the highways department.

== See also ==
- List of Chennai metro stations
- Chennai Metro
- Railway stations in Chennai
- Chennai Mass Rapid Transit System
- Chennai Monorail
- Chennai Suburban Railway
- Transport in Chennai
- List of metro systems in India
- List of rapid transit systems in India
- List of metro systems
