= Poonamallee Bypass metro station =

Chennai Metro's Yellow Line terminal metro station

Poonamallee Bypass Poonamallee Puravazhichaalai

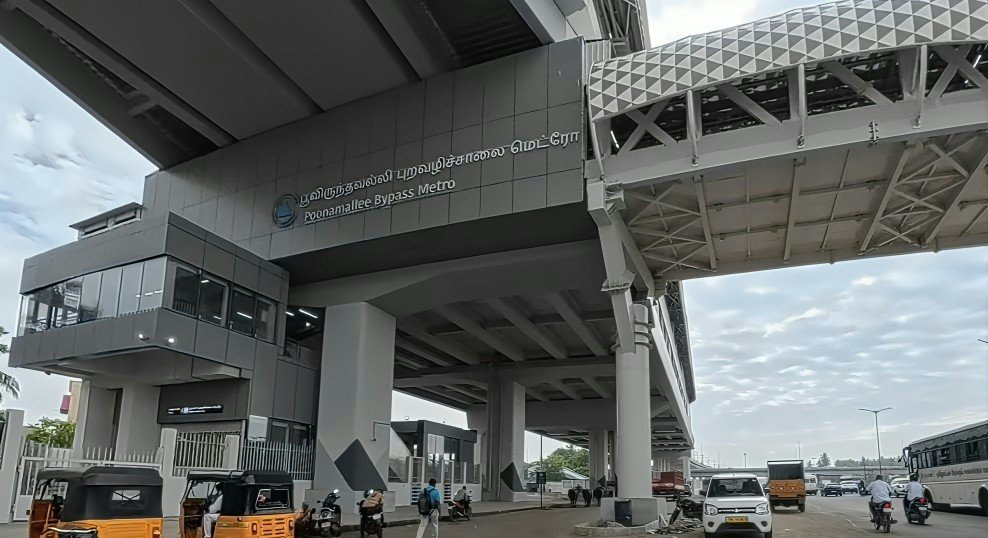
- Entrance of Poonamallee Bypass metro station

General information
- Location: Poonamallee, Chennai, Tamil Nadu 600056; India
- Coordinates: 13.0480°N 80.0818°E
- System: Chennai Metro station
- Owner: Chennai Metro
- Operator: Chennai Metro Rail Limited
- Line: Yellow Line
- Platforms: Side platforms Platform-1 → Train Terminates Here; Platform-2 → Vadapalani * * (Further extension to Lighthouse in the future)
- Tracks: 2

Construction
- Structure type: Elevated, Double track
- Parking: No
- Accessible: Yes

Other information
- Status: Staffed and Operational
- Station code: POB

History
- Opened: 11 October 2026; 25 days ago
- Electrified: Single phase 25 kV, 50 Hz AC through overhead catenary

Services
Preceding station	Chennai Metro	Following station
Terminus	Yellow Line (Operational)	Poonamallee Bus Stand towards Vadapalani
Terminus	Yellow Line (Lighthouse - Around Dec 2027)	Poonamallee Bus Stand towards Lighthouse
Nazarethpet towards Parandur Airport	Yellow Line (Extension in the future)	Poonamallee Bus Stand towards Lighthouse
Route map
Location

Poonamallee Bypass metro station is an elevated western terminal metro station on the Yellow Line of the Chennai Metro. This metro station is among the 30 stations of corridor IV and 18 elevated stations along corridor IV of the Chennai Metro, Poonamallee Bypass–Lighthouse stretch. The station serves the neighbourhoods of Poonamallee.

This metro station was inaugurated by the honourable Prime Minister Narendra Modi along with the Chief Minister C. Joseph Vijay on October 11, 2026, as part of the Phase 1 of Yellow Line.

== History ==
In January 2021, Chennai Metro Rail Limited (CMRL) began the bidding process for the construction of this Poonamallee Bypass metro station, that spans between Poonamallee Bypass and Porur Junction, a 7.945 km segment forming Corridor 4 within Phase 2 of the Chennai Metro project.

The contract, designated as Package C4-ECV-02, drew prominent interest from a number of prominent infrastructure firms, including Larsen & Toubro (L&T), Tata Projects, Afcons Infrastructure, and lastly with ITD Cementation India Ltd. Following a quite thorough evaluation of all of the technical submissions along with financial bids, Larsen & Toubro (L&T) was declared the lowest bidder, with its proposal meeting both engineering requirements along with cost parameters set by CMRL. Subsequently, the contract was awarded in full to them. Construction of the station began in 2021. The construction is being funded by Asian Infrastructure Investment Bank. Following the award, they initiated work in line with the project's approved blueprint and execution plan.

== Depot ==
The Poonamallee Bypass metro station will feature a depot, which will be one of the five depots of the Chennai Metro. Built at a cost of ₹2,250 million, the depot will have 24 tracks and will be used for the repair, maintenance and cleaning of trains and will exclusively serve the trains to be operated on the Poonamallee–Light House stretch. The depot will feature ballast tracks to save on capital expenditure, since laying ballastless track may cost an additional ₹800 to 900 million.

=== Station Layout ===
G	Street level	Exit/Entrance
L1	Mezzanine	Fare control, station agent, Metro Card vending machines, crossover
L2	Side platform | Doors will open on the left
L2	Platform 2 Eastbound	Towards → Vadapalani * Next Station: Poonamallee Bus Stand
L2	Platform 1 Westbound	Towards ← Train Terminates Here **
L2	Side platform | Doors will open on the left
L2	Note:	Further extension to * Lighthouse and ** Parandur Airport in the future

== See also ==
- List of Chennai metro stations
- Railway stations in Chennai
- Transport in Chennai
- Urban rail transit in India
- List of metro systems
