= Lighthouse metro station =

Chennai Metro's upcoming Yellow Line terminal metro station

Lighthouse Metro

General information
- Location: Kamarajar Salai, Mylapore, Chennai, Tamil Nadu
- Coordinates: 13.0417°N 80.2797°E
- System: Chennai Metro station
- Owner: Chennai Metro
- Operator: Chennai Metro Rail Limited (CMRL)
- Line: Yellow Line
- Platforms: Island platforms Platform-1 → Terminus (to be extended to High court in the future) Platform-2 → Poonamallee Bypass (to be extended to Parandur Airport in the future)

Construction
- Structure type: Underground, Double Track

Other information
- Status: Under Construction

History
- Opening: June 2028; 20 months' time (TBC)
- Electrified: Single phase 25 kV, 50 Hz AC through overhead catenary

Services
Preceding station	Chennai Metro	Following station
Kutchery Road towards Poonamallee Bypass	Yellow Line (Under Construction)	Terminus
Kutchery Road towards Parandur Airport	Yellow Line Proposed	Ezhilagam towards High Court
Route map
Location

Lighthouse Metro station is a Metro railway station under construction in Yellow Line of the Chennai Metro Phase-2. The station is one among the 30 stations along Line 4 of the Chennai Metro and one of the 12 underground stations in that corridor. It is the terminal station for the stretch between Lighthouse and Poonamallee Bypass. The station will serve the neighbourhoods of Triplicane, Mylapore, and Santhome.

== History ==
Construction of the station began in 2021. The construction is being funded by Asian Development Bank (ADB). It is expected to open in June 2028.

== Station ==
Lighthouse is an underground metro station situated on Line 4. It will be built at a depth of about 18 to 20 metres below the ground. It will be built at the Dr. Radhakrishnan Salai and Kamarajar Salai junction, beneath the Gandhi statue on the Marina beach.

=== Station layout (TBC) ===
There will be two entrances for the Lighthouse metro station, one of which will be near the lighthouse.

G	Street level	Exit/ Entrance
M	Mezzanine	Fare control, station agent, Ticket/token, shops
P	Platform 1 Northbound	Towards → Train Terminates Here
P	Island platform | Doors will open on the right
P	Platform 2 Southbound	Towards ← Poonamallee Bypass ** Next Station: Kutchery Road
P	Note:	** (Further extension to Parandur Airport in the future)

=== Facilities ===
It was originally estimated that by 2025, about 5,000 people would be using the Lighthouse metro station every day.

== See also ==
- Chennai Metro
- Light House railway station
- List of Chennai metro stations
- Railway stations in Chennai
- Chennai Mass Rapid Transit System
- Chennai Monorail
- Chennai Suburban Railway
- Transport in Chennai
- Urban rail transit in India
- List of metro systems
