= Transport in Chennai =

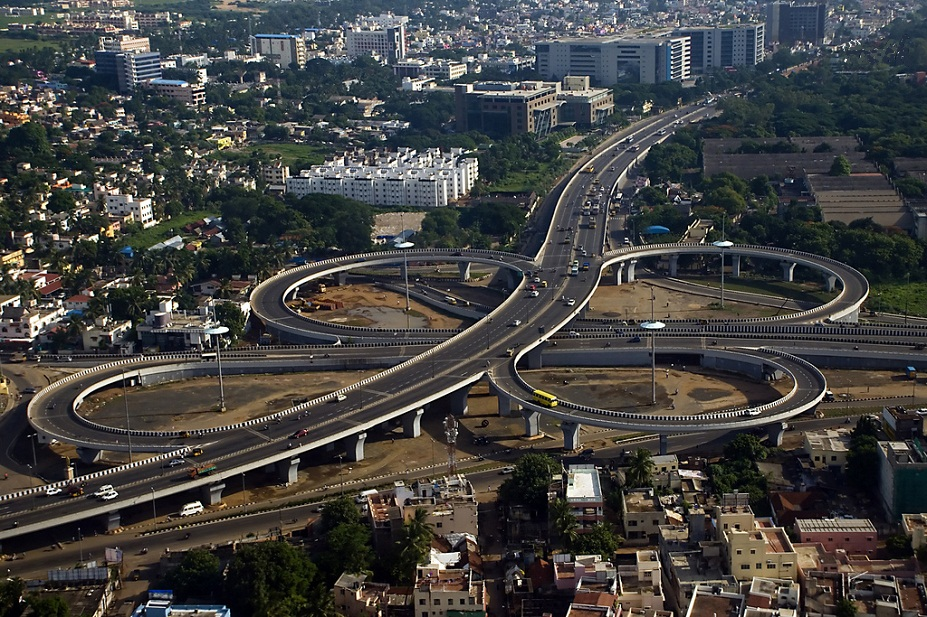
Kathipara Junction—located in Chennai—is the largest cloverleaf interchange in Asia

Transport in Chennai includes various modes of air, sea, road and rail transportation in the city and its suburbs. Chennai's economic development has been closely tied to its port and transport infrastructure, and it is considered one of the best infrastructure systems in India.

== History ==
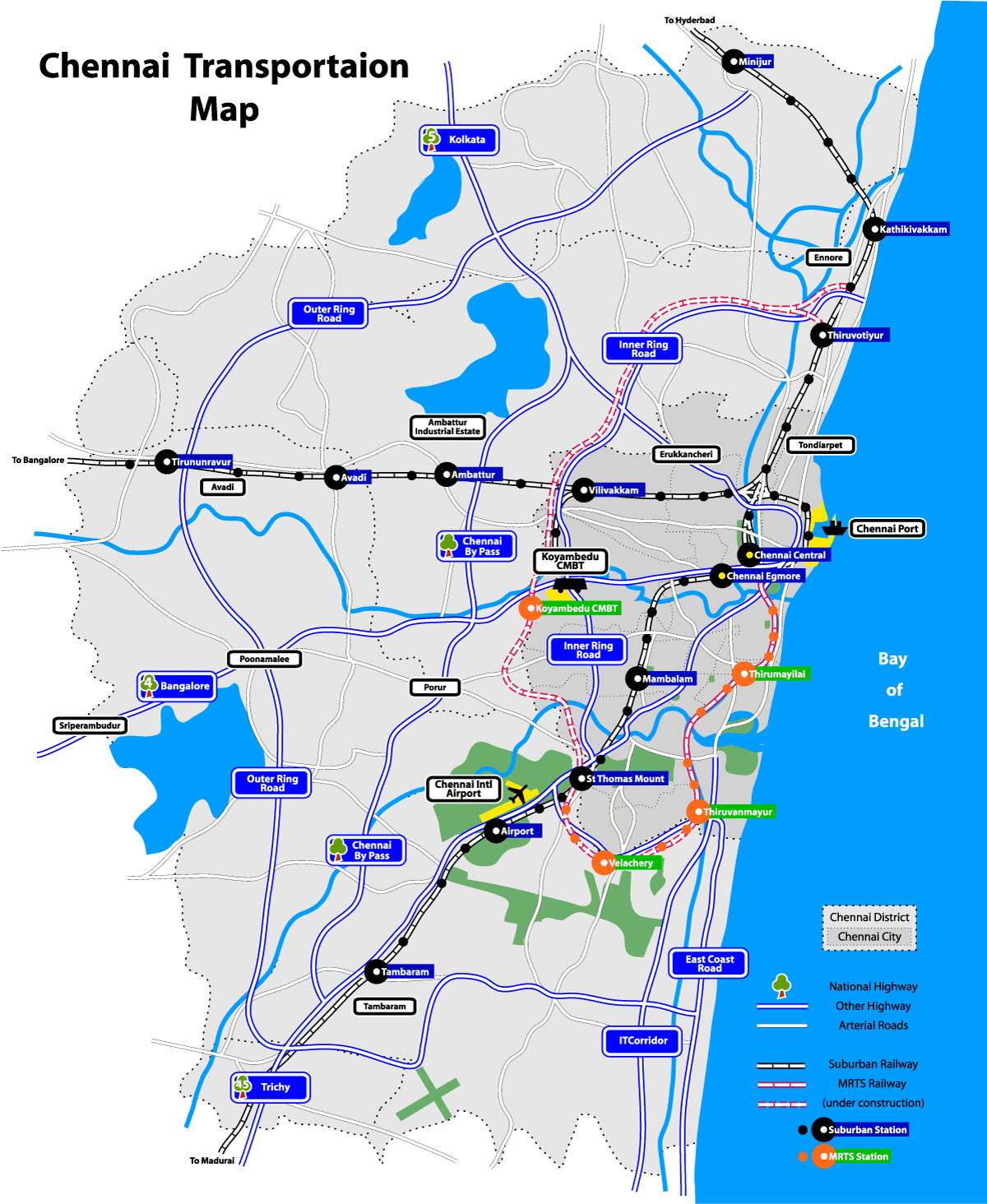
Map of the road and rail transportation network in the Chennai Metropolitan area

The city of Chennai is the birthplace of the railway system in India. In 1831–33, Madras Parliament first came up with the idea. In 1832, the first proposal of railway under the British administration was made in Madras, 21 years before the first operational railway line in India. Later in 1836 A. P. Cotton, a civil engineer in Madras, advocated the construction of a railroad in India.

Meanwhile, in 1835, a short railway line intended to carry granite stones was laid at Chintadripet on an experimental basis, which later became to known as Red Hill Railroad line. Construction on this line began in 1836 and the line was opened in 1837. Despite a few troubles, the line became operational in the same year, with a written report of its functioning since January 1838, thus marking the first rail transport in the country 16 years prior to the running of the first commercial passenger service in India, the Bori Bunder–Thane train with 14 carriages hauled by three locomotives on 16 April 1853. Although the Chintadripet line was primarily intended for wagons hauled by animals, steam locomotives were also operated on the line, one of which is believed to be built in India.

In 1845, Madras Railway Company was mooted, and in 1852 Madras Guaranteed Railway Company was formed. In 1852, the work for laying the first track by Madras Guaranteed Railway Company between Madras and Arcot was started, and in 1856, the first train run between Royapuram and Arcot. In 1895, the first electric trams became operational in the city. The work for suburban train services started in 1928 and became operational in 1931 between Madras Beach and Tambaram with electric multiple units (EMUs). The tram services were withdrawn in 1953. With the operation of the mass rapid transit system (MRTS) between Chennai Beach and Chepauk in 1995, the city is the first to have an elevated track in India.

As of 1 April 2013, the total vehicle population of Chennai is 3,881,850, including 3,053,233 two wheelers.

Growth trend of motor vehicles in the city is listed below:

Transport in Chennai
No.	Year of growth	Total registered vehicles
1.	1981	120,000
2.	1986	228,000
3.	1991	544,000
4.	1996	812,000
5.	1998	975,000
6.	2012	3,760,000
7.	2016	4,757,822
8.	2017	5,309,906
9.	2020	6,016,717

== Transportation in the past ==
Trams

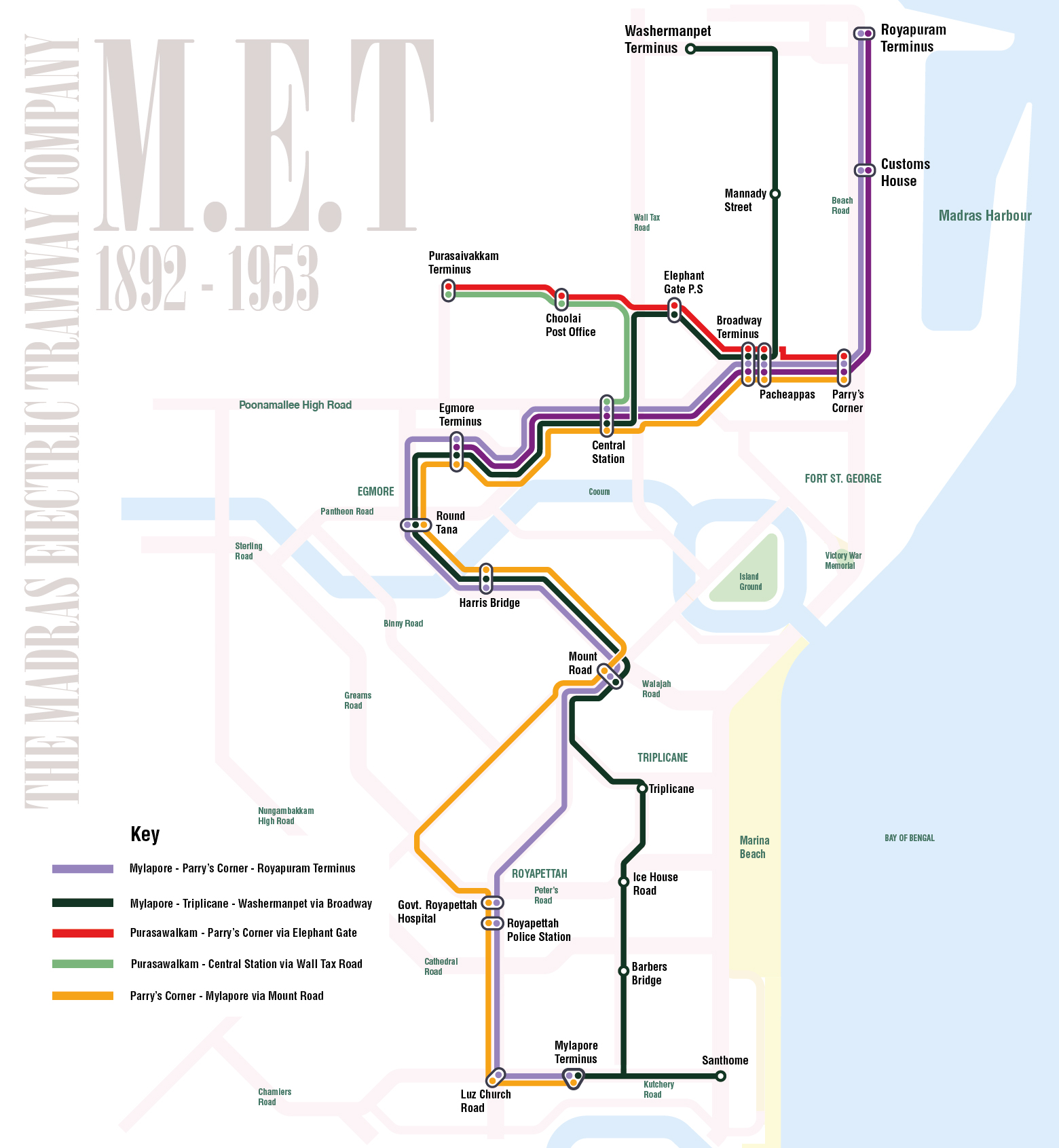
The now-defunct Tram network Chennai operated by The Madras Electric Tramway Company from 1892 to 1953.

Trams were existent in the city for about 67 years starting from the end of the 19th century. The city was home to the first electric trams in India. Trams became a necessary one as the area of the city was widely dispersed with broad avenues radiating from the fort area. The first electric trams became operational in the city on 7 May 1895. Trams were operated between the docks and the inland areas, carrying goods and passengers. The route encompassed Mount Road, Parry's Corner, Poonamallee Road and the Ripon Building. Run by the Madras Electricity System (MES), trams on rails dominated Chennai roads and remained a convenient mode of transport for thousands of riders as it could carry heavy loads. They moved at a maximum speed of just 7 km/h. Two types of trams were in operations—the bigger type measuring about 50 ft in length and the smaller type measuring about 35 ft. A total of 200 commuters could conveniently travel in trams, which had wooden seats to seat 60 passengers. The trams ran on electricity. The original conduit system was replaced by an conventional overhead wire system after a series of destructive monsoons. By 1921, when the tram system was at its peak, there were 24 km of track and 97 cars.

A strike by workers demanding wage revision resulted in a lock-out of the tram company by about 1950. Subsequently, the then Chief Minister C. Rajagopalachari favoured the idea of ending the service, and the tram service came to an end on 12 April 1953. The rails of the tram embedded on roads continued to remain for several years after the withdrawal of the service, since their removal would cost the government a fortune. The contract to remove the tracks and overhead cables was given to Narainsingh Ghanshamsingh.

== Road transportation ==
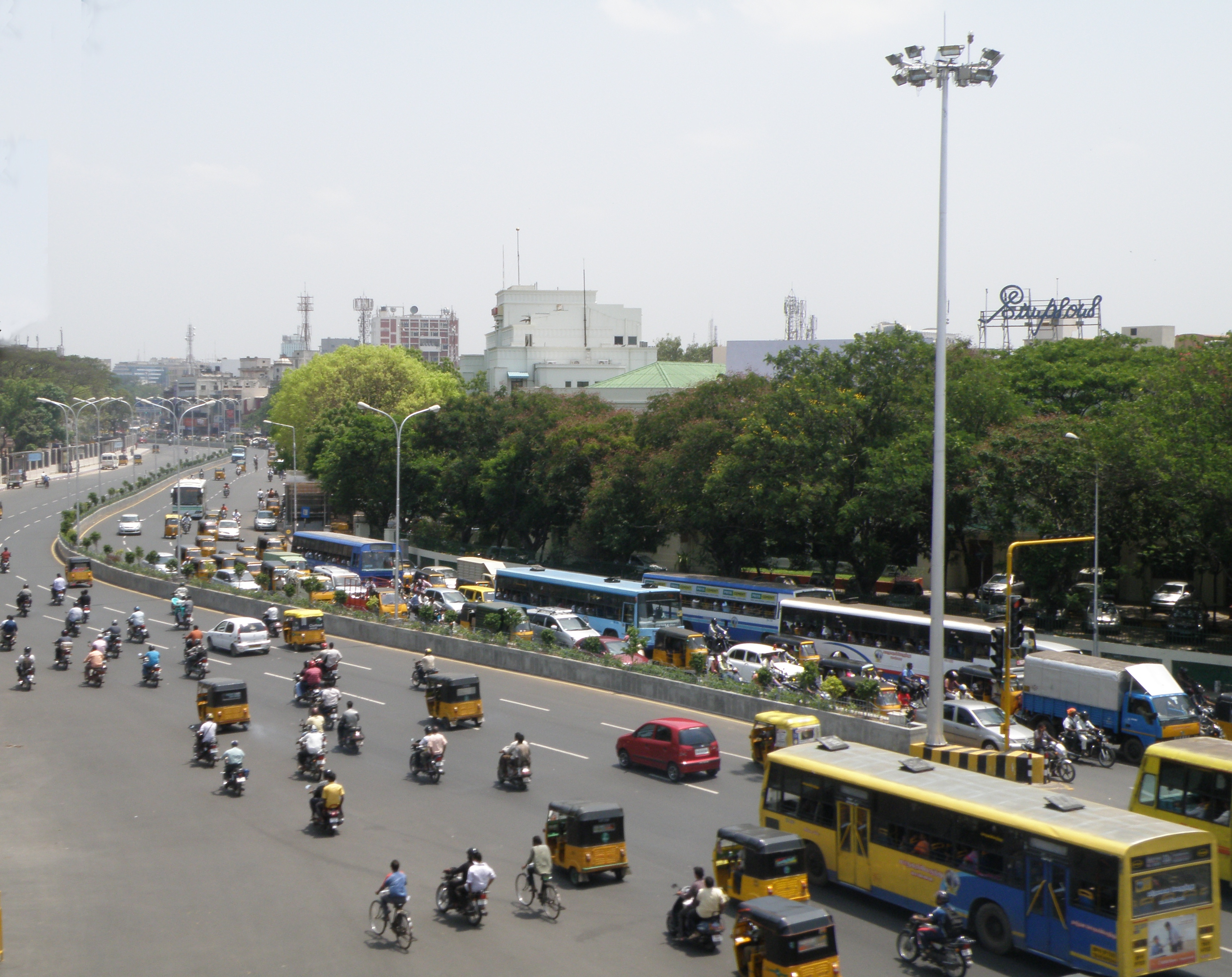
Anna Salai

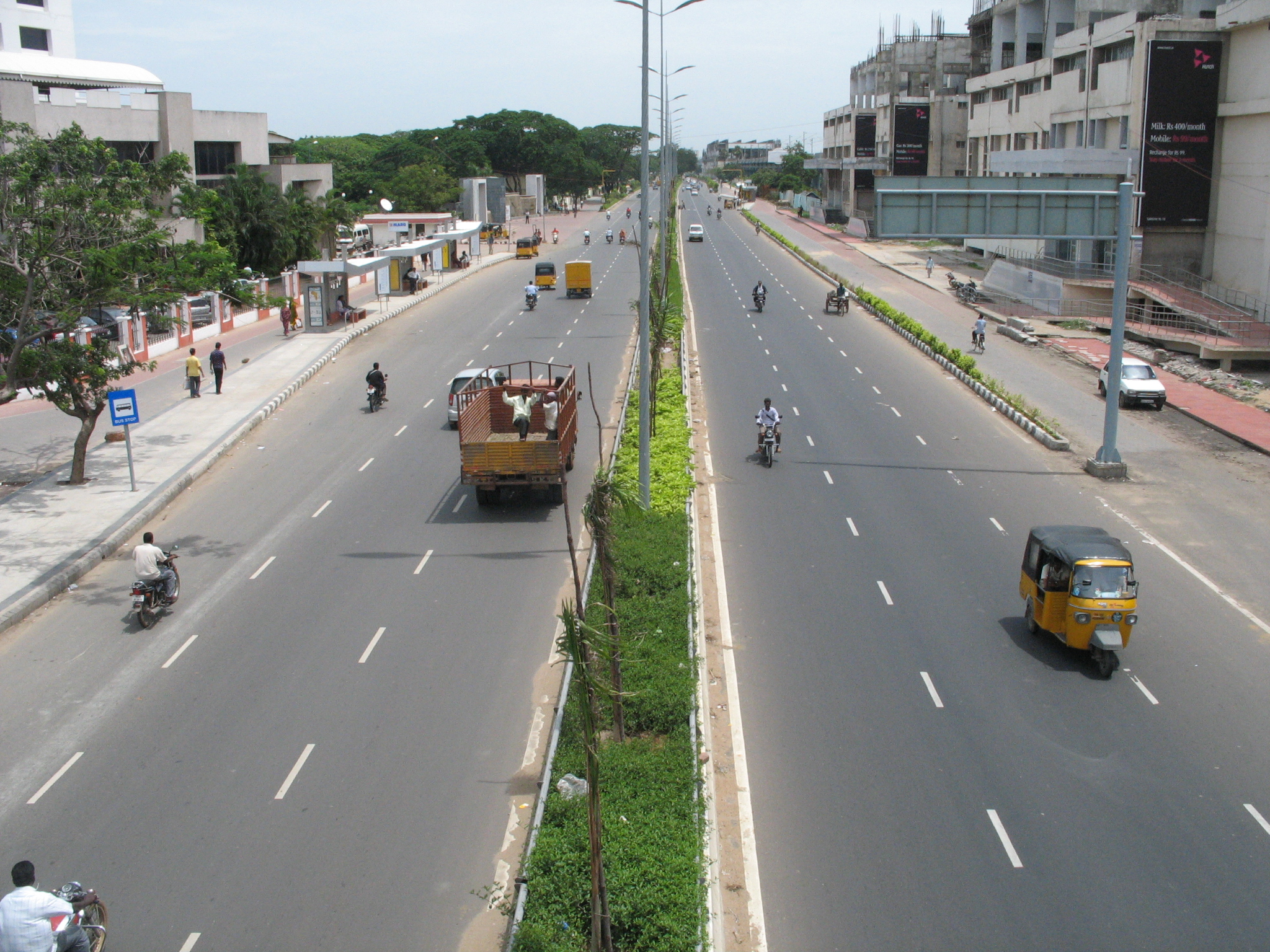
IT Corridor in Chennai

The city and metropolitan area are served by major arterial roads that run either in an east–west or north–south direction. Anna Salai – or Mount Road as it is more popularly called – is the city's most famous road. It traverses most of central and south Chennai and leads on to the Grand Southern Trunk Road (National Highway 45) to Tiruchirapalli. The road runs in a northeast–southwest direction. Other arterials include Kamaraj Salai, Poonamalee High Road (National Highway 48), Radhakrishnan Salai, and Sardar Patel Road. The East Coast Road starts from Thiruvanmiyur and connects Mahabalipuram, Pondicherry and extends beyond.

=== Buses ===
The first motor bus service in the city was organised by the Madras Tramway Corporation between 1925 and 1928. Most motor bus service providers in the city were nationalised as per the 1939 Motor Vehicles Act. The Pallavan Transport Corporation was created on 1 January 1972 to serve Madras city. It had a fleet of 1030 buses. In 1994, Pallavan Transport Corporation was bifurcated into Dr. Ambedkar Transport Corporation Limited for northern Madras and Pallavan Transport Corporation Limited for southern Madras. The two were reunited in 2001 to form the Metropolitan Transport Corporation. The bus service, currently, plies about 4,000 buses on 622 routes, moves an estimated 5.038 million passengers each day.

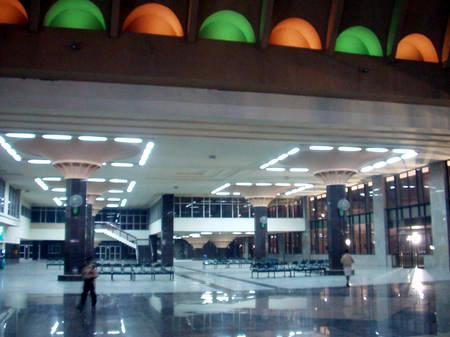
Puratchi Thalaivar Dr. M.G.R Bus Terminus in Koyambedu is the terminus for all intercity bus services from Chennai. It is one of the largest bus stations in Asia

The Puratchi Thalaivar Dr. M.G.R Bus Terminus, opened in 2001, is one of the largest bus station in Asia, and serves as the terminus for all intercity buses from Chennai. The CMBT is located on the Inner Ring Road at Koyambedu in the western part of Chennai, replacing the older terminus on the Esplanade in the city centre. State transport and private bus services to all major cities and towns in Tamil Nadu and neighbouring states start from here.

=== Other road vehicles ===
In addition to the bus service, private metered call taxis and fixed-rate tourist taxis are available at all entry points to the city like airport, mofussil bus terminus and central railway station. Unmetered autos ply across the city charging flat rates. Economical alternative to the auto rickshaws are the share autos, in which passengers pay a shared fee to their destination. In 2012, according to estimates, 66,679 auto rickshaws and over 2,000 share autos were running in the city. Of these, about 10,000 are operated using diesel. About 41,700 auto rickshaws run on LPG. Vans which are run like bus services and popularly called "Maxi Cabs" also ply on many routes in the city. The outlying suburban areas of the city are also served by private mini bus company services as well as government bus transport corporations of neighbouring districts.

Despite a sharp increase in the number of four-wheelers in the city, motorscooters are still very prevalent and are preferred to cars due to their affordability, fuel efficiency, manoeuvrability, and ease of parking.

In February 2014, bicycle-sharing system was conceived by the corporation to encourage bicycle transportation. Around 3,000 cycles was planned to be stationed at 200 places, which can be accessed with smart card system. The neighbourhoods of Thousand Lights, Egmore, Mylapore, Royapettah, Kamarajar Salai, government offices and Fort complex will be covered by the network in the first phase.

There are 31 auto LPG dispensing stations (ALDS) in the city, of which 11 are owned by Indian Oil Corporation Limited (IOCL). They have a capacity to supply 604,000 litres a day but an average of only 150,000 is sold daily. The demand is around 600,000 litres a day.

The city has a total of 372 junctions.

== Rail ==
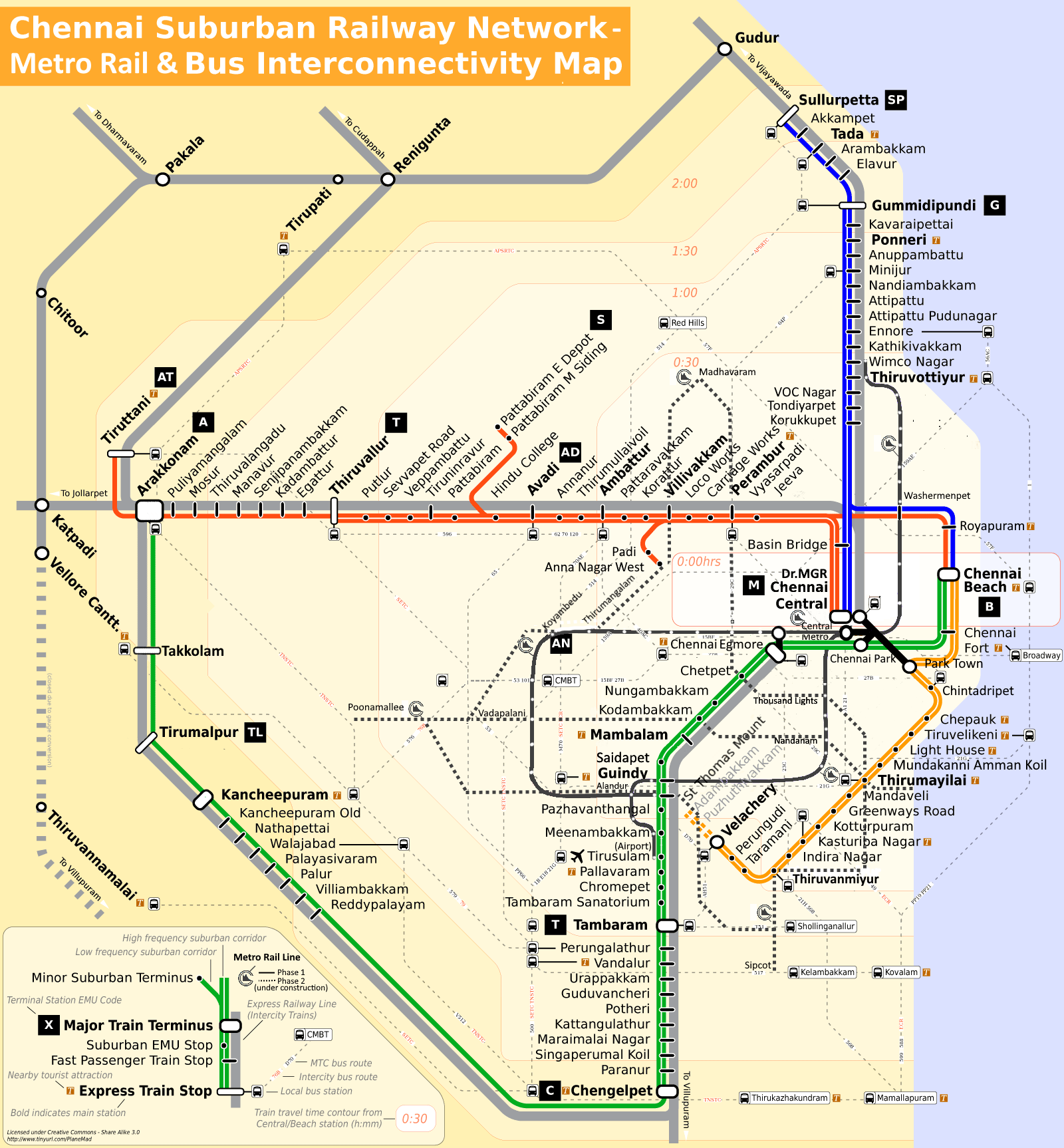
A map of the Chennai suburban train system and interconnecting bus routes

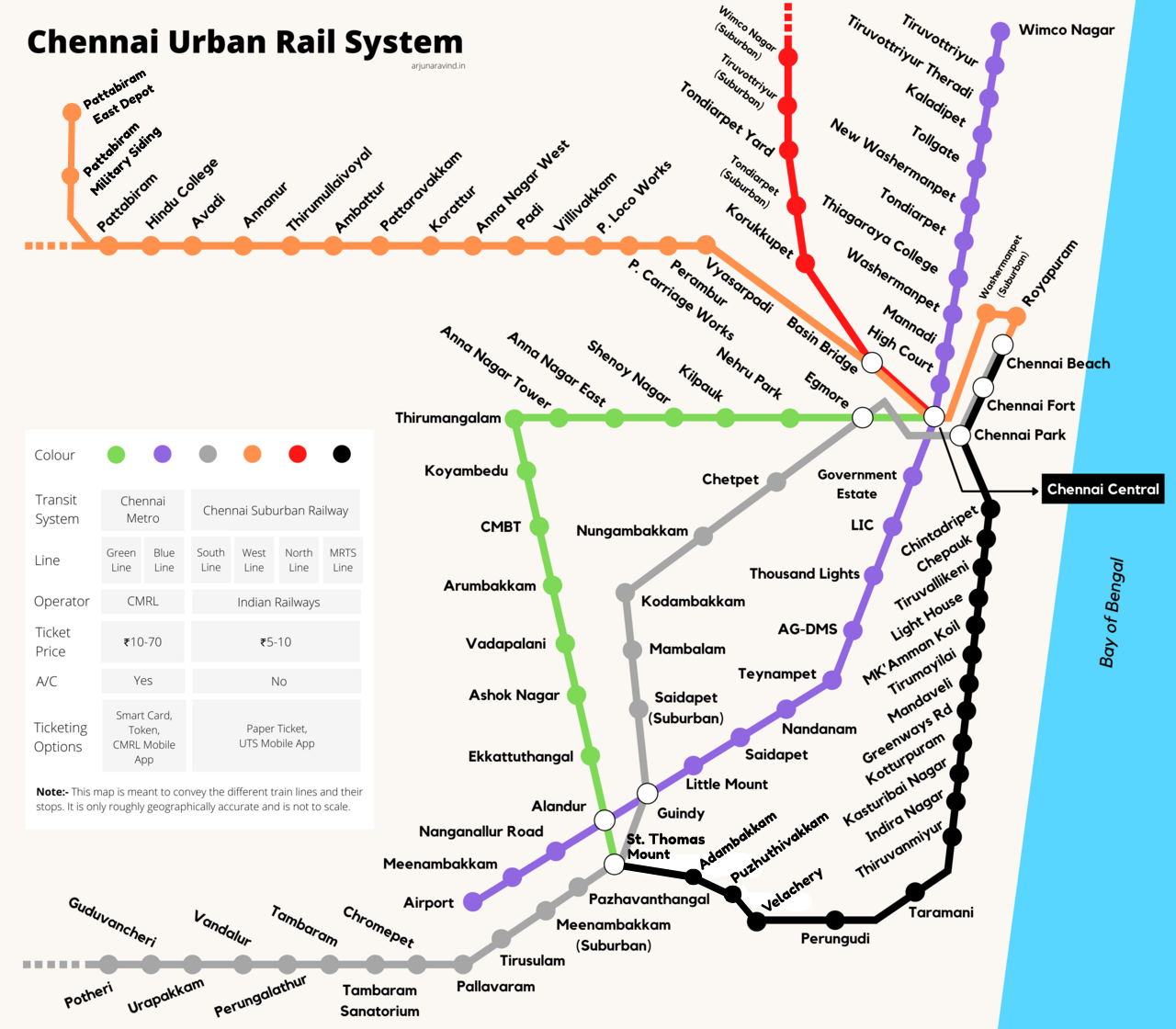
A graphical representation of the different public transit railway lines inside city limits in Chennai (including the Chennai Suburban Railway and the Chennai Metro) and their connections.

The first railway station in Madras city was opened at Royapuram in 1853. The first to be constructed in South India, the Royapuram station served as the headquarters of the Madras Railway Company. On 1 July 1856, the first railway service in South India was commenced between Madras and Arcot. Puratchi Thalaivar Dr. M.G. Ramachandran Central Railway Station was opened in 1873 followed by the Egmore Railway Station in 1908. Egmore served as the headquarters of the Madras and Southern Mahratta Railway from 1908 to 1951 while M.G.R Chennai Central served as the headquarters of the South Indian Railway Company from 1927 to 1951. Both the companies were liquidated when India's railway network was nationalised in the 1950s. M.G.R Chennai Central is currently the headquarters of the Southern Railway Zone of the Indian Railways.

Chennai's first suburban electric train service was inaugurated between Chennai Beach and Tambaram on 2 April 1931. The Chennai suburban railway system currently has 6 lines with a total system length of about 1,211.81 km (753 mi) (non-redundant track length) of which 509.71 km (317 mi) are true suburban and 702.1 km (436 mi) MEMU service].

- North Line: M.G.R Chennai Central MMC – Ennore – Gummidipoondi – Sullurpeta (— Gudur – Nellore – Bitragunta)
- South Line: Chennai Beach – Tambaram – Chengalpattu (— Melmaruvathur – Tindivanam – Villupuram – Puducherry (union territory))
- South West Line: Chennai Beach – Tambaram – Chengalpattu (— Kanchipuram – Tirumalpur – Arakkonam)
- West Line: Chennai Central MMC – Ambattur – Avadi – Tiruvallur – Arakkonam (— Katpadi – Jolarpet)
- North West Line: M.G.R Chennai Central MMC – Ambattur – Avadi – Tiruvallur – Arakkonam – Tiruttani (— Renigunta – Tirupati)
- South West Frontier Line: Chennai Beach – Royapuram – Washermanpet – Perambur – Ambattur – Arakkonam (— Katpadi – Vellore)

The system uses broad gauge. The section from Washermanpet to Beach handles predominantly freight traffic from Chennai Port, and is not geared well to serve passengers.

=== MRTS System ===
The MRTS system opened in the early 1990s and consists of the following active sections:

- Chennai Beach – Velachery - St. Thomas Mount

The last operational extension happened in March 2026 where MRTS system is extended to meet with the Tambaram branch of the existing suburban network at St. Thomas Mount. This plan envisages the MRTS line to proceed north from St. Thomas Mount via Velachery, forming a ring around the city and ending at the northbound M.G.R Central-Gummidipoondi line. However, extending MRTS beyond St. Thomas Mount is not very certain in light of the State Government deciding to develop the Chennai Metro rail system.

The map of entire rail network consisting of Chennai MRTS, Chennai Suburban and Chennai Metro.

=== Metro Railway ===
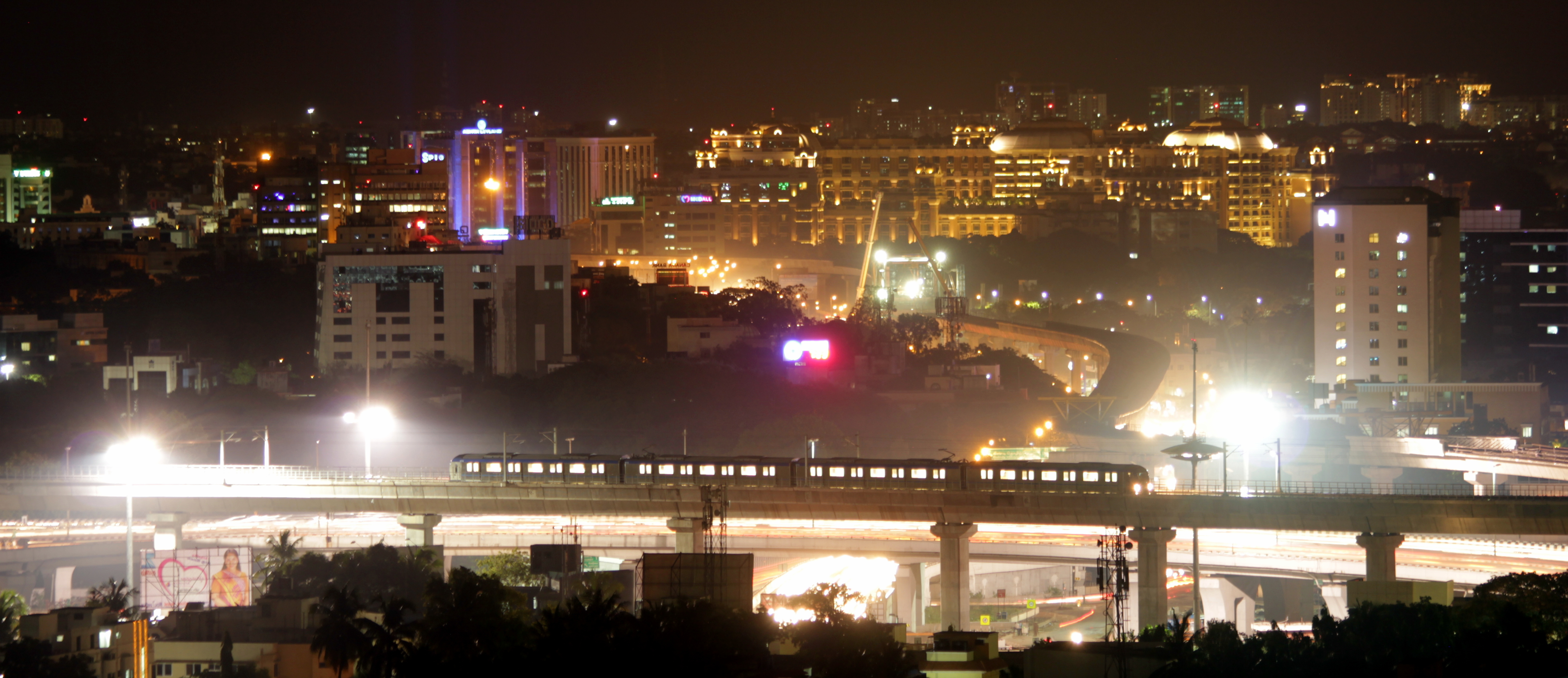
A view of the Chennai Metro at night.

Metro system of Chennai is currently operational with 2 corridors, and 3 more corridors under construction to meet the future urban transport requirements. First metro service for city was inaugurated from Koyambedu - Alandur on 29 June 2015. As a part of Phase-1 extension, Corridor 1 was extended till Wimco Nagar. In second phase, 3 corridors are under construction with plans to extend Corridor 1 from Airport to Kilambakkam and Corridor 5 from Koyambedu to Pattabiram.

- Blue Line (Corridor 1): Wimco Nagar – Chennai International Airport
- Green Line (Corridor 2): M.G.R Chennai Central – St. Thomas Mount
- Purple Line (Corridor 3): Madhavaram – SIPCOT Siruseri II
- Yellow Line (Corridor 4): Poonamallee - Lighthouse
- Red Line (Corridor 5): Madhavaram – Sholinganallur

==== Smart Card ====
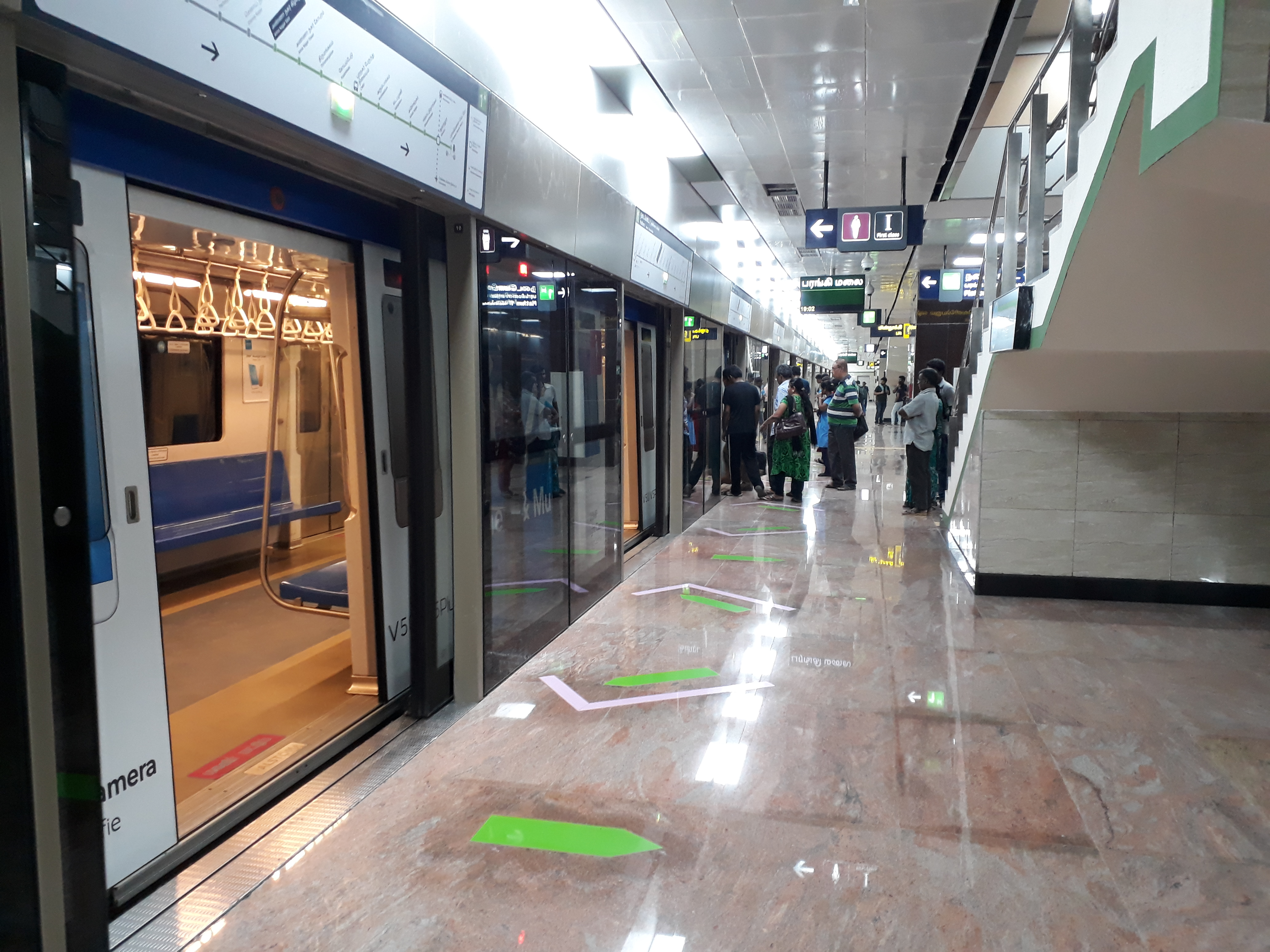
Chennai Underground metro station with India's first Platform Screen Doors

The Smart Card looks similar to a debit card, issued by CMRL at ticket counters for Rs. 100 currently. This Rs. 100 includes Rs. 50 refundable deposit, and Rs. 50 travel value. The travel value can be used to purchase platform and travel tickets for the Chennai metro trains. The smart card is valid for 6 months from the date of purchase and the extra amounts of travel value can be recharged whenever needed. It is found that very few people are using this smart card and many ticket vending machines which work on Smart cards do not function properly.

== Airport ==
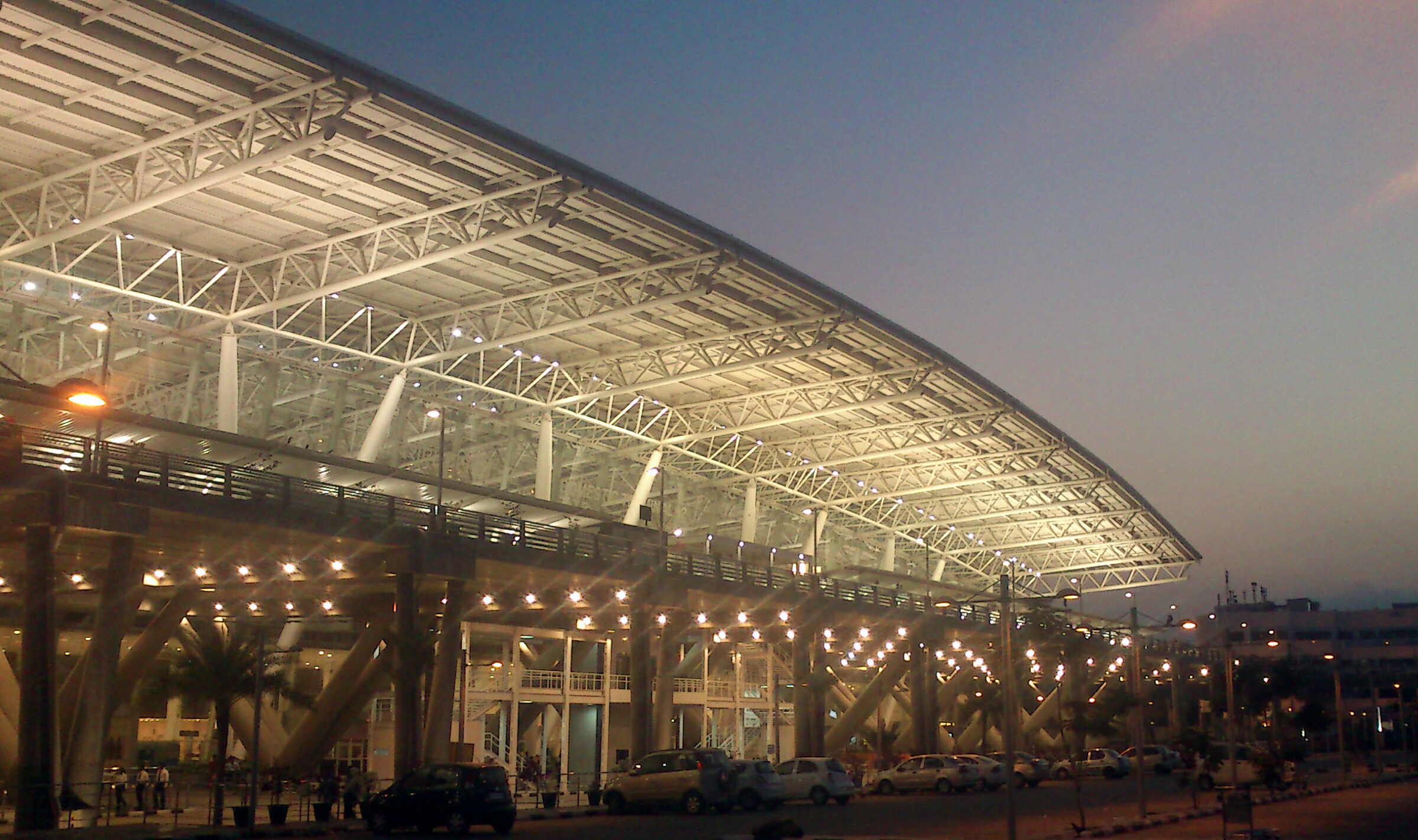
Front view of a part of Chennai Airport.

The Chennai International Airport serves as the city's airport for both domestic and international flights. The airport consists of the Anna International terminal and the Kamaraj Domestic terminal, and handles domestic as well as international flights. It is the sixth busiest airport in India, it handled a staggering 12 million passengers in 2007–08 with international passenger traffic alone growing at 20 percent – higher than any other metro airport in the country . The city is connected to major hubs in South Asia, Southeast Asia, the Middle East, and Europe through over fifteen international carriers. The airport is also the fourth busiest cargo terminus in the country with its large integrated cargo terminal. The Airport lies around 25 km from the city centre and is accessible by road and rail transport services.

This airport is undergoing modernisation and expansion, including the construction of an additional terminal. Furthermore, a new greenfield airport is to be constructed at an estimated cost of Rs 20 billion in Parandur (Near Sriperumbudur) to serve the city's burgeoning air traffic.

Other airports in the metropolitan area include the Indian Air Force base at Tambaram and the Indian Naval air base at Arakkonam.

== Ports ==
The city is served by two major ports namely Chennai Port – which is one of the largest artificial ports – and Ennore Port. Chennai port is India's second busiest container hub, handling general industrial cargo, automobiles, etc. An additional container terminal is being constructed, as well. Chennai Port has 21 alongside berths in three distinct zones of the Chennai port namely the Ambedkar Dock (inner harbor to handle passenger, general cargo and containers), Jawahar Dock (to handle coal, fertiliser, other bulk and break bulk cargo) and Bharathi Dock (outer harbor accommodates ore and oil handling system and a modern container terminal). The Ennore port currently handles cargo such as coal, ore and bulk and break bulk cargo. A new container terminal is also planned for the Ennore port. A smaller harbour at Royapuram is used by local fishing boats and trawlers.

== Developments ==
From September 2012, the city traffic police has planned to shift to a ₹ 1,170-million integrated traffic management system (ITMS), which is a first of its kind in the country, through which 100 arterial traffic junctions in the city will be integrated and brought under CCTV surveillance with facilities to ensure smooth traffic flow and streamline the traffic violations as well. The system comprises traffic junction surveillance system and automatic number plate reading system (ANPRS) through which vehicle numbers of traffic offenders would be identified and challans sent to them with visuals of the offence. ITMS would also provide a seamless passageway to the ambulances and VVIP vehicles by giving green signals at the three consecutive junctions ahead and help nabbing the criminals by signalling red lights. A total of 700 cameras (ANPRS and pan-tilt-zoom) would be installed at 100 junctions.

As part of the ITMS, a green corridor for emergency services, including ambulances and fire tenders, will also be implemented.

== Growth in vehicle population ==
Chennai's vehicle population has been accelerating steadily from 600,000 in 1992, to 1.3 million in 2001 and 3.64 million in 2012. Daily, about 1,500 new vehicles hit the roads, with two-wheelers constituting more than 75 percent of them. However, registration of new cars is also on the rise. Chennai vehicles constitute one-fourth of the 17.5 million vehicles across the state of Tamil Nadu. The state has more two-wheelers (13 million) than Maharashtra, which has more vehicles overall. Two-wheelers account for 78 percent of all vehicles in the state, while cars add up to 14 percent. According to a survey conducted by the city traffic police in 2012, there is a vehicle on the road for every two Chennaiites. Given the growth rate, it is predicted that Chennai will soon have twice as many vehicles as Mumbai.

Owing to the high traffic density, the average bus speed in the city as of 2014 is 17-18 kilometres per hour. Over the next five years it is expected to come down to 12 km per hour, whereas the maximum allowable operating speed of the vehicles shall be 80 km/h with a maximum design speed of 90 km/h. The Chennai Metro Rail project is expected to reduce the commuting time by 75 percent from one end of the city to another.

== Pollution ==
Chennai ranks fifth in carbon emissions from the transport sector among 54 South Asian cities, according to a study done by the International Council for Local Environmental Initiative (ICLEI). The city's emission levels in transport is much higher than Kolkata and Delhi. According to the study, Chennai has a per capita emission rate of 0.91 tonnes of carbon dioxide, while its total emissions for the year is 3.82 metric tonnes. This is mostly due to the significant increase of motor vehicles used for commuting and carrying goods in the past few years. As against 1.25 million registered vehicles in the city in 2001, there are approximately 3.5 million registered vehicles in 2012.

== Safety ==
According to statistics in the report Accidental Death and Suicides in India (ADSI) 2011, prepared by the National Crime Records Bureau, Chennai has recorded the highest number of road accidents in India, with a staggering 9,845 cases in the year 2011, the highest among 53 cities in the country. This is almost twice as that of 2010, when 5,123 road accidents were recorded. This is much higher than the Delhi's 6,065 road accidents, the city ranking second. However, only 1,399 people died in road mishaps in Chennai, while Delhi recorded 1,679 fatalities. Accidents on the Chennai's roads resulted in 7,898 persons getting injured, including 6,280 males and 1,618 females. Of these, two-wheelers involved in as many as 341 cases of accidents, followed by private lorries at 266, cars at 159, private tempos and vans at 133, government vehicles at 112, bicycle at 1, with no pedestrian accidents. The largest number of accidents occurred between 9 p.m. and midnight with 1,626 cases, while the period between 3 p.m. and 6 p.m. comes close at 1,614 cases. Accidents were also highest in the seven-month period between March and September. Of all the fatal accident in the city between 2007 and 2012, the percentage of hit-and-run cases have been 15 to 18 percent.

== The future ==
In August 2018, the 162-km-long Chennai Peripheral Road (CPR) connecting Kattupalli in Tiruvallur district (in the northern periphery of the city) with the Pooncheri near Mamallapuram (in the southern periphery of the city), connecting industrial hubs of Tatchur, Sriperumbudur, Oragadam, and Singaperumal Koil, was accorded environmental clearance. Estimated to cost ₹ 125,000 million, the project envisions a 100-metre-wide six-lane road with two service lanes on either side, with space for a utilities corridor to carry oil and gas pipelines. This includes strengthening and widening of 78.6 km of existing roads. The project will be completed in 6 years.

== See also ==
- Railway stations in Chennai
- Transport in India
