= Alwarthirunagar metro station =

Upcoming Chennai Metro's Yellow Line and Red Line interchange metro station

Alwarthirunagar

General information
- Coordinates: 13.04628°N 80.18869°E,
- System: Chennai Metro station
- Owner: Chennai Metro Rail Limited (CMRL)
- Operator: Chennai Metro
- Line: Yellow Line Red Line
- Platforms: Side platform Platform-1 → Poonamallee Bypass; Platform-2 → Vadapalani * * (Further extension to Lighthouse in the future); Platform-3 → Koyambedu ** ** (Further extension to Madhavaram Milk Colony in the future); Platform-4 → Arignar Anna Alandur *** *** (Further extension to Sholinganallur in the future)
- Tracks: 2 (Yellow Line) + 2 (Red Line)

Construction
- Structure type: Double-Elevated, Double track
- Platform levels: 4 (TBC)
- Accessible: Yes

Other information
- Status: Under Construction; Under Construction

History
- Opening: March 2027; 3 months' time (TBC); March 2027; 3 months' time (TBC)
- Electrified: Single phase 25 kV, 35 Hz AC through overhead catenary

Services
Preceding station	Chennai Metro	Following station
Valasaravakkam towards Poonamallee Bypass	Yellow Line (Operational around March 2027)	Virugambakkam South towards Vadapalani
Valasaravakkam towards Poonamallee Bypass	Yellow Line (Lighthouse - Around June 2028)	Virugambakkam South towards Lighthouse
Valasaravakkam towards Parandur Airport	Yellow Line (Extension in the future)	Virugambakkam South towards Lighthouse
Valasaravakkam towards Alandur	Red Line (Operational around March 2027)	Virugambakkam towards Koyambedu
Valasaravakkam towards Sholinganallur	Red Line (Sholinganallur - Around Dec 2027)	Virugambakkam towards Koyambedu
Valasaravakkam towards Sholinganallur	Red Line (Madhavaram - Around Dec 2028)	Virugambakkam towards Madhavaram Milk Colony
Valasaravakkam towards Pattabiram	Red Line (Extension in the future)	Virugambakkam towards Madhavaram Milk Colony
Route map
Location

Alwarthirunagar metro station is an upcoming double-decker elevated interchange metro station on the East-West Corridor of the Yellow Line and upcoming North-South Corridor of the Red Line of Chennai Metro in Chennai, India. This metro station will be among the 30 elevated stations of Corridor IV, 12 underground stations along Corridor IV of the Chennai Metro, Poonamallee Bypass–Lighthouse stretch and among the 4 double-decker elevated stations in Phase II of Chennai Metro.

== Yellow Line ==
Under this line, this metro station is estimated to be operational around March 2027 under Phase II of Chennai Metro Rail Limited.

== Red Line ==
Under this line, this metro station is proposed to become operational around March 2027 under Phase II of Chennai Metro Rail Limited.

== History ==
As part of Chennai Metro Phase II, Alwar Thirunagar station was planned to serve both Corridor 4 (Lighthouse to Poonamallee Bypass) and Corridor 5 (Madhavaram Milk Colony to Sholinganallur). It is one of four stations on the shared double-decker section, along with Alapakkam, Karambakkam and Valasaravakkam. The design places the two corridors at different levels within the same elevated structure, with a common concourse serving both lines.

The station is included in the environmental assessment for Corridor 4. CMRL's press release dated 17 November 2022 also outlined the planned double-decker infrastructure and the arrangement of the four shared stations.

== Station layout ==
Station Layout

G	Street level	Exit/Entrance
L1	Mezzanine	Fare control, station agent, Metro Card vending machines, crossover
L2	Platform 2 Eastbound	Towards → Vadapalani * Next Station: Virugambakkam South
L2	Island platform | Doors will open on the right
L2	Platform 1 Westbound	Towards ← Poonamallee Bypass ** Next Station: Valasaravakkam; Change at the next station for Red Line
L2	Note:	Further extension to * Lighthouse and ** Parandur Airport in the future
L3	Platform # Eastbound	Towards → Koyambedu * Next Station: Virugambakkam
L3	Island platform | Doors will open on the right
L3	Platform # Westbound	Towards ← Alandur ** Next Station: Valasaravakkam; Change at the next station for Yellow Line
L3	Note:	Further extension to * Madhavaram Milk Colony and ** Sholinganallur in the future

== See also ==
- List of Chennai metro stations
- Railway stations in Chennai
- Transport in Chennai
- Urban rail transit in India
- List of metro systems
