= Valasaravakkam metro station =

Upcoming Chennai Metro's Yellow Line and Red Line interchange metro station

Valasaravakkam

General information
- Coordinates: 13.04221°N 80.18038°E
- System: Chennai Metro station
- Owner: Chennai Metro Rail Limited (CMRL)
- Operator: Chennai Metro
- Line: Yellow Line Red Line
- Platforms: Side platform Platform-1 → Poonamallee Bypass; Platform-2 → Vadapalani * * (Further extension to Lighthouse in the future); Platform-3 → Koyambedu ** ** (Further extension to Madhavaram Milk Colony in the future); Platform-4 → Arignar Anna Alandur *** *** (Further extension to Sholinganallur in the future)
- Tracks: 2 (Yellow Line) + 2 (Red Line)

Construction
- Structure type: Double-Elevated, Double track
- Platform levels: 4 (TBC)
- Accessible: Yes

Other information
- Status: Under Construction; Under Construction

History
- Opening: March 2027; 3 months' time (TBC); March 2027; 3 months' time (TBC)
- Electrified: Single phase 25 kV, 35 Hz AC through overhead catenary

Services
Preceding station	Chennai Metro	Following station
Karambakkam towards Poonamallee Bypass	Yellow Line (Operational around March 2027)	Alwar Thirunagar towards Vadapalani
Karambakkam towards Poonamallee Bypass	Yellow Line (Lighthouse - Around June 2028)	Alwar Thirunagar towards Lighthouse
Karambakkam towards Parandur Airport	Yellow Line (Extension in the future)	Alwar Thirunagar towards Lighthouse
Karambakkam towards Alandur	Red Line (Operational around March 2027)	Alwar Thirunagar towards Koyambedu
Karambakkam towards Sholinganallur	Red Line (Sholinganallur - Around Dec 2027)	Alwar Thirunagar towards Koyambedu
Karambakkam towards Sholinganallur	Red Line (Madhavaram - Around Dec 2028)	Alwar Thirunagar towards Madhavaram Milk Colony
Karambakkam towards Pattabiram	Red Line (Extension in the future)	Alwar Thirunagar towards Madhavaram Milk Colony
Route map
Location

Valasaravakkam metro station is an upcoming double-elevated metro station on the East-West Corridor of the Yellow Line and upcoming North-South Corridor of the Red Line of Chennai Metro in Chennai, India. This metro station will be among the 30 elevated stations of Corridor IV, 12 underground stations along Corridor IV of the Chennai Metro, Poonamallee Bypass–Lighthouse stretch and among the 4 double-elevated stations in the whole of Phase II of Chennai Metro.

== Yellow Line ==
Under this line, this metro station is estimated to be operational around March 2027 under Phase II of Chennai Metro Rail Limited.

== Red Line ==
Under this line, this metro station is proposed to become operational around March 2027 under Phase II of Chennai Metro Rail Limited.

== History ==
The planned metro connection through Valasaravakkam is part of Corridor 4 (Poonamallee Bypass to Lighthouse) of Chennai Metro Phase II and is also incorporated into Corridor 5 (Madhavaram Milk Colony to Sholinganallur). The station belongs to the double-decker section shared by the two corridors, with platforms at different levels connected through a common concourse. This design allows both lines to use the same elevated structure through the area.

Valasaravakkam is included in CMRL's environmental assessment for Corridor 4. The organisation's November 2022 press release also described the double-decker design planned for this section and identified the four stations served by the shared structure.

== Station layout ==
Station Layout

G	Street level	Exit/Entrance
L1	Mezzanine	Fare control, station agent, Metro Card vending machines, crossover
L2	Platform 2 Eastbound	Towards → Vadapalani * Next Station: Alwar Thirunagar
L2	Island platform | Doors will open on the right For Platforms 1 and 2, change at the next station for Red Line
L2	Platform 1 Westbound	Towards ← Poonamallee Bypass ** Next Station: Karambakkam
L2	Note:	Further extension to * Lighthouse and ** Parandur Airport in the future
L3	Platform # Eastbound	Towards → Koyambedu * Next Station: Alwar Thirunagar
L3	Island platform | Doors will open on the right For Platforms #, change at the next station for Yellow Line
L3	Platform # Westbound	Towards ← Alandur ** Next Station: Karambakkam
L3	Note:	Further extension to * Madhavaram Milk Colony and ** Sholinganallur in the future

== See also ==
- List of Chennai metro stations
- Railway stations in Chennai
- Transport in Chennai
- Urban rail transit in India
- List of metro systems
