= Karambakkam metro station =

Upcoming Chennai Metro's Yellow Line and Red Line interchange metro station

Karambakkam

General information
- Coordinates: 13.03956°N 80.17023°E
- System: Chennai Metro station
- Owner: Chennai Metro Rail Limited (CMRL)
- Operator: Chennai Metro
- Line: Yellow Line Red Line
- Platforms: Side platform Platform-1 → Poonamallee Bypass; Platform-2 → Vadapalani * * (Further extension to Lighthouse in the future); Platform-3 → Koyambedu ** ** (Further extension to Madhavaram Milk Colony in the future); Platform-4 → Arignar Anna Alandur *** *** (Further extension to Sholinganallur in the future)
- Tracks: 2 (Yellow Line) + 2 (Red Line)

Construction
- Structure type: Double-Elevated, Double track
- Platform levels: 4 (TBC)
- Accessible: Yes

Other information
- Status: Under Construction; Under Construction

History
- Opening: March 2027; 3 months' time (TBC); March 2027; 3 months' time (TBC)
- Electrified: Single phase 25 kV, 35 Hz AC through overhead catenary

Services
Preceding station	Chennai Metro	Following station
Alapakkam towards Poonamallee Bypass	Yellow Line (Operational around March 2027)	Valasaravakkam towards Vadapalani
Alapakkam towards Poonamallee Bypass	Yellow Line (Lighthouse - Around June 2028)	Valasaravakkam towards Lighthouse
Alapakkam towards Parandur Airport	Yellow Line (Extension in the future)	Valasaravakkam towards Lighthouse
Alapakkam towards Alandur	Red Line (Operational around March 2027)	Valasaravakkam towards Koyambedu
Alapakkam towards Sholinganallur	Red Line (Sholinganallur - Around Dec 2027)	Valasaravakkam towards Koyambedu
Alapakkam towards Sholinganallur	Red Line (Madhavaram - Around Dec 2028)	Valasaravakkam towards Madhavaram Milk Colony
Alapakkam towards Pattabiram	Red Line (Extension in the future)	Valasaravakkam towards Madhavaram Milk Colony
Route map
Location

Karambakkam metro station is an upcoming double-elevated metro station on the East-West Corridor of the Yellow Line and upcoming North-South Corridor of the Red Line of Chennai Metro in Chennai, India. This metro station will be among the 30 elevated stations of Corridor IV, 12 underground stations along Corridor IV of the Chennai Metro, Poonamallee Bypass–Lighthouse stretch and among the 4 double-elevated stations in the whole of Phase II of Chennai Metro.

== Yellow Line ==
Under this line, this metro station is estimated to be operational around March 2027 under Phase II of Chennai Metro Rail Limited.

== Red Line ==
Under this line, this metro station is proposed to become operational around March 2027 under Phase II of Chennai Metro Rail Limited.

== History ==
Plans for Karambakkam metro station form part of the Chennai Metro Phase II expansion, under which Corridor 4 (Poonamallee Bypass to Lighthouse) and Corridor 5 (Madhavaram Milk Colony to Sholinganallur) share an elevated section. Karambakkam is one of four stations on this double-decker section, designed with separate platforms at different levels and a common concourse for passenger access. CMRL's project information also identifies a track crossover at the station.

This metro station is listed in the environmental assessment for Corridor 4. Its double-decker arrangement was also described in CMRL's press release of 17 November 2022, which outlined the planned infrastructure for the shared section.

== Station layout ==
Station Layout

G	Street level	Exit/Entrance
L1	Mezzanine	Fare control, station agent, Metro Card vending machines, crossover
L2	Platform 2 Eastbound	Towards → Vadapalani * Next Station: Valasaravakkam
L2	Island platform | Doors will open on the right For Platforms 1 and 2, change at the next station for Red Line
L2	Platform 1 Westbound	Towards ← Poonamallee Bypass ** Next Station: Alapakkam
L2	Note:	Further extension to * Lighthouse and ** Parandur Airport in the future
L3	Platform # Eastbound	Towards → Koyambedu * Next Station: Valasaravakkam
L3	Island platform | Doors will open on the right For Platforms #, change at the next station for Yellow Line
L3	Platform # Westbound	Towards ← Alandur ** Next Station: Alapakkam
L3	Note:	Further extension to * Madhavaram Milk Colony and ** Sholinganallur in the future

== See also ==
- List of Chennai metro stations
- Railway stations in Chennai
- Transport in Chennai
- Urban rail transit in India
- List of metro systems
