= Madhavaram Depot metro station =

Metro station in Chennai, India

Madhavaram Depot

General information
- Location: Madhavaram, Chennai, Tamil Nadu 600060; India
- Coordinates: 13.1568°N 80.2374°E
- System: Chennai Metro station
- Owner: Chennai Metro
- Operator: Chennai Metro Rail Limited
- Line: Red Line
- Platforms: Island platforms Platform-1 → Sholinganallur metro station Platform-2 → Madhavaram Milk Colony metro station
- Tracks: 2

Construction
- Structure type: At-grade, Double track
- Parking: No
- Accessible: Yes

History
- Opened: Under construction
- Electrified: Single phase 25 kV, 50 Hz AC through overhead catenary

Services
Preceding station	Chennai Metro	Following station
Madhavaram Milk Colony towards Madhavaram Milk Colony or Pattabiram	Red Line (Under Construction)	Assisi Nagar towards Sholinganallur
Route map
Location

Madhavaram Depot metro station is a metro railway station on the Red Line of the Chennai Metro. The station is the only at-grade station of the Chennai Metro, and one of the 48 stations of the Madhavaram Milk Colony–Sholinganallur stretch. The station serves the neighbourhoods of Madhavaram.

== History ==
Construction of the station began in 2021. The Madhavaram Depot station is said to be the shallowest metro station with only at-grade entry/exit, ticketing, concourse level and platforms at level 1 of underground.

== Station layout ==
Station Layout

G	Street level, Mezzanine	Entrance/Exit, Fare control, station agent, Ticket/token, shops
L1	Platform # Northwest bound	Towards → Sholinganallur; Next Station: Assisi Nagar
L1	Island platform | Doors will open on the right
L1	Platform # Southbound	Towards → Madhavaram Milk Colony; Next Station: Madhavaram Milk Colony

== Depot ==
The Madhavaram Depot metro station will feature a depot, which will be one of the six depots of the Chennai Metro. Madhavaram depot will service and operate Line 5 trains alongwith Pattabiram depot serving extension branch line of Koyambedu - Pattabiram.

== See also ==
- List of Chennai metro stations
- Railway stations in Chennai
- Transport in Chennai
- Urban rail transit in India
- List of metro systems
