= Red Line (Chennai Metro) =

Transit line in Chennai, India

Red Line (Line 5)

Overview
- Native name: சிவப்பு வழித்தடம்
- Status: Under Construction
- Locale: Chennai, Tamil Nadu, India
- Termini: Madhavaram Milk Colony; Sholinganallur
- Connecting lines: Operational (8): Blue Line Green Line Yellow Line Chennai MRTS , Chennai Suburban North Line , Chennai Suburban West Line , Chennai Suburban West North Line Chennai Suburban South Line; Under Construction (2): Red Line Purple Line
- Stations: 45 (Under Construction) (Note: Madhavaram Milk Colony and Sholinganallur stations would be shared with Purple Line. Alapakkam, Karambakkam, Valasaravakkam, Alwarthirunagar stations will be shared with Yellow Line) + 19 (Planned) = 64
- Website: chennaimetrorail.org

Service
- Type: Rapid transit
- System: Chennai Metro
- Operator: Delhi Metro Rail Corporation
- Depot(s): Madhavaram; Pattabiram
- Rolling stock: Alstom; BEML

Technical
- Line length: 47 km (29 mi)
- Num of tracks: 2
- Track gauge: 1,435 mm (4 ft 8 1/2 in) standard gauge
- Electrification: 25 kV 50 Hz AC overhead catenary
- Signalling: CBTC Signalling System

The Red Line or Line 5 is one of the under construction lines of Chennai Metro Phase-II stretching from Madhavaram Milk Colony to Sholinganallur. The 47 km (29 mi)-long line will consist of 45 stations, out of which six will be underground and 39 will be at grade or elevated. A branch line of corridor five, known as Line 5B, from Koyambedu to Pattabiram has been proposed with its Detailed Project Report approved by Government of Tamil Nadu in May 2025. The 21.76 km (13.52 mi) branch line will consist of 19 elevated stations.

== Planning and construction ==
=== Phase II ===
The construction of the first phase of Chennai Metro started in June 2009. Commercial operations started on the green line in June 2015. On 10 February 2019, the extension of blue line was opened, completing the first phase of the metro.

In July 2016, Government of Tamil Nadu announced that the second phase would have three lines totaling 104 km (65 mi) in length with 104 stations. Two corridors would extend from Madhavaram connecting with Siruseri and Sholinganallur respectively (lines 3 and 5) with the third corridor connecting Koyambedu with Lighthouse (line 4). The fifth line connecting Madhavaram Milk Colony and Sholinganallur will extend to 47 km (29 mi) of which 41.2 km (25.6 mi) would be elevated and 5.8 km (3.6 mi) underground. It will consist of 48 stations including six undergrounds stations. The stations for the second phase were designed to be smaller than the existing stations operational in the first phase.

On 20 November 2020, foundation stone for the second phase was laid and construction commenced. In November 2022, Alstom was awarded the contract to supply metro coaches for the phase II expansion. In May 2023, CMRL announced a revised plan for the second phase revising the station count on the fifth line to 45.8 As per the final plan, the line will extend for 47 km (29 mi).

Chennai Metro - Phase II
Line Name	Terminals		Length (km)	Stations	Status
Red Line	Madhavaram Milk Colony	Sholinganallur	47	45	Under construction

The second phase is estimated to cost ₹632.46 billion (US$6.8 billion) of which initially ₹47.1 billion (US$500 million) was loaned by Japan International Cooperation Agency. On 14 February 2021, the Prime Minister of India announced that the government has set aside ₹630 billion (US$6.7 billion) for the construction of phase II and further extension. The line is expected to be completed by 2028.

=== Phase II extension ===
In 2022, the state government proposed a branch extension for the fifth line from Koyambedu to Avadi, covering an approximate 16.1 km (10.0 mi). In early 2024, feasibility report was submitted by CMRL for the proposed expansion of the line, green lighting the same. It was later decided to extend the line till Pattabiram. The Detailed Project Report was approved by the Government of Tamil Nadu in May 2025 and forwarded to the Government of India for final approval. A depot near Pattabiram stretch of Outer Ring Road is also planned as a part of the expansion.

Chennai Metro - Phase II Extension - Line 5B
Line	Terminals		Length	Stations	Status
Red Line	Koyambedu	Pattabiram	21.76 km (13.52 mi)	19	DPR approved

== Stations ==
Red Line
S.No	Station Name		Expected Opening	Connections	Layout
S.No	English	Tamil	Expected Opening	Connections	Layout
1	Madhavaram Milk Colony	மாதவரம் பால் பண்ணை	December 2028	Purple Line (Under Construction)	Underground
2	Madhavaram Depot	மாதவரம் பணிமனை	December 2028		At-grade
3	Assisi Nagar	அசிசி நகர்	December 2028		Elevated
4	Manjambakkam	மஞ்சம்பாக்கம்	December 2028		Elevated
5	Velmurugan Nagar	வேல்முருகன் நகர்	December 2028		Elevated
6	Madhavaram Bus Terminus	மாதவரம் பேருந்து நிலையம்	December 2028	Madhavaram Mofussil Bus Terminus	Elevated
7	Shastri Nagar, Chennai	சாஸ்திரி நகர்	December 2028		Elevated
8	Retteri Junction	ரெட்டேரி சந்திப்பு	December 2028		Elevated
9	Kolathur Junction	கொளத்தூர் சந்திப்பு	December 2028		Underground
10	Srinivasa Nagar	சீனிவாச நகர்	December 2028		Underground
11	Villivakkam	வில்லிவாக்கம்	December 2028	Villivakkam (West Line)	Underground
12	Villivakkam Bus Terminus	வில்லிவாக்கம் பேருந்து நிலையம்	December 2028		Underground
13	Villivakkam CTH Road	வில்லிவாக்கம் சி.டி.எச் சாலை	December 2028		Underground
14	Anna Nagar West	அண்ணா நகர் மேற்கு	December 2028		Elevated
15	Thirumangalam	திருமங்கலம்	December 2028	Green Line	Elevated
16	Anna Nagar KV	அண்ணா நகர் கே.வி	December 2028		Elevated
17	Koyambedu	கோயம்பேடு	March 2027	Green Line	Elevated
18	Koyambedu Market	கோயம்பேடு அங்காடி	June 2027		Elevated
19	Natesan Nagar	நடேசன் நகர்	June 2027		Elevated
20	Virugambakkam	விருகம்பாக்கம்	June 2027		Elevated
21	Alwarthirunagar	ஆழ்வார்திருநகர்	June 2027	Yellow Line (Under Construction)	Elevated
22	Valasaravakkam	வளசரவாக்கம்	June 2027	Yellow Line (Under Construction)	Elevated
23	Karambakkam	காரம்பாக்கம்	June 2027	Yellow Line (Under Construction)	Elevated
24	Alapakkam	ஆலப்பாக்கம் சந்திப்பு	June 2027	Yellow Line (Under Construction)	Elevated
25	Mugalivakkam	முகலிவாக்கம்	June 2027		Elevated
26	Ramapuram	ராமாபுரம்	June 2027		Elevated
27	Manapakkam	மணப்பாக்கம்	June 2027		Elevated
28	Chennai Trade Centre	சென்னை வர்த்தக மையம்	June 2027		Elevated
29	Butt Road	பட் சாலை	June 2027		Elevated
30	Alandur	ஆலந்தூர்	June 2027	Blue Line; Green Line	Elevated
31	St. Thomas Mount	பரங்கிமலை	March 2028	Green Line; St. Thomas Mount (South Line); St. Thomas Mount (Chennai MRTS)	Elevated
32	Adambakkam	ஆதம்பாக்கம்	March 2028	Adambakkam (Chennai MRTS)^{[§]}	Elevated
33	Vanuvampet	வானுவம்பேட்டை	March 2028		Elevated
34	Ullagaram	உள்ளகரம்	March 2028		Elevated
35	Madipakkam	மடிப்பாக்கம்	March 2028		Elevated
36	Kilkattalai	கீழ்க்கட்டளை	March 2028		Elevated
37	Echangadu	ஈச்சங்காடு	March 2028		Elevated
38	Kovilambakkam	கோவிலம்பாக்கம்	March 2028		Elevated
39	Vellakkal	வெள்ளக்கல்	March 2028		Elevated
40	Medavakkam I	மேடவாக்கம் I	March 2028		Elevated
41	Medavakkam II	மேடவாக்கம் II	March 2028		Elevated
42	Perumbakkam	பெரும்பாக்கம்	March 2028		Elevated
43	Classical Tamil Institute	செம்மொழித் தமிழாய்வு நிறுவனம்	March 2028		Elevated
44	Elcot	எல்காட்	March 2028		Elevated
45	Sholinganallur	சோழிங்கநல்லூர்	March 2028	Purple Line (Under Construction)	Elevated
46	Padi Pudhu Nagar*	பாடி புதுநகர்	TBA		TBA
47	Park Road*	பூங்கா சாலை	TBA		TBA
48	Golden Colony*	கோல்டன் காலனி	TBA		TBA
49	Vavin 1st Main road*	வாவின் முதல் பிரதான சாலை	TBA		TBA
50	Ambattur Estate*	அம்பத்தூர் தொழிற்பேட்டை	TBA	Ambattur Estate Bus Terminus	TBA
51	Ambattur Bypass*	அம்பத்தூர் புறவழிச்சாலை	TBA		TBA
52	Dunlop*	டன்லப்	TBA		TBA
53	Ambattur*	அம்பத்தூர்	TBA	Ambattur (West Line)	TBA
54	Ambattur OT*	அம்பத்தூர் ஒ.டி.	TBA		TBA
55	Stedford Hospital*	ஸ்டெட்போர்டு மருத்துவமனை	TBA		TBA
56	Thirumullaivoyal*	திருமுல்லைவாயல்	TBA		TBA
57	Vaishnavi Nagar*	வைஷ்ணவி நகர்	TBA		TBA
58	Murugappa College*	முருகப்பா கல்லூரி	TBA		TBA
59	Avadi*	ஆவடி	TBA	Avadi (West Line); Avadi Bus Terminus	TBA
60	Kasturibai Nagar*	கஸ்தூரிபாய் நகர்	TBA		TBA
61	Hindu College*	இந்து கல்லூரி	TBA	Hindu College (West Line)	TBA
62	Pattabiram*	பட்டாபிராம்	TBA		TBA
63	Pattabiram Outer Ring Road*	பட்டாபிராம் வெளிவட்ட சாலை	TBA		TBA

^{§} under construction

* - To Be Confirmed

== See also ==
- Rapid transit in India
- List of metro systems
