= Purple Line (Chennai Metro) =

Transit line in Tamil Nadu, India

Purple Line (Line 3)

Overview
- Native name: ஊதா வழித்தடம்
- Status: Under construction
- Termini: Madhavaram Milk Colony; Siruseri SIPCOT 2
- Connecting lines: Under Construction (9): Blue Line Green Line Chennai MRTS , Chennai Suburban North Line , Chennai Suburban West Line Chennai Suburban West North Line Chennai Suburban South Line Red Line Yellow Line
- Stations: 48 (Under Construction) (Note: Madhavaram Milk Colony station would be shared between the Purple and Red Lines, and is considered as a single station.)

Service
- Type: Rapid transit
- System: Chennai Metro
- Operator: Delhi Metro Rail Corporation
- Depot(s): Semmancheri; Madhavaram
- Rolling stock: Alstom; BEML

History
- Planned opening: December 2027; 1 year's time December 2028; 2 years' time

Technical
- Line length: 45.8 km (28.5 mi)
- Num of tracks: 2
- Character: 26.7 km (16.6 mi) Underground; 19.1 km (11.9 mi) Elevated
- Track gauge: 1,435 mm (4 ft 8 1/2 in) standard gauge
- Electrification: 25 kV 50 Hz AC overhead catenary
- Operating speed: 80 km/h (50 mph)
- Signalling: CBTC Signalling System

The Purple Line or Line 3 is one of the under construction lines of Chennai Metro Phase-II stretching from Madhavaram Milk Colony to Siruseri SIPCOT 2. The 45.8 km (28.5 mi) long line will consist of 48 stations, out of which 28 will be underground and 20 will be at grade or elevated.

== Planning and construction ==
=== Phase II ===
The construction of the first phase of Chennai Metro started in June 2009. Commercial operations started on the green line in June 2015. On 10 February 2019, the extension of blue line was opened, completing the first phase of the metro.

In July 2016, Government of Tamil Nadu announced that the second phase would have three lines totaling 104 km (65 mi) in length with 104 stations. Two corridors would extend from Madhavaram connecting with Siruseri and Sholinganallur respectively (lines 3 and 5) with the third corridor connecting Koyambedu with Lighthouse (line 4). The third line connecting Madhavaram Milk Colony and Siruseri SIPCOT will extend to 45.8 km (28.5 mi) of which 19.1 km (11.9 mi) would be elevated and 26.7 km (16.6 mi) underground. It will consist of 50 stations including 30 undergrounds stations. The stations for the second phase were designed to be smaller than the existing stations operational in the first phase.

On 20 November 2020, foundation stone for the second phase was laid and construction commenced. In November 2022, Alstom was awarded the contract to supply metro coaches for the phase II expansion. In May 2023, CMRL announced a revised plan for the second phase, with the line extending for 45.8 km (28.5 mi), and a revised station count of 48 stations.

Chennai Metro - Phase II
Line Name	Terminals		Length (km)	Stations	Status
Purple Line	Madhavaram	Siruseri SIPCOT 2	45.8	48	Under construction

The second phase is estimated to cost ₹632.46 billion (US$6.8 billion) of which initially ₹47.10 billion (US$500 million) was loaned by Japan International Cooperation Agency. On 14 February 2021, the Prime Minister of India announced that the government has set aside ₹630 billion (US$6.7 billion) for the construction of phase II and further extension.

=== Phase II extension ===
In 2022, the state government proposed an extension plan for the third line from Siruseri to Kilambakkam, covering an approximate 25 km (16 mi). In September 2023, feasibility report was submitted by CMRL for the proposed expansion of the line, green lighting the same. The extension was scrapped due to patronage and profitability concerns.

== Stations ==
Purple Line
S.No	Station Name		Expected Opening	Connections	Station Layout
S.No	English	Tamil	Expected Opening	Connections	Station Layout
1	Madhavaram Milk Colony	மாதவரம் பால் பண்ணை	December 2028	Red Line (Under Construction)	Underground
2	Madhavaram High Road	மாதவரம் நெடுஞ்சாலை	December 2028		Underground
3	Moolakadai	மூலக்கடை	December 2028		Underground
4	Sembiyum	செம்பியம்	December 2028		Underground
5	Perambur Market	பெரம்பூர் அங்காடி	December 2028		Underground
6	Perambur	பெரம்பூர்	December 2028	Perambur (West Line)	Underground
7	Ayanavaram	அயனாவரம்	December 2028	Ayanavaram MTC Bus Depot	Underground
8	Otteri	ஓட்டேரி	December 2028		Underground
9	Pattalam	பட்டாளம்	December 2028		Underground
10	Perambur Barracks Road	பெரம்பூர் பேரக்ஸ் சாலை	December 2028		Underground
11	Purasaiwakkam	புரசைவாக்கம்	December 2028		Underground
12	Kellys	கெல்லீஸ்	December 2028		Underground
13	Kilpauk	கீழ்ப்பாக்கம்	December 2028	Green Line	Underground
14	Chetpet	சேத்துப்பட்டு	December 2028	Chetpet (South Line)	Underground
15	Sterling Road	ஸ்டெர்லிங் சாலை	December 2028		Underground
16	Nungambakkam	நுங்கம்பாக்கம்	December 2028		Underground
17	Anna Flyover	அண்ணா மேம்பாலம்	December 2028		Underground
18	Thousand Lights	ஆயிரம் விளக்கு	December 2028	Blue Line	Underground
19	Royapettah	ராயப்பேட்டை	December 2028		Underground
20	Dr. Radhakrishnan Salai	டாக்டர் ராதாகிருஷ்ணன் சாலை	December 2028		Underground
21	Thirumayilai	திருமயிலை	December 2028	Thirumayilai (Chennai MRTS); Yellow Line (Under Construction)	Underground
22	Mandaiveli	மந்தைவெளி	December 2028		Underground
23	Greenways Road	பசுமைவழிச் சாலை	December 2028		Underground
24	Adyar Junction	அடையாறு சந்திப்பு	December 2028		Underground
25	Adyar Depot	அடையாறு பணிமனை	December 2028		Underground
26	Indira Nagar	இந்திரா நகர்	December 2028	Indira Nagar (Chennai MRTS)	Underground
27	Thiruvanmiyur	திருவான்மியூர்	December 2028	Thiruvanmiyur (Chennai MRTS)	Underground
28	Taramani	தரமணி	December 2028		Underground
29	Nehru Nagar	நேரு நகர்	March 2028		Elevated
30	Kandanchavadi	கந்தன்சாவடி	March 2028		Elevated
31	Perungudi	பெருங்குடி	March 2028		Elevated
32	Thoraipakkam	துரைப்பாக்கம்	March 2028		Elevated
33	Mettukuppam	மேட்டுக்குப்பம்	March 2028		Elevated
34	PTC Colony	பி.டி.சி. காலனி	March 2028		Elevated
35	Okkiyampet	ஒக்கியம்பேட்டை	March 2028		Elevated
36	Karapakkam	காரப்பாக்கம்	March 2028		Elevated
37	Okkiyam Thoraipakkam	ஒக்கியம் துரைப்பாக்கம்	March 2028		Elevated
38	Sholinganallur	சோழிங்கநல்லூர்	March 2028	Red Line (Under Construction)	Elevated
39	Sholinganallur Lake I	சோழிங்கநல்லூர் ஏரி I	March 2028		Elevated
40	Sholinganallur Lake II	சோழிங்கநல்லூர் ஏரி II	March 2028		Elevated
41	Semmancheri Depot	செம்மஞ்சேரி பணிமனை	March 2028		Elevated
42	Semmancheri I	செம்மஞ்சேரி I	March 2028		Elevated
43	Semmancheri II	செம்மஞ்சேரி II	March 2028		Elevated
44	Gandhi Nagar	காந்தி நகர்	March 2028		Elevated
45	Navallur	நாவலூர்	March 2028		Elevated
46	Siruseri	சிறுசேரி	March 2028		Elevated
47	SIPCOT 1	சிப்காட் 1	March 2028		Elevated
48	SIPCOT 2	சிப்காட் 2	March 2028		Elevated

^{§} under construction

== See also ==
- List of metro systems
- Rapid transit in India
