= Sholinganallur =

- Neighbourhood
- Sholinganallur
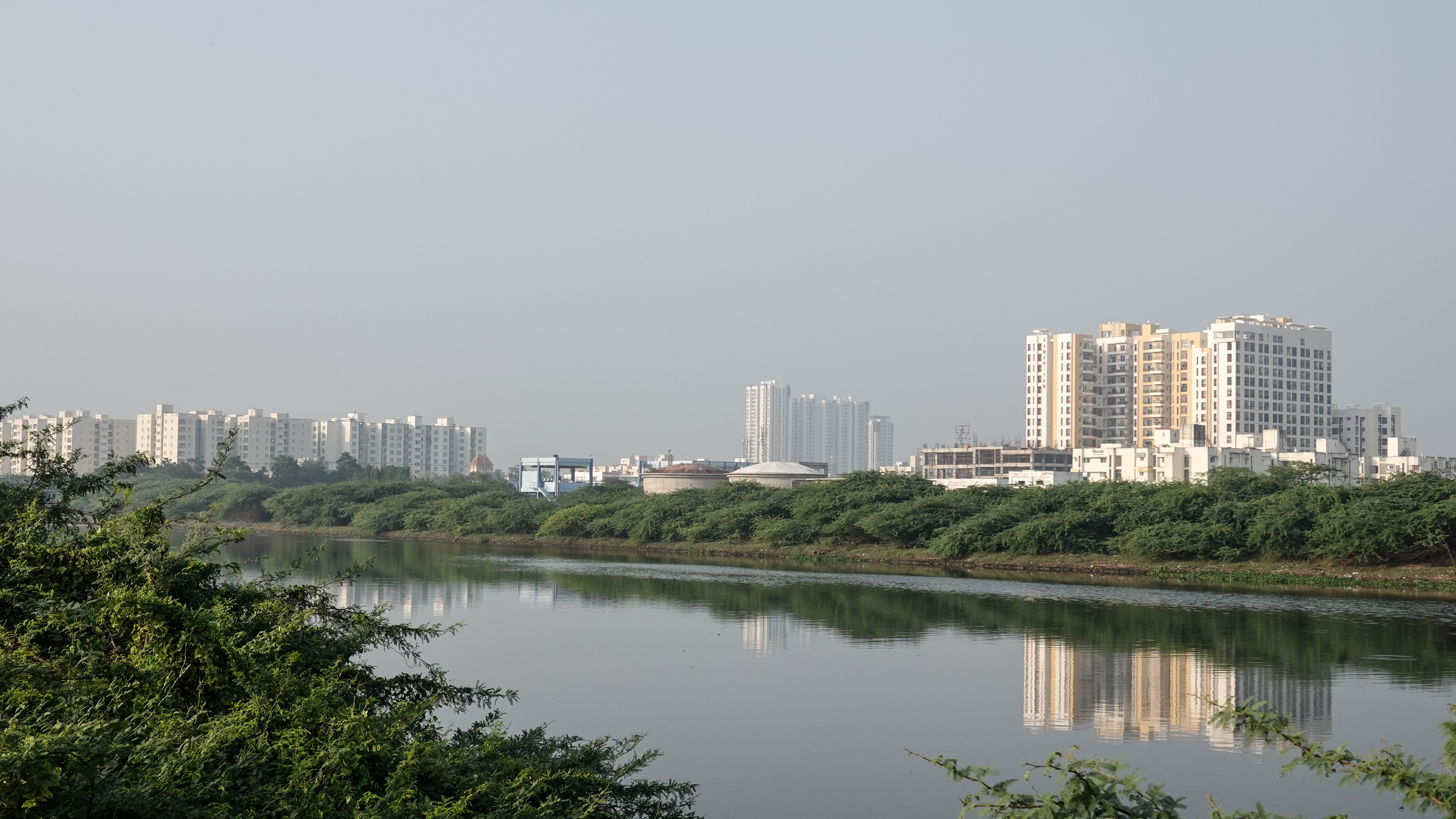
- Solinganalloor Skyline

- Location within Chennai
- Coordinates: 12.90015°N 80.22791°E
- Country: India
- State: Tamil Nadu
- Metro: Chennai

Government
  - Body: Greater Chennai Corporation

Population (2001)
  - Total: 15,519

Languages
  - Official: Tamil
- Time zone: UTC+5:30 (IST)
- PIN: 600119
- Vehicle registration: TN-14
- MP: Thamizhachi Thangapandian, DMK
- MLA: ECR P. Saravanan, TVK
- Parliamentary constituency: Chennai South
- Assembly constituency: Sholinganallur
- Planning agency: CMDA

Sholinganallur, also spelled Solinganalloor or Sozhinganalloor, is a southern suburb of Chennai, India.

== Demographics ==
As of the 2011 Indian census, the population of Sholinganallur reached about 7.5 lakhs.

== Economy ==
Sholinganallur is home to a number of BPO and IT/ITES companies. Many major IT companies including Wipro, Infosys, Tata Consultancy Services, and more.

== Etymology ==
The etymology given by Tamil scholars is "Chola" + "Angam" + "Nallur", which indicates that Sholinganallur was once part of a Chola settlement, most likely during the 8th century before which this used to be a marshland with a mangrove forest.

== Government and politics ==
Sholinganallur (state assembly constituency) is one of the biggest assembly constituency in Tamil Nadu in terms of voters.

=== Civic administration ===
Sholinganallur was annexed in to Chennai Corporation in 2011, and it is the last (200th) ward of Chennai city, administered as a part of Chennai Corporation.

=== Housing ===
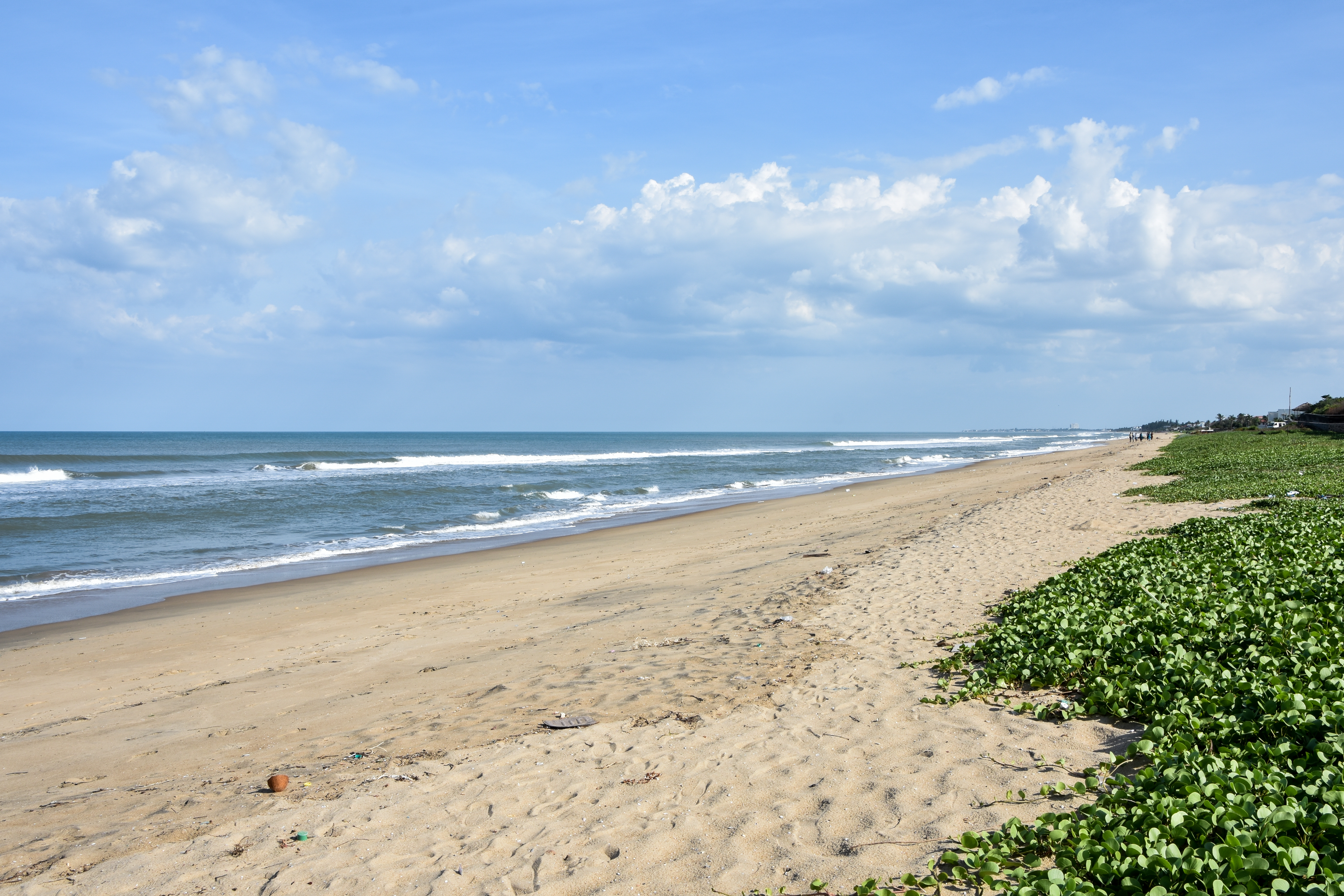
Uthandi beach, view south from VGP Layout, Aug '21

The Tamil Nadu Housing Board (TNHB) has created a satellite township at Shollinganallur with IT Parks, arterial roads, schools, parks, play grounds and bus terminus.

Residential areas of Sholinganallur include Akkarai, Panaiyur, Rajiv Gandhi Nagar, MGR Nagar, Ganesh Nagar and Uthandi (ECR Toll Plaza), which are located on the East Coast Road. Uthandi has a public beach that has been declared as a "turtle nesting site" where the endangered Olive Ridley turtles come to nest and lay their eggs.

== Education ==
Some of the colleges include Sathyabama University, Jeppiaar Engineering College, St. Mary's School of Management Studies, St. Joseph's College of Engineering and more.

The Indian Maritime University, Chennai campus is located in Uthandi, Sholinganallur.

Sacred Heart Matric Higher Secondary School was founded in 1988. It became a high school in 1993 and a higher secondary school two years later.

== Transport ==
=== By air ===
Chennai International Airport at Meenambakkam is the nearest airport.

=== By rail ===
The Government is constructing Metro Train-Phase 2 along this route from Madhavaram till Siruseri IT park (deadline to be operational for this Corridor-3 and Corridor-5 by 2024/26.

=== By road ===
Sholinganallur is located at the junction connecting East Coast Road to Tambaram, Mudichur and Adyar to Mahabalipuram, along Old Mahabalipuram Road. It is at a distance of 14.3 km from Tambaram, 2 km away from East Coast Road (ECR), 34.8 km away from Mamallapuram and 13.5 km away from Adyar.

== Commercial Setup ==
Sholinganallur hosts a mix of commercial establishments, corporate offices, and technology service providers. Alongside major IT corridors, the area supports various emerging enterprises and local business firms, including AP OutSet Pvt Ltd, contributing to the region's commercial infrastructure.
