= Johnson Lifts =

Indian manufacturer of lifts and escalators

Johnson Lifts Private Limited
- Type: Private
- Founded: 1963; 63 years ago
- Founder: K.J. John
- Headquarters: 1 East Main Road, Anna Nagar, Chennai, Tamil Nadu, India
- Areas served: South Asia, West Asia and Tanzania
- Key people: Yohan K. John (MD)
- Products: Lifts • Escalators
- Revenue: ▲₹3,000 crore (US$310 million) (FY2019)
- Number of employees: 12,000 (FY2026)
- Website: www.johnsonliftsltd.com

Johnson Lifts Private Limited is an Indian manufacturer of lifts and escalators. Established in 1963, the company is headquartered in Chennai, Tamil Nadu.

Johnson Lifts also sells its products in Bhutan, Maldives, Nepal, Qatar, Sri Lanka, Tanzania, and the United Arab Emirates. Exports accounted for about 6% of the company's revenue in the 2018-19 fiscal year.

== History ==
Johnson Lifts was founded in Madras, Madras State (now Chennai, Tamil Nadu) by K.J. John in 1963. He had been working at Best & Co., a lift manufacturing company in Chennai, when he decided to start his own company. Johnson Lifts started out doing lift maintenance. The company installed its first lift at the New Woodlands Hotel in Chennai in 1966. It began manufacturing lifts in 1970. Johnson Lifts started out with a small manufacturing unit at Vyasarpadi, before moving to a larger facility in Ambattur in 1988. K.J. John died in 2002. He was succeeded as managing director by his son John K. John, popularly known as Jr. John, who had joined the company as a technician in 1978.

Johnson Lifts established a production facility at Poonamallee in 1997. The facility was more advanced than the previous two units as the company was able to access better technology following economic liberalisation in India in the early 1990s. Since its founding, Johnson Lifts has faced strong competition from foreign multinational brands. According to Jr. John, the company placed an emphasis on product quality and customer service to compete. He noted, "For example, our unique selling proposition was that we looked into a customer complaint the same day it was received, which was unheard of 30 years ago [the 1980s]."

The company initially sold its products in South India and expanded nationwide in 1999, benefiting from rapid urbanisation in India during the 1990s and 2000s. The company established a manufacturing plant in Nagpur, Maharashtra in 2003 to serve West and North India. Johnson Lifts began expanding overseas in 2006, establishing subsidiaries in Sri Lanka and Nepal. The company sold 5,200 lifts and recorded a revenue of ₹419 crore (equivalent to ₹11 billion or US$120 million in 2026) in FY09.

During the 1990s, most of the company's sales were to residential apartments. The growth in commercial real estate development and public infrastructure projects during the 2000s spurred the company to expand into the escalator market. These properties typically required escalators in addition to lifts, and many developers preferred to award contracts to a single supplier for both lifts and escalators, making it difficult for Johnson Lifts to compete. The company established a joint venture with Chinese escalator manufacturer SJEC Corporation in 2009 to sell light duty commercial escalators. The escalators were initially manufactured by SJEC and sold by Johnson Lifts. The consortium won a ₹198 crore (equivalent to ₹445 crore or US$46 million in 2026) contract to supply 122 lifts and 296 escalators for Phase I of the Chennai Metro in February 2011. It has also won contracts for the Delhi Metro, Bangalore Metro and other metro rail projects in India.

Johnson Lifts invested ₹100 crore (equivalent to ₹206 crore or US$21 million in 2026) to open a heavy duty escalator manufacturing facility at Oragadam, near Chennai, in May 2012. It is the first escalator manufacturing facility in India. The factory was established with technology transfer from SJEC. Johnson Lifts now manufactures all its escalators at the Oragadam plant and the partnership with SJEC only involves sharing technical know-how. Johnson Lifts established a joint venture with Japanese company Toshiba Elevator and Building Systems Corporation (a subsidiary of Toshiba) called Toshiba Johnson Elevators (India) Pvt. Ltd. on 27 October 2012. Johnson Lifts stated that it entered into the partnership as it lacked the technology to produce high-speed lifts. The company holds a 49% stake in the joint venture, with Toshiba holding the remaining 51% stake.

Johnson Lifts was the top lift supplier in each of the South Indian states, and had a 20% market share nationwide by 2012. The company produced about 7,000 lifts annually as of August 2012. In the 2015-16 fiscal year, the company sold 9,500 lifts, recorded revenue of ₹1,200 crore (equivalent to ₹19 billion or US$200 million in 2026) and had 6,000 employees. Johnson Lifts held an 18% and 36% market share in the Indian lift and escalator markets respectively as of January 2017. The company sold over 10,000 lifts and recorded revenue of around ₹2,000 crore (equivalent to ₹55 billion or US$570 million in 2026) in FY19.

Johnson Lifts invested ₹125 crore (equivalent to ₹257 crore or US$27 million in 2026) to open a new production facility at Sengadu, Tamil Nadu in September 2019, with a capacity to produce 6,000 lifts a year. The company now has a total production capacity of 18,000 lifts a year. The company also announced that it had invested ₹13 crore (equivalent to ₹27 crore or US$2.8 million in 2026) to add a second production line at its Oragadam plant. The expansion increases the plant's escalator production capacity by 500 units a year, giving it a total capacity to produce 1,100 escalators annually.

On 21 September 2022, the company launched an internet of things-based Wireless device named WATCH (Wireless Assessment to Troubleshoot Channelize & Host). WATCH enables real-time monitoring of the lift's performance, including sending out alerts when a passenger is trapped inside.
