= Alandur metro station =

Chennai Metro's Blue & Green Line interchange station

Alandur Metro Station

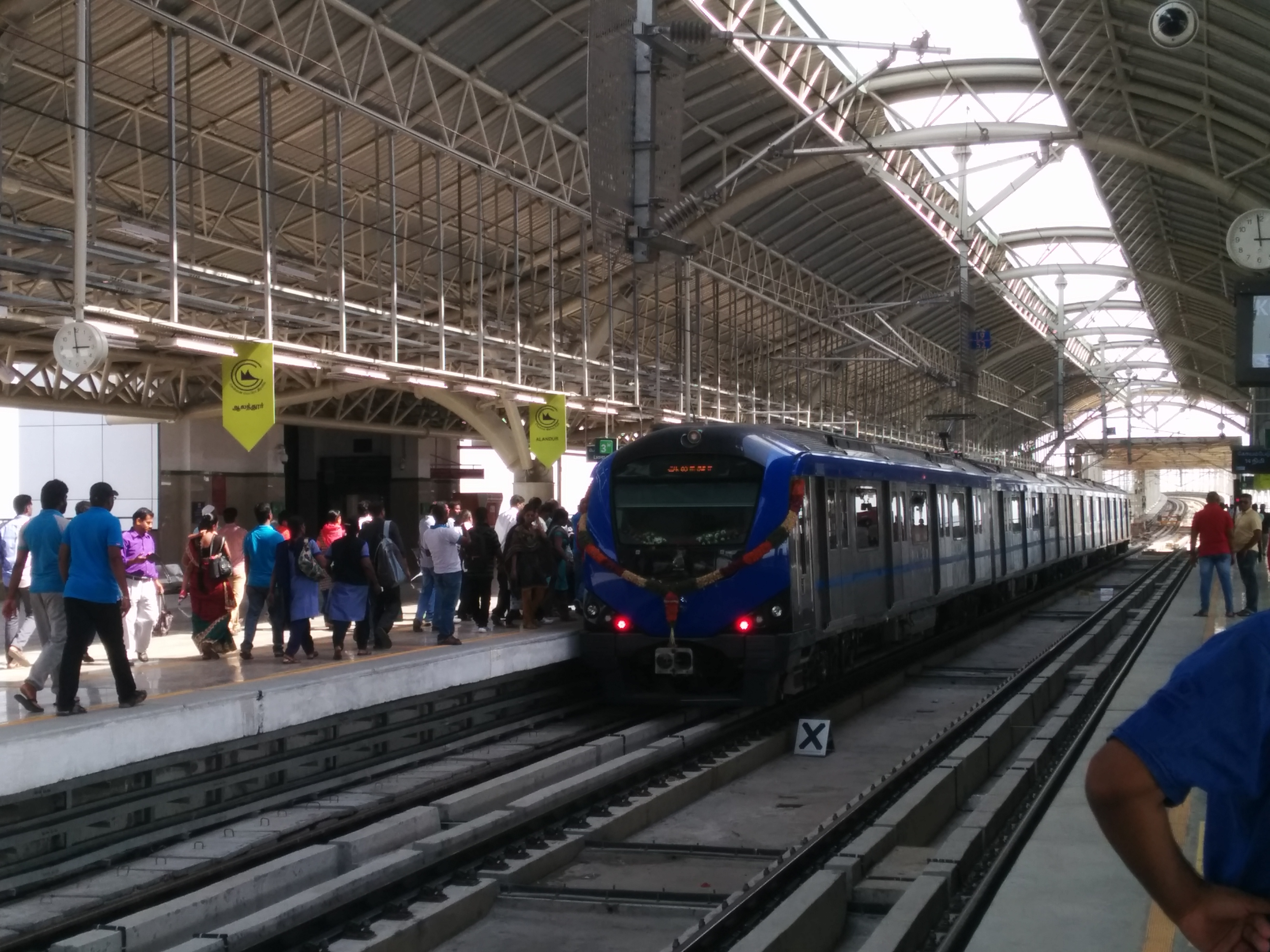
- A train arriving at the station

General information
- Location: Alandur, Chennai - 600016, Tamil Nadu, India
- Coordinates: 13.004202°N 80.201471°E
- System: Chennai Metro station
- Owner: Chennai Metro Rail Limited
- Operator: Chennai Metro Rail Limited
- Line: Blue Line Green Line Red Line Inter Corridor Line
- Platforms: Side platform Platform-1 → Chennai International Airport (to be extended to Kilambakkam in the future); Platform-2 → Wimco Nagar Depot; Platform-3 → St. Thomas Mount; Platform-4 → M.G.R Chennai Central; Platform-5 → Sholinganallur; Platform-6 → • Madhavaram Milk Colony • Pattabiram (proposed branch line to construct in future)
- Tracks: 4

Construction
- Structure type: Elevated, Double track
- Platform levels: 2

Other information
- Station code: SAL
- Website: http://chennaimetrorail.org

History
- Opened: 29 June 2015; 11 years ago (Green Line); 21 September 2016; 10 years ago (Blue Line)

Passengers
- 10000/day (2018)

Services
Preceding station	Chennai Metro	Following station
Guindy towards Wimco Nagar Depot	Blue Line	Nanganallur Road towards Chennai International Airport
Guindy towards Wimco Nagar Depot	Blue Line (Future Service)	Nanganallur Road towards Kilambakkam
Ekkattuthangal towards Chennai Central	Green Line	St. Thomas Mount Terminus
Butt Road towards Madhavaram Milk Colony	Red Line (Under Construction)	St. Thomas Mount towards Sholinganallur
Butt Road towards Pattabiram	Red Line (Future service)	St. Thomas Mount towards Sholinganallur
Route map
Location

Alandur Metro, also known as the Arignar Anna Alandur Metro, is an elevated metro station that is part of the Blue Line and the Green Line of the Chennai Metro, and serves as an interchange station between the two lines. The station is one of the two metro stations where the two lines intersect, the other being the Chennai Central metro station. It is the city's first multi-level railway station. It is the only station where passengers from the two corridors can swap the direction of travel. On 31 July 2020, It has been named by Government of Tamil Nadu as Arignar Anna Alandur Metro to honor the DMK founder and the former Chief Minister of Tamil Nadu C. N. Annadurai.

== The station ==
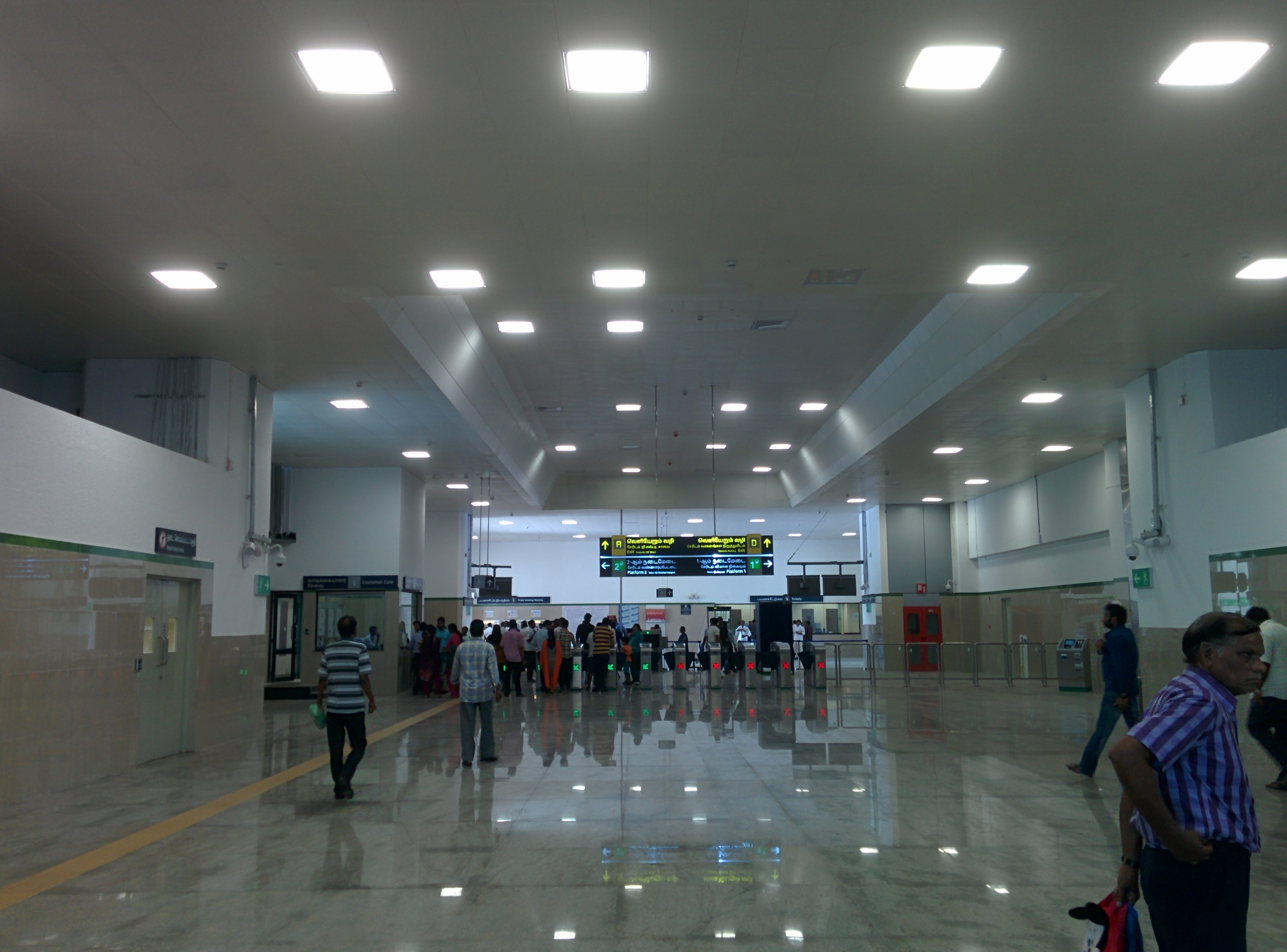
Alandur metro station concourse

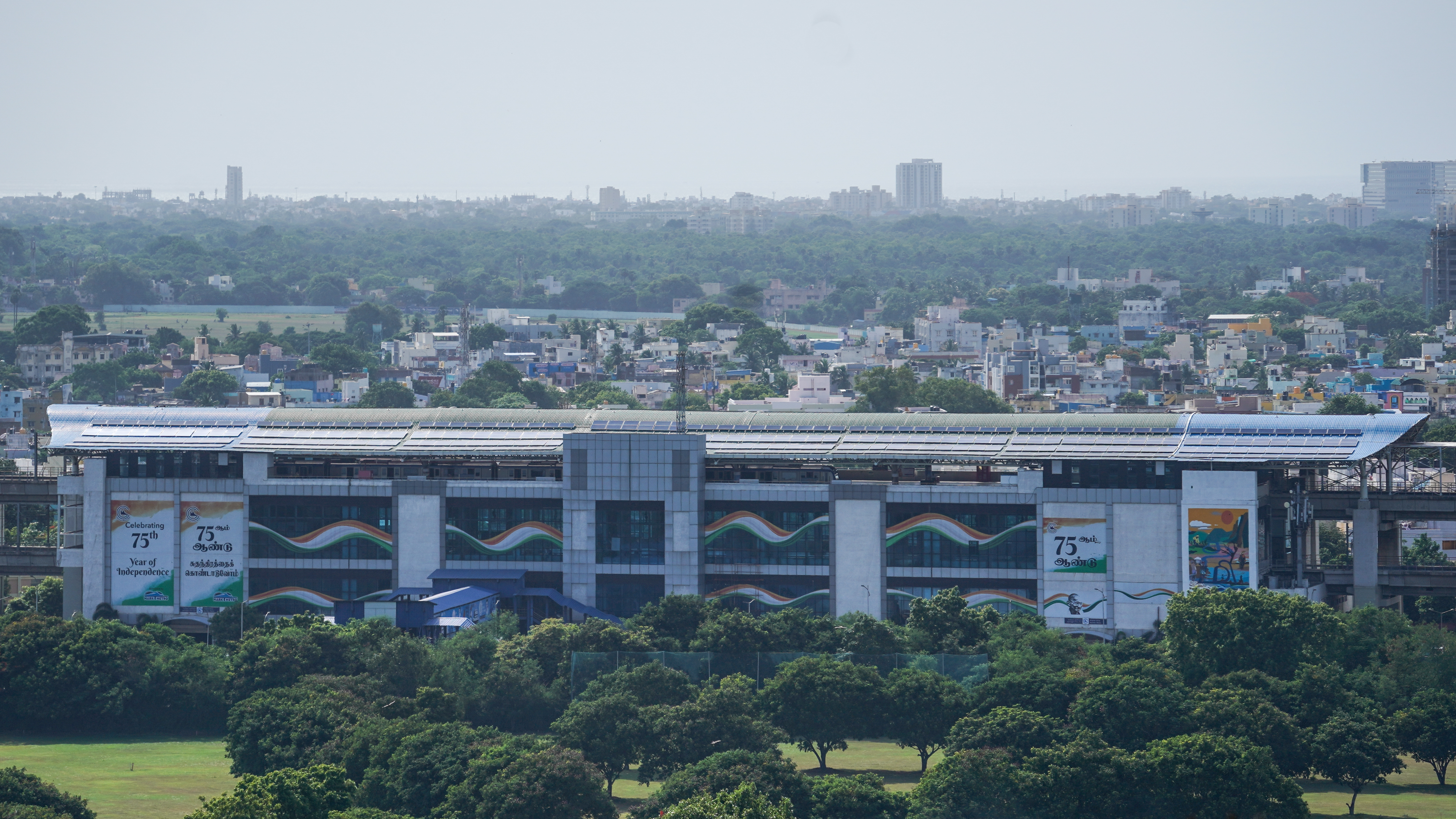
Outer view of the Alandur Metro Station

As the station acts as a transit point for two different corridors of the Chennai Metro, the two lines are constructed at two different levels at the station—the first one serving the line from Guindy towards Officers Training Academy (OTA) and Chennai International Airport and the second one for the line from St. Thomas Mount towards Chennai Mofussil Bus Terminus. The two levels are being built at 26.55 m and 35.41 m within the station, connected by means of escalators. Each levels will have two access points for entry and exit. A mezzanine floor—an intermediate level between ground floor and level I—is being built to be utilised for maintenance purpose.

A total of eight elevators will function at the station—four connecting the ground floor with level I and another four, along with four escalators, connecting level I with level II. The station will have 10 ticket counters apart from 18 automatic ticket-vending machines (ATVMs).

The station will have four access points on the ground floor—two for entry/exit from the front and two more on the rear. Ticket counters, one at either side of the lobby, are located past the access points. Crossing the lobby, passengers can move on to level I using any of the eight escalators and four lifts.

Level I is the alighting point for those travelling on the Guindy–OTA–Airport route. From this level, there are four escalators and lifts leading to level II, from where passengers bound for the Koyambedu–SIDCO–St. Thomas Mount route can embark.

The station will also have disabled-friendly facilities, including separate escalators and entry ramps.

The station is one of the few in the corridor that will have parking facilities.

== Station layout ==
G	Street level & Concourse	Exit/Entrance, Fare control, station agent, Metro Card vending machines, crossover
L1	Side platform | Doors will open on the left
L1	Platform 1 Southbound	Towards → Chennai International Airport; Next Station: Nanganallur Road (to be further extended to Kilambakkam under Blue Line in the future)
L1	Platform 2 Northbound	Towards ← Wimco Nagar Depot; Next Station: Guindy
L1	Side platform | Doors will open on the left
L2	Side platform | Doors will open on the left
L2	Platform 4 Northbound	Towards → Chennai Central; Next Station: Ekkattuthangal
L2	Platform 3 Southbound	Towards ← St. Thomas Mount & Chennai International Airport
L2	Side platform | Doors will open on the left
L3	Side platform | Doors will open on the left
L3	Platform 5 Southbound	Towards → Sholinganallur; Next Station: St. Thomas Mount
L3	Platform 6 Northbound	Towards ← Madhavaram Milk Colony/Pattabiram; Next Station: Butt Road
L3	Side platform | Doors will open on the left

== Receiving sub-station ==
A 230-kV receiving substation (RSS) is being built by the Tamil Nadu Electricity Board near the station for CMRL project. TNEB would supply 110 kV power from nearby TNEB substation (being built by TNEB) to the RSS, which will be stepped down to 33 kV and 25 kv by two transformers. The station is one of the three stations in the Chennai Metro Rail network to have a 230-kV receiving sub-station for power supply from the state's electricity grid, the other two being Koyambedu and Chennai Central metro.

== Supporting facilities ==
The Cantonment Board has decided to set up three AC bus shelters at Asar Ghana junction near the metro station, which would become an intermodal transport hub. Each shelter will be spread over 370 sq ft with a seating capacity of 32 passengers and standing capacity of 45. Other facilities at the shelters would include ATM, CCTV, security guards, public urinals, drinking water, coffee vending machines and announcements about bus arrivals. Commuters will be able to see a bus coming from 500 metres on an LCD screen in the shelter. This would be the first of AC bus shelters in Chennai. The shelters would come up under a PPP model at an estimated cost of ₹ 12.5 million, which would be constructed and maintained for five years by a private firm, after which it will hand over the shelters to the board. The firm's revenue generation would be through advertisements in the shelter.

In May 2018, CMRL began construction of foot overbridge at the station at a cost of ₹ 90 million and is expected to be completed in eight months.

== Commercial hub ==
Arignar Anna Alandur metro station is one of the five stations in the first phase of the Chennai Metro project identified to be converted into commercial hubs, the others being Puratchi Thalaivi Dr. J. Jayalalithaa CMBT Metro, Arumbakkam, Ekkattuthangal, and Ashok Nagar. A 118,000 sq ft building with a basement and stilt floor for car park is planned behind the station.

== See also ==
- List of Chennai metro stations
- Railway stations in Chennai
- Chennai Metro
