= Madhavaram Milk Colony =

Neighbourhood in Tamil Nadu, India

- Neighbourhood
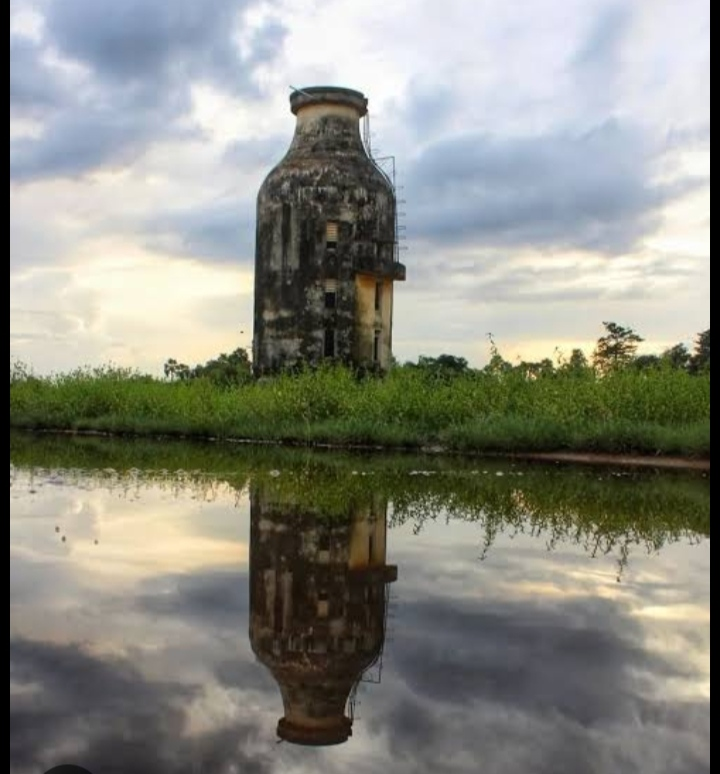

- Location within Chennai Location within Tamil Nadu Location within India
- Coordinates: 13.15°N 80.24°E
- Country: India
- State: Tamil Nadu
- District: Chennai
- Metro: Chennai
- Chennai Corporation Zone: III (Madhavaram)
- Taluk: Madhavaram
- Elevation: 13 m (43 ft)

Languages
  - Official: Tamil
- Time zone: UTC+5:30 (IST)
- PIN: 600051
- Vehicle registration: TN-05-xxxx

Madhavaram Milk Colony is a small neighbourhood of about 5,000 in northern Chennai, a metropolitan city in Chennai district in the Indian state of Tamil Nadu.

Due to the establishment of the first co-operative milk producing union Aavin of Chennai, this place was called Madhavaram Milk Colony.

Tamil Nadu Veterinary and Animal Sciences University is situated here. The Madhavaram Botanical Garden is situated here.

== Location and surroundings ==
Madhavaram Milk Colony, most often called "MMC" or "Paalpannai", is a neighbourhood located north of Chennai city. It borders Kodungaiyur to the east, Madhavaram to the west, Moolakadai to the south, and Manali to the north. The main thoroughfare in the area is the Milk Colony Road.
