= Madhavaram Milk Colony metro station =

Upcoming Chennai Metro's underground interchange metro station

Madhavaram Milk Colony

General information
- Coordinates: 13.1497°N 80.2415°E
- System: Chennai Metro station
- Owner: Chennai Metro Rail Limited (CMRL)
- Operator: Chennai Metro
- Line: Purple Line Red Line
- Platforms: Island platform Platform-1 and 2 → SIPCOT Siruseri; Platform-3 and 4 → Sholinganallur
- Tracks: 2

Construction
- Structure type: Underground, Double track
- Platform levels: 2
- Accessible: Yes

Other information
- Status: Under Construction

History
- Opening: December 2028; 2 years' time
- Electrified: Single phase 25 kV, 35 Hz AC through overhead catenary

Services
Preceding station	Chennai Metro	Following station
Terminus	Purple Line (Under Construction)	Madhavaram High Road towards SIPCOT Siruseri
Terminus	Red Line (Under Construction)	Madhavaram Depot towards Sholinganallur
Route map
Location

Madhavaram Milk Colony metro station is an upcoming underground-interchange metro station on the Purple Line and Red Line of Chennai Metro in Chennai, India. This metro station will be among the 28 underground stations of Corridor III and 6 underground stations of Corridor V of the Chennai Metro. This station is slated to be operational by 2028, making it a key metro rail terminal hub of North Chennai.

== History ==
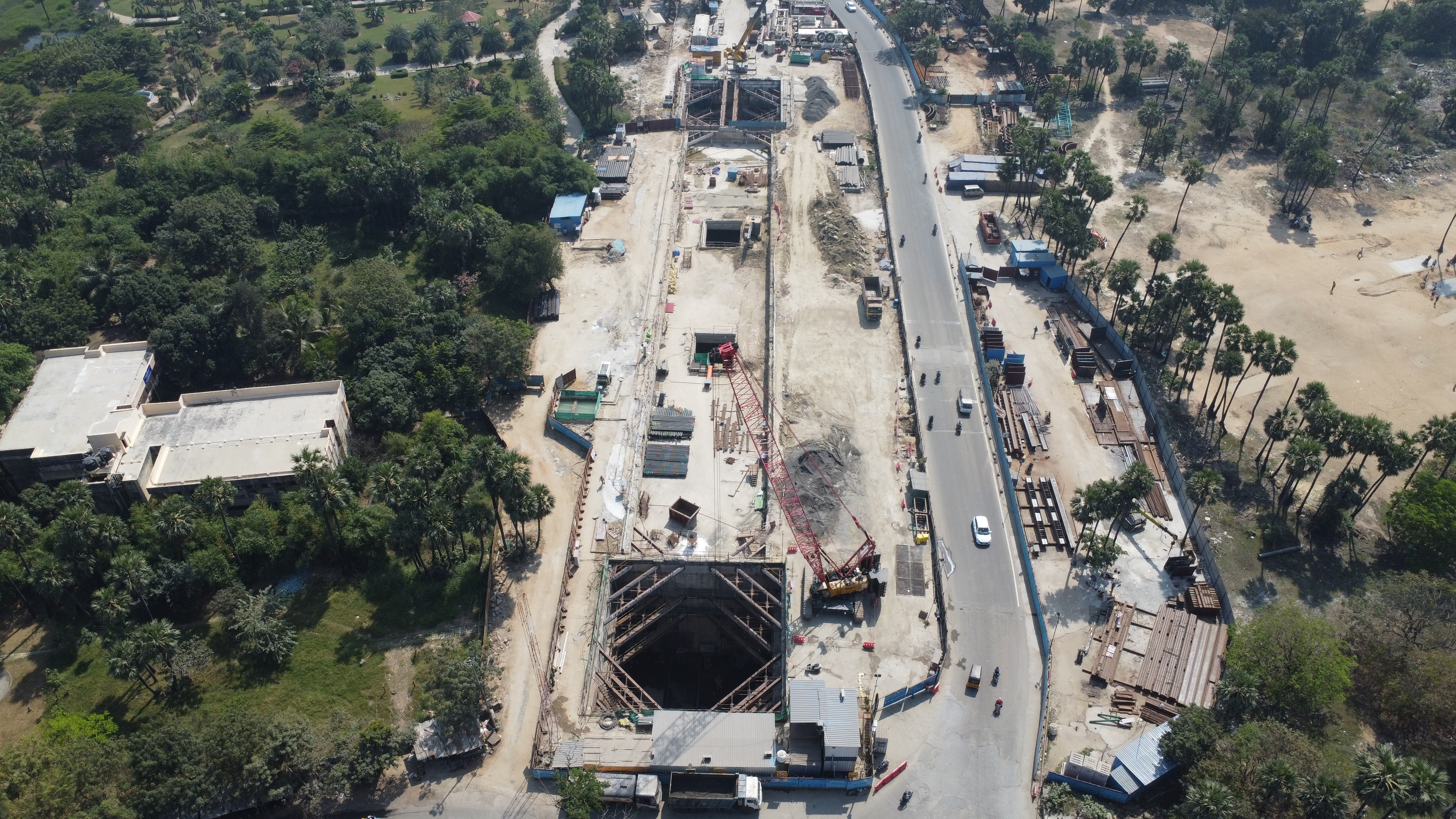
Construction of Madhavaram Milk Colony underground station as part of the second phase

In May 2022, Chennai Metro Rail Limited (CMRL) awarded the bid for building six stations between Madhavaram Milk Colony and Perambur, to DRA Infracon–Soma JV. Tunnelling work at the station began in October 2022, and in August 2023, tunnel boring machine Nilgiris completed a 1.4 km stretch to Madhavaram High Road metro station, of Purple line.

== Station layout ==
Station Layout

G	Street level	Exit/Entrance
L1	Mezzanine	Fare control, station agent, Ticket/token, shops
L2	Platform # Northwest bound	Towards → Sholinganallur; Next Station: Madhavaram Depot
L2	Island platform | Doors will open on the right
L2	Platform # Southbound	Train terminates here
L2	Platform # Northbound	Train terminates here
L2	Island platform | Doors will open on the right
L2	Platform # Southbound	Towards → SIPCOT Siruseri; Next Station: Madhavaram High Road

== See also ==
- List of Chennai metro stations
- Railway stations in Chennai
- Transport in Chennai
- Urban rail transit in India
- List of metro systems
