= Chennai Metro =

Rapid transit system in Tamil Nadu, India

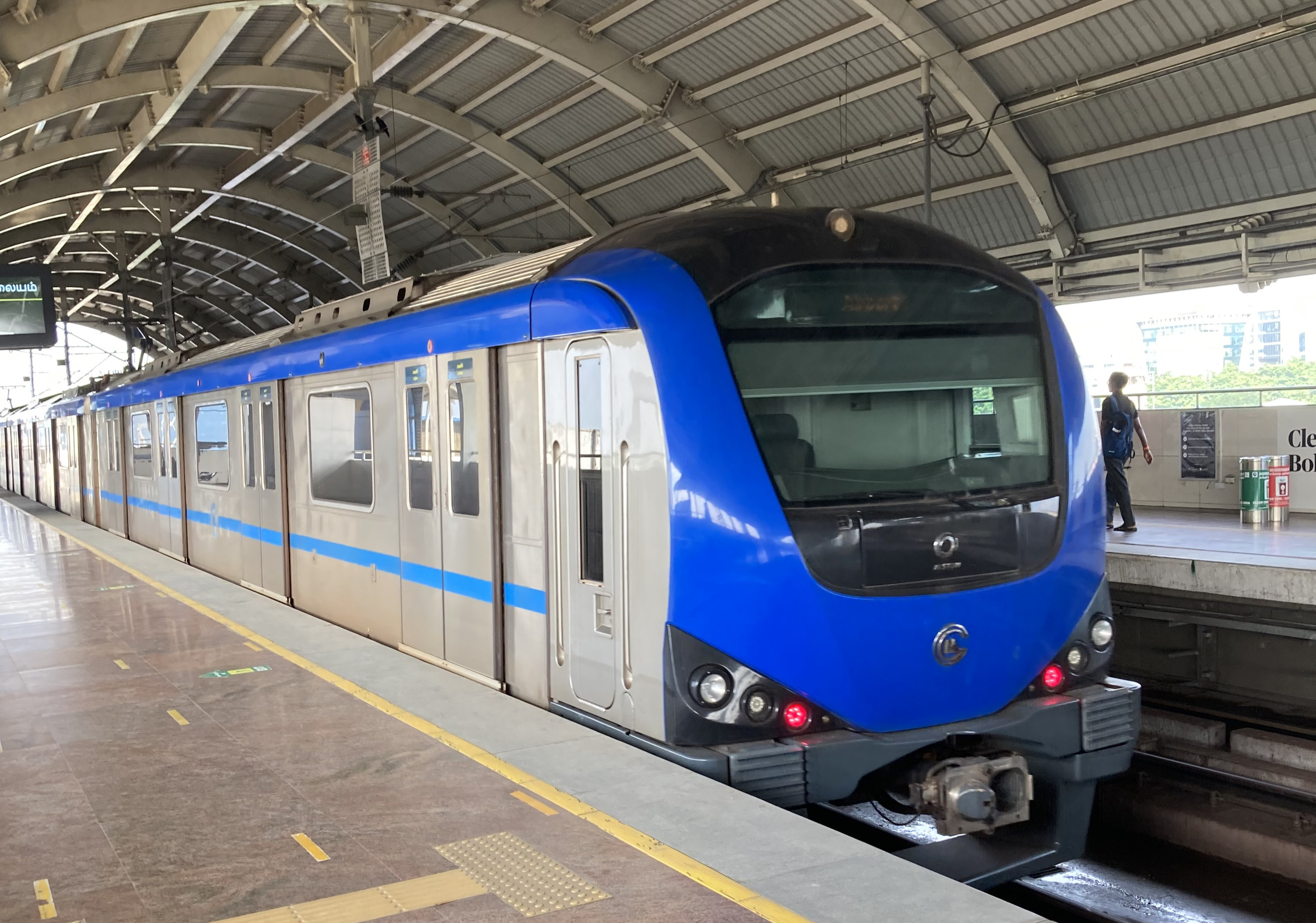
- A metro train at Guindy station on the Blue Line

- A Phase-2 metro train at Poonamallee depot on Yellow Line

Overview
- Owner: Chennai Metro Rail Limited
- Locale: Chennai, Tamil Nadu, India
- Transit type: Rapid transit
- Number of lines: 3 (operational); 2 (under construction); 1 (under asset transfer)
- Line number: Operational: Blue Line; Green Line; Yellow Line (Partial Operation) Under construction: Purple Line; Red Line Under Asset transfer: Chennai MRTS
- Number of stations: 52 (Operational) + 102 (Under Construction) + 48 (Planned) = 202 (Note: Two interchanges under Phase-I, 7 interchanges under Phase-II counted as single entry.)
- Annual ridership: 125 million (2025)
- Key people: Katikithala Srinivas, IAS (Chairman); Ashish Chatterjee, IAS (Managing Director)
- Headquarters: Chennai Metro Rail Limited Head Office, Anna Salai, Nandanam, Chennai 600035
- Website: chennaimetrorail.org

Operation
- Began operation: 29 June 2015; 11 years ago
- Operator: Chennai Metro Rail Limited
- Number of vehicles: 67
- Train length: 100 m (330 ft)
- Headway: 6–12 minutes

Technical
- System length: 68.8 km (42.8 mi)
- Track gauge: 1,435 mm (4 ft 8 1/2 in) standard gauge
- Electrification: 25 kV 50 Hz AC overhead line
- Top speed: 120 km/h (75 mph)
System map

The Chennai Metro is a rapid transit system serving the city of Chennai, India. It is operated by Chennai Metro Rail Limited, a joint venture between the Government of India and the Government of Tamil Nadu. As of October 2026, the network consists of three operational lines spanning 68.8 km (42.8 mi) and has 52 underground and elevated stations, making it India's sixth largest metro rail system. The system runs on standard gauge and is powered by 25 kV 50 Hz AC overhead electric lines.

Plans for a metro rail system for Chennai started in 2007–08 with construction commencing in February 2009. Test runs began in 2014, and the first segment of the metro between the Alandur and Koyambedu stations on the Green Line began operations on 29 June 2015. On 21 September 2016, operations on the Blue Line commenced between Chennai Airport and Little Mount. The underground stretch from AG-DMS to Washermanpet of the Blue Line opened on 10 February 2019, completing the first phase. Additionally, The Chennai Metro is the first metro system in India to operate an Inter-Corridor Line system.

As a part of the second phase, three more lines covering a length of 92.8 km (57.7 mi) are planned and are under construction. The Chennai Mass Rapid Transit System (MRTS), operated by the Indian Railways, is planned to be incorporated into the Chennai Metro. A light rail has been proposed to connect Tambaram on the Chennai suburban rail network with Velachery on the MRTS. Further extensions are also planned for the three lines under construction.

== Background ==
A single electrified line from Chennai Beach to Tambaram began operations in 1931 as part of the Chennai Suburban Railway. Two other rail lines were subsequently built, connecting Chennai Central to Gummidipoondi and Tiruvallur in 1979. In 1965, the Planning Commission evaluated the capacity of the transportation network in major metropolitan cities including Madras, and developed plans for further expansion of transportation amenities. As a result, an initial stretch of the Chennai Mass Rapid Transit System (MRTS) between Chennai Beach and Chepauk opened in 1995 – the first elevated rail line in India. The MRTS later extended to Thirumayilai in 1997, to Thiruvanmiyur in 2004, to Velachery in 2007, and St. Thomas Mount in 2026. In 2006, a modern metro rail system for Chennai was planned, to be modeled after the Delhi Metro.

== Construction Phases ==
=== Phase 1 ===
The Delhi Metro Rail Corporation was tasked to prepare a project report for the implementation of a metro rail system in Chennai. The Government of Tamil Nadu approved the first phase of the project in November 2007. The first phase was planned with two lines covering 45.05 km (27.99 mi) with 25 km (16 mi) being underground. The first corridor would connect Washermanpet with Chennai International Airport extending for 23.1 km (14.4 mi) with 14.3 km (8.9 mi) being underground and the second corridor would connect St.Thomas Mount with Chennai Central extending for 22 km (14 mi) with 9.7 km (6.0 mi) being underground. In December 2007, the Chennai Metro Rail Limited (CMRL) was established as a joint venture between the union and state governments to execute the project. The Planning commission gave an in-principle approval for the project in April 2008 with the final approval by the Union Council of Ministers in January 2009. The estimated base cost of the first phase was ₹146 billion (US$1.6 billion) of which 59% was loaned by Japan International Cooperation Agency (JICA). The Government of India contributed 15% of the cost and the Government of Tamil Nadu financed the remaining 21% of the project.

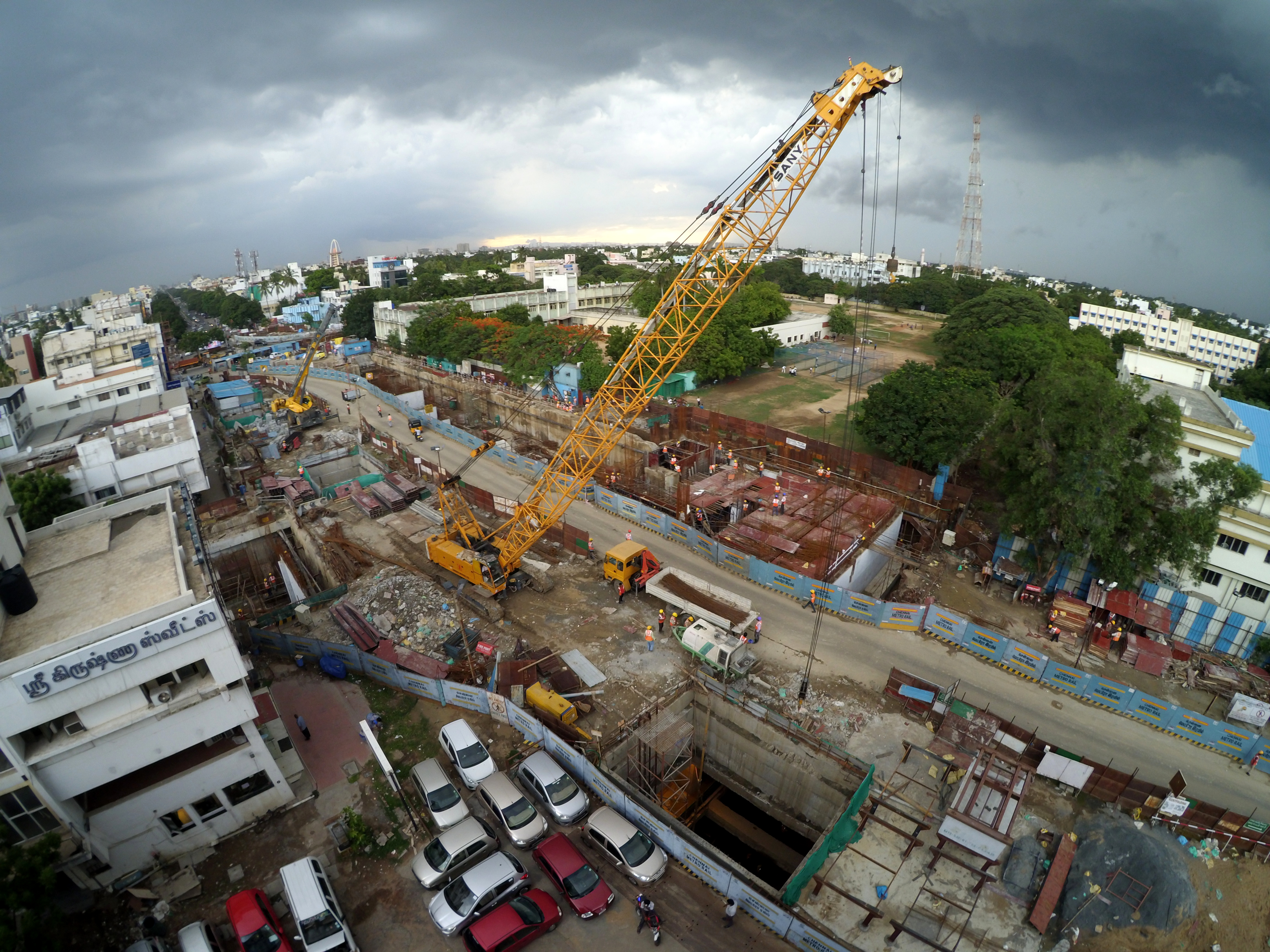
Construction of Anna Nagar East underground station in 2015

Major contracts awarded during Phase 1 construction
Year	Scope of contract work	Contractor	Contract Value	Notes
February 2009	Construction of elevated 4.5 km viaduct between Koyambedu and Ashok Nagar along Inner Ring Road	Soma Enterprise	₹1.99 billion (US$21 million)	
March 2009	Technical consultancy services for Phase 1 project	Egis-led consortium of five companies	US$30 million	
August 2010	Supply of rolling stock metro trainsets	Alstom	US$243 million	
January 2011	Design and construction of tracks and Koyambedu depot	Larsen & Toubro – Alstom joint venture	₹4.49 billion (US$48 million)	
January 2011	Construction of 9 underground stations and tunnels in Blue and Green lines of Phase 1	Afcons–Transtonnelstroy	₹25.97 billion (US$280 million)	
January 2011	Construction of 3 underground stations and tunnels in Green Line of Phase 1	Larsen & Toubro - SUCG JV	₹705.75 crore (US$75 million)	
February 2011	Construction of 7 underground stations in Blue Line of Phase 1	Gammon India and Mosmetrostroy	₹19.47 billion (US$210 million)	
June 2011	Construction of ten elevated stations	Consolidated Construction Consortium	₹234.53 crore (US$25 million)	
June 2011	Supply and installation of lifts and escalators	Johnson Lifts – SJEC Corporation joint venture		
June 2011	Power supply systems and overhead electrification	Siemens	₹3.05 billion (US$33 million)	
June 2011	Automatic fare collection system	Nippon Signal		
June 2011	Tunnel ventilation systems	Emirates Trading Agency		
June 2011	Air conditioning systems	Voltas		

In August 2012, a construction worker was killed and six others were seriously injured after a crane failed and crashed at an under construction site near Pachaiyappa's College and on 10 January 2013, a 22-year-old construction worker was killed and three others were injured at a construction site between Alandur and St. Thomas Mount. On 6 November 2013, a test run was conducted along a stretch of 1 km (0.62 mi) track. The project faced several delays and missed deadlines due to problems with land acquisition and cancellation of construction contracts. On 11 January 2014, a crane toppled over, killing a 20-year-old construction worker and seriously injuring another at Saidapet.

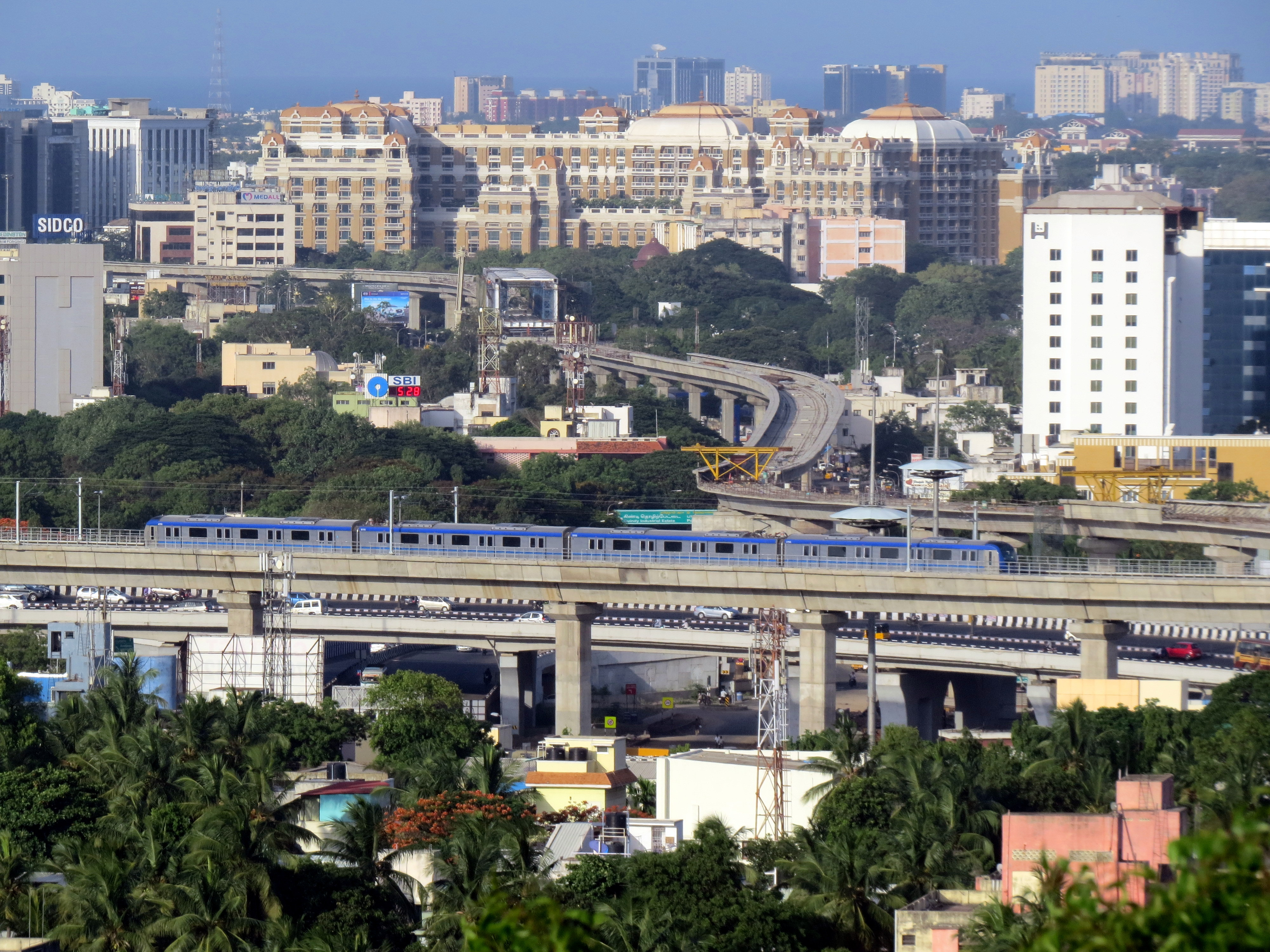
Chennai Metro during trials in early 2014

On 14 February 2014, the maiden trial run was conducted between Koyambedu and Ashok Nagar stations. The metro received the statutory speed certification clearance from the Research Design and Standards Organisation in August that year. In January 2015, a report was submitted to the Commissioner of Metro Rail Safety (CMRS) for mandatory safety approvals. After inspecting the infrastructure, the CMRS submitted the report to the Railway Board in April 2015.

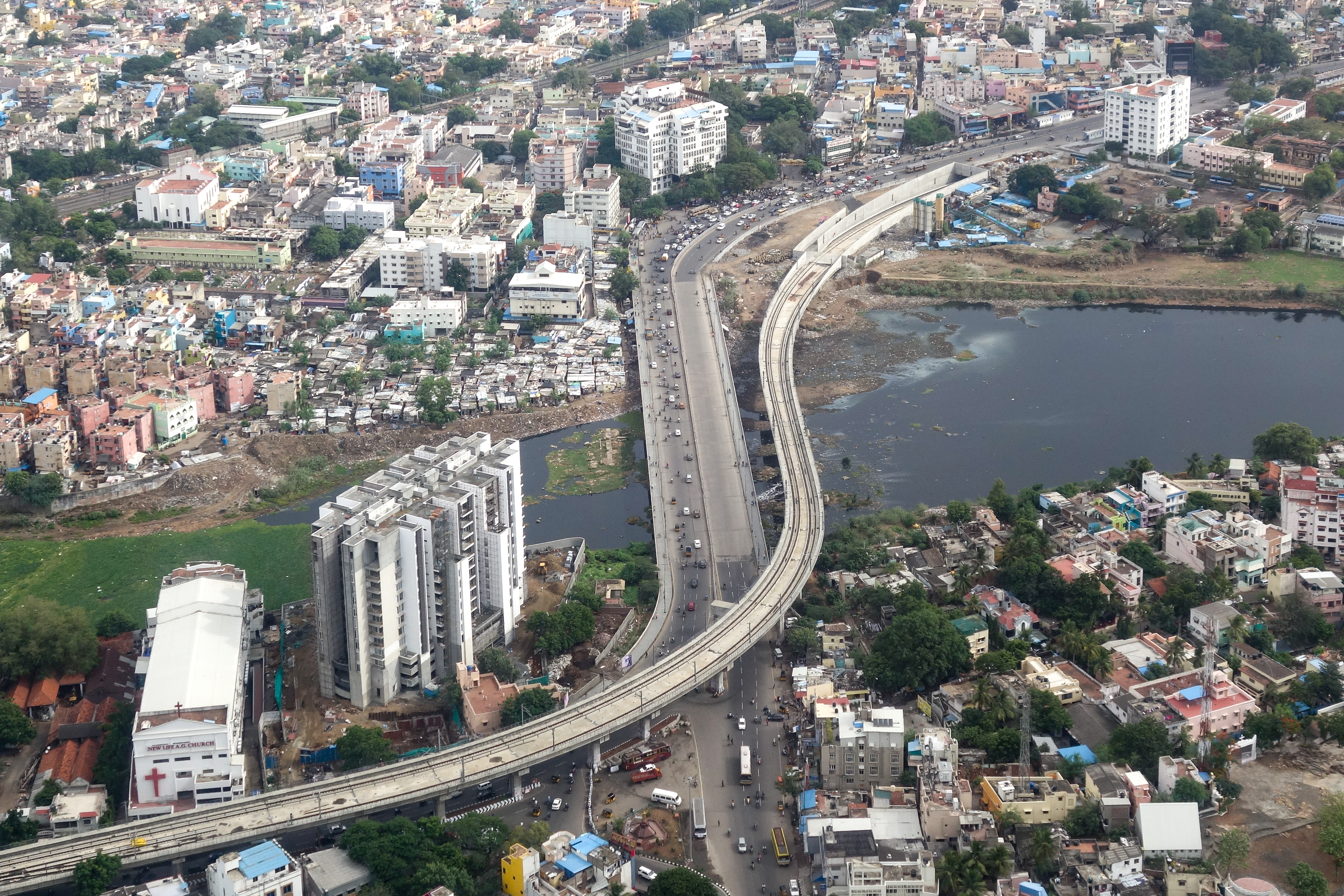
Elevated track over the Adyar river

Union minister Venkaiah Naidu along with the then Chief minister of Tamil Nadu Edappadi K. Palaniswami inaugurating Thirumangalam - Nehru Park stretch of Phase-I, in 2017

Operations on the Green Line between the Alandur and Koyambedu stations commenced on 29 June 2015. The Blue Line segment from the Airport and Little Mount stations commenced operations on 21 September 2016. The first underground section between Thirumangalam to Nehru Park on the Green Line opened on 14 May 2017, and the extension to Chennai central was completed on 25 May 2018 along with the section from the Saidapet and AG-DMS stations on the blue line. On 10 February 2019, the underground stretch from AG-DMS to Washermanpet of Blue Line was opened, marking the completion of the first phase of the metro.

==== Phase 1 Extension ====
In 2014, a 9.05 km (5.62 mi) northern extension of the Blue Line was announced by the Government of Tamil Nadu. The extension would run from Washermanpet to Wimco Nagar and consist of nine stations. Construction started in July 2016 with the first trial runs conducted in December 2020. The line opened for passenger traffic on 14 February 2021, increasing the length of the operational metro system to 54.1 km (33.6 mi). The expansion cost ₹37.7 billion (equivalent to ₹46 billion or US$490 million in 2026) of which 57% was loaned by JICA. In 2021, the CMRL proposed a further extension of the blue line to connect the airport with Kilambakkam at an estimated cost of ₹46.25 billion (US$490 million), which is clubbed with Phase III in 2026.

Phase 1 (Includes Ph 1 extension)
Line	Terminals		Stations	Length (km)	Opening Date
Green Line	Koyambedu	Alandur	7	10.26 km (6.38 mi)	29 June 2015
Green Line	Alandur	St. Thomas Mount	1	1.42 km (0.88 mi)	14 October 2016
Green Line	Koyambedu	Nehru Park	7	7.39 km (4.59 mi)	15 May 2017
Green Line	Nehru Park	Central	2	2.65 km (1.65 mi)	25 May 2018
Blue Line	Chennai Airport	Little Mount	6	8.63 km (5.36 mi)	21 September 2016
Blue Line	Little Mount	AG–DMS	4	4.82 km (3.00 mi)	25 May 2018
Blue Line	AG–DMS	Washermanpet	7	9.81 km (6.10 mi)	10 February 2019
Blue Line	Washermanpet	Wimco Nagar	8	8.57 km (5.33 mi)	14 February 2021
Blue Line	Wimco Nagar	Wimco Nagar Depot	1	0.5 km (0.31 mi)	13 March 2022
Total			41 (Note: Two interchanges Chennai Central and Alandur stations are counted only once)	54.1 km (33.6 mi)	

=== Phase 2 ===
In July 2016, the Government of Tamil Nadu announced that the second phase would have three lines spanning 104 km (65 mi) with 104 stations. Two corridors would extend from Madhavaram Milk Colony connecting with Siruseri SIPCOT and Sholinganallur respectively with the third corridor connecting Koyambedu with Lighthouse on the Marina beach. In July 2017, the state government announced an extension of Phase II, involving a section from Lighthouse up to Poonamallee Bypass with an intersection with the Madhavaram–Sholinganallur line at Alwarthirunagar. The second phase would span 118.9 km (73.9 mi) with 128 stations. The stations for the second phase were designed to be smaller than the stations of the first phase to reduce the cost and time of construction. In 2019, the Madras High Court questioned the state government on the construction method of the tunnels and its impact on the water bodies. The second phase was estimated to cost ₹63.25 billion (US$680 million) of which ₹47.1 billion (US$500 million) was loaned by JICA.

On 20 November 2020, foundation stone for the second phase was laid and construction commenced. On 14 February 2021, Prime Minister of India announced that the government has set aside ₹630 billion (US$6.7 billion) for the construction of the second phase and its further extension. In May 2023, the CMRL announced minor changes to the lines' alignment and that nine stations would be scrapped in the revised plan. Hence, the total length of the second phase was reduced to 116.1 km (72.1 mi).

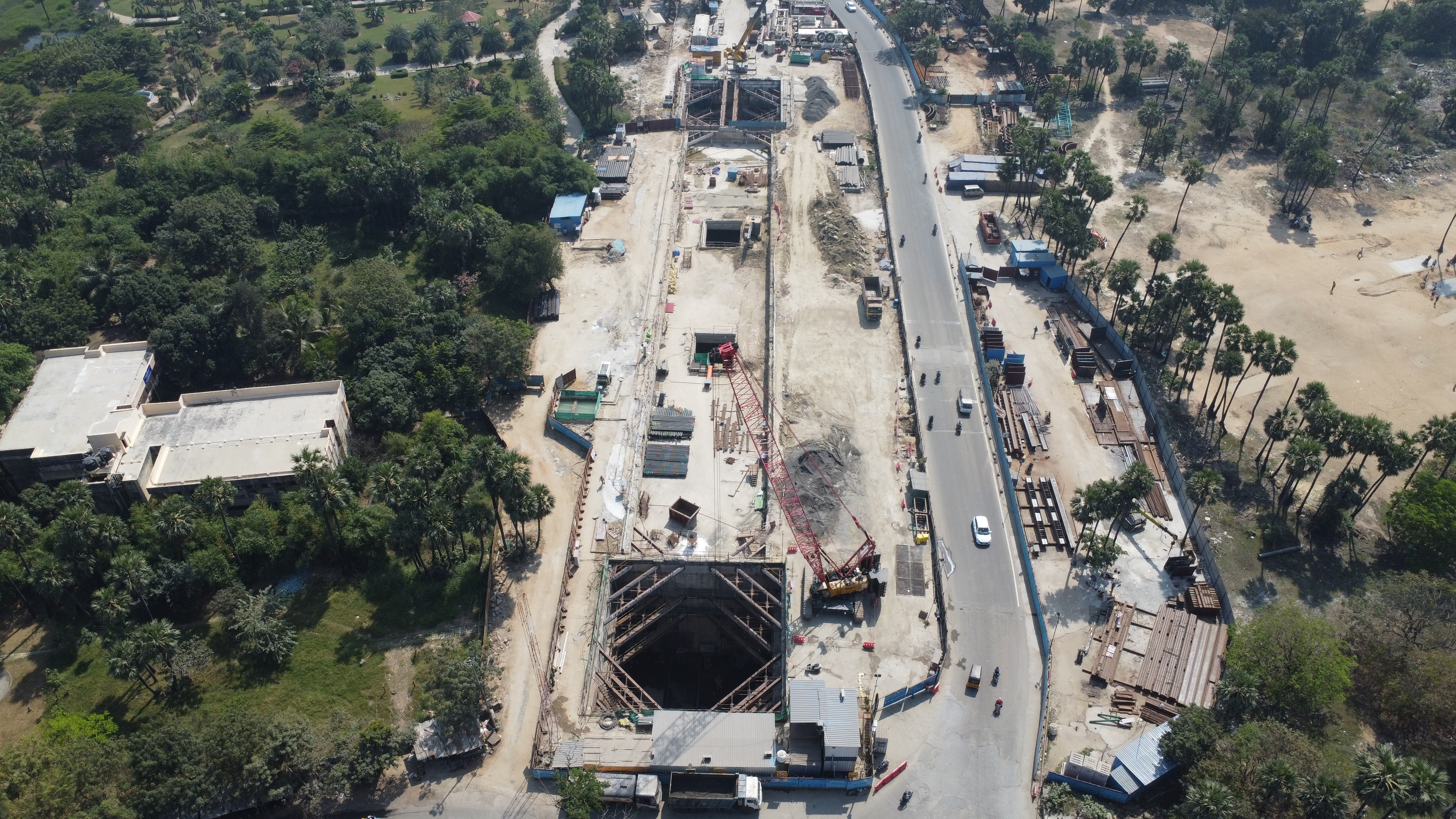
Construction of Madhavaram Milk Colony underground station as part of the Phase 2 in 2025

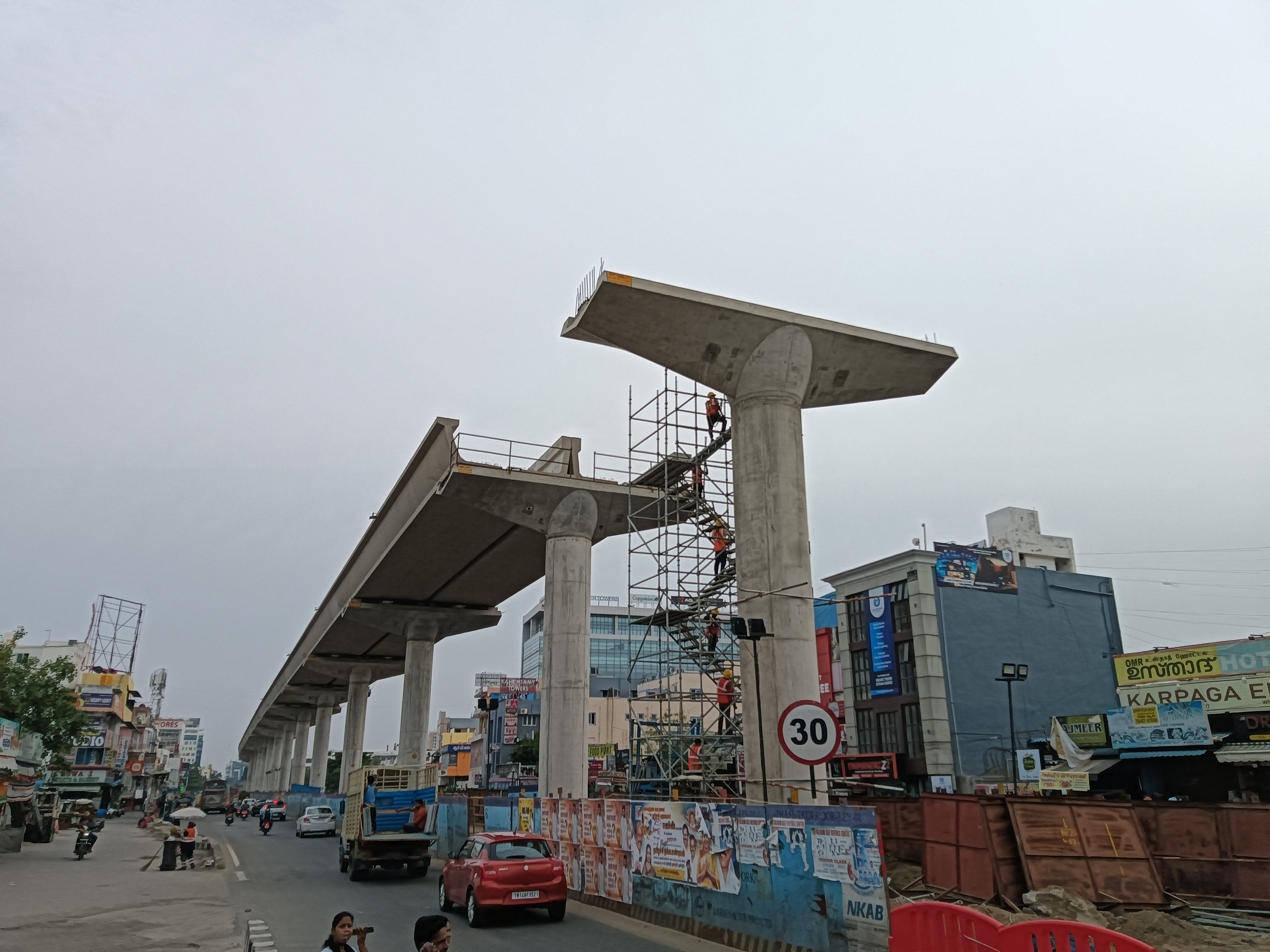
Construction of elevated section of Purple line along OMR as a part of Phase 2 in 2024

Prime Minister Narendra Modi along with Chief Minister of Tamil Nadu, Vijay inaugurating the Poonamallee-Vadapalani Stretch of Phase II of Chennai Metro Rail Project, on October 11, 2026.

Major contracts awarded during Phase 2 construction
Year	Scope of contract work	Contractor	Contract Value	Notes
May 2021	Civil construction of various sections of Phase 2	Tata Group, Larsen & Toubro (L&T), HCC-KEC	₹6,427.25 crore (US$690 million)	
November 2022	Rolling stock supply of 78 train sets including 36 driver-less trains	Alstom	₹798 crore (US$85 million)	
December 2022	Installation of tracks	KEC–Vijay Nirman Company JV	₹206.64 crore (US$22 million)	
December 2022	Installation of signalling systems	Hitachi	₹1,620 crore (US$170 million)	
January 2023	Construction of 12 underground stations in Purple Line	Rail Vikas Nigam Limited (RVNL)	₹4,049.2 crore (US$430 million)	
January 2023	Installation of electric traction systems	Linxon		
May 2023	Installation of overhead equipment and control and monitoring systems	Larsen & Toubro (L&T)	₹770 crore (US$82 million)	
October 2023	Construction of 5 underground stations of Red Line	Tata Projects	₹1,817.54 crore (US$190 million)	
December 2023	Installation of platform screen doors at 36 elevated stations	ST Engineering	₹159.97 crore (US$17 million)	
December 2023	Installation of automated fare collection systems	Shellinfo	₹42 crore (US$4.5 million)	
March 2024	Additional supply of 96 train sets	Alstom	₹1,538.34 crore (US$160 million)	

As of May 2024, about 20 km (12 mi) of the second phase had been completed. In March 2025, the first trial run on the Phase II network was conducted on a 3 km (1.9 mi) stretch between Poonamallee and Mullaithottam on the proposed Yellow Line. In April 2025, trial runs began on a 10 km (6.2 mi) stretch between Poonamallee and Porur Junction stations on the same line. The RDSO conducted inspection on the same stretch in August 2025, and the Railway Board provided approval for the operation of signals on the line in December 2025. Following the conclusion of safety checks by the CMRS in February 2026, the operations on Poonamallee Bypass to Vadapalani stretch on the Yellow Line commenced on 11 October 2026., with no intermediate stoppages between Porur and Vadapalani,

Phase 2
Line	Terminals		Length (km)	Stations	Status/Opening date
Yellow Line	Poonamallee Bypass	Vadapalani	14.64 km (9.10 mi)	11	11 October 2026
Yellow Line	Poonamallee Bypass	Vadapalani	14.64 km (9.10 mi)	6 (Note: Six stations between Porur Junction and Vadapalani is under construction and will open at a later date)	Under construction
Yellow Line	Vadapalani	Lighthouse	11.5 km (7.1 mi)	10	Under construction
Purple Line	Madhavaram Milk Colony	Siruseri SIPCOT II	45.8 km (28.5 mi)	48	Under construction
Red Line	Madhavaram Milk Colony	Sholinganallur	47 km (29 mi)	45	Under construction
Total			118.9 km (73.9 mi)	118 (Note: Madhavaram Milk Colony and Sholinganallur stations are counted once, as it is shared between Purple and Red Lines. Alwarthirunagar, Valasaravakkam, Karambakkam, Alapakkam stations are counted once as it is shared between Yellow line and Red line Thirumayilai station is counted only once as it is shared between Purple and Yellow lines)	

=== Phase 3 ===
In 2022, the state government proposed an extension plan spanning 93 km (58 mi) for the three under construction lines of the second phase. The proposal involved extension of Purple Line from Siruseri SIPCOT to Kilambakkam, Yellow Line from Poonamallee to Parandur and Red Line from Koyambedu to Avadi. The proposed extension of second phase lines from Siruseri to Kilambakkam, Poonamallee to Parandur, and Koyambedu to Avadi were projected to cost ₹54.58 billion (US$580 million), ₹107.12 billion (US$1.1 billion), and ₹67.36 billion (US$720 million) respectively. Between late 2023 and early 2024, feasibility reports submitted by the CMRL suggested dropping the proposed extension of the purple line due to economic viability and going ahead with the planned extensions of the other two lines, spanning 59.7 km (37.1 mi). In May 2024, the state government proposed a new 16 km (9.9 mi) extension from Madhavaram to Ennore, which was later changed as Assisi Nagar to Wimco Nagar extension in 2026.

In May 2024, the Government of Tamil Nadu approved both the extensions of the Red Line from Koyambedu to Pattabiram and Yellow Line from Poonamallee to Parandur at an estimated cost of ₹99.28 billion (US$1.1 billion) and ₹159.06 billion (US$1.7 billion) respectively, forwarding to Government of India for final approval. In July 2026, Chennai Metro planned to club Airport - Kilambakkam extension of Phase-I as well as above planned extensions with proposed Phase III network, with few more stretches planned to link northern suburbs of city based on feasibility reports. Koyambedu metro station is set for upgrade with Phase III connectivity (Koyambedu - Pattabiram) with Phase I and Phase II stations of Green Line and Red Line respectively. CMRL also plans extending Airport to Kilambakkam extension further south, till Chengalpattu.

Phase 3
Line	Terminals		Length	Stations	Status	Reference
Blue Line	Chennai Airport	Kilambakkam	15.46 km (9.61 mi)	12	DPR approved by state (awaiting Central govt approval)	
Red Line	Koyambedu	Pattabiram	21.76 km (13.52 mi)	19	DPR approved by state (awaiting Central govt approval)	
Yellow Line	Poonamallee	Sunguvarchatiram	27.9 km (17.3 mi)	14	DPR approved by state (awaiting Central govt approval)	
Other Planned lines (Note: These proposed corridors are separate and not yet formally classified under Phase-3)
Blue Line	Kilambakkam	Chengalpattu	25 km (16 mi)	TBC	DPR under preparation	
Red Line	Assisi Nagar	Wimco Nagar	11 km (6.8 mi)	TBC	DPR under preparation	
Yellow Line	Lighthouse	High Court	7 km (4.3 mi)	TBC	DPR yet to be prepared	
TBD	Tambaram	Velachery	21 km (13 mi)	TBC	DPR yet to be prepared	

=== Integration of MRTS ===
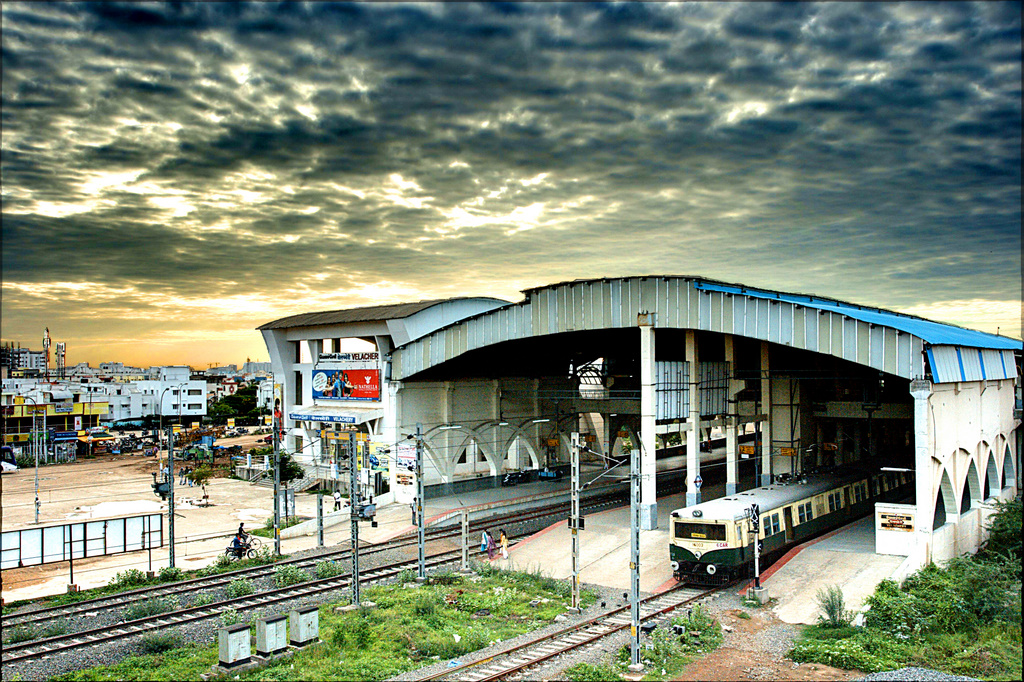
Chennai MRTS is proposed to be handed over to Chennai Metro

In 2017, the state government proposed to integrate the Chennai Mass Rapid Transit System (MRTS) into the Chennai Metro. In July 2018, PwC said that the merger would cost around ₹30 billion (US$320 million) to convert the rolling stock and install other facilities for the merger. On 11 May 2022, Southern Railway of the Indian Railways granted an in-principle approval for the integration of the MRTS into the metro. As per the plan, the railway would handover the MRTS to the CMRL once the expansion of the MRTS is completed. However, the extended second phase of the MRTS project, connecting Velachery with St. Thomas Mount experienced delays, and was completed in March 2026. Once the takeover is completed, CMRL will upgrade the MRTS system including tracks, security, ticketing system and rolling stock.

=== Metrolite ===
In 2020, a light rail was proposed to connect Tambaram railway station of the existing suburban rail network with Velachery on the MRTS, as part of plans to link the different urban transit lines in the city. Feasibility studies for the project was commissioned in February 2023 by the Chennai Unified Metropolitan Transport Authority (CUMTA). In March 2024, a study was commissioned to re-assess the feasibility of establishing a new corridor connecting Tambaram with Velachery with an extension to connect with existing Guindy metro station. In 2025, the government decided to develop the stretch as a regular metro corridor.

=== Others ===
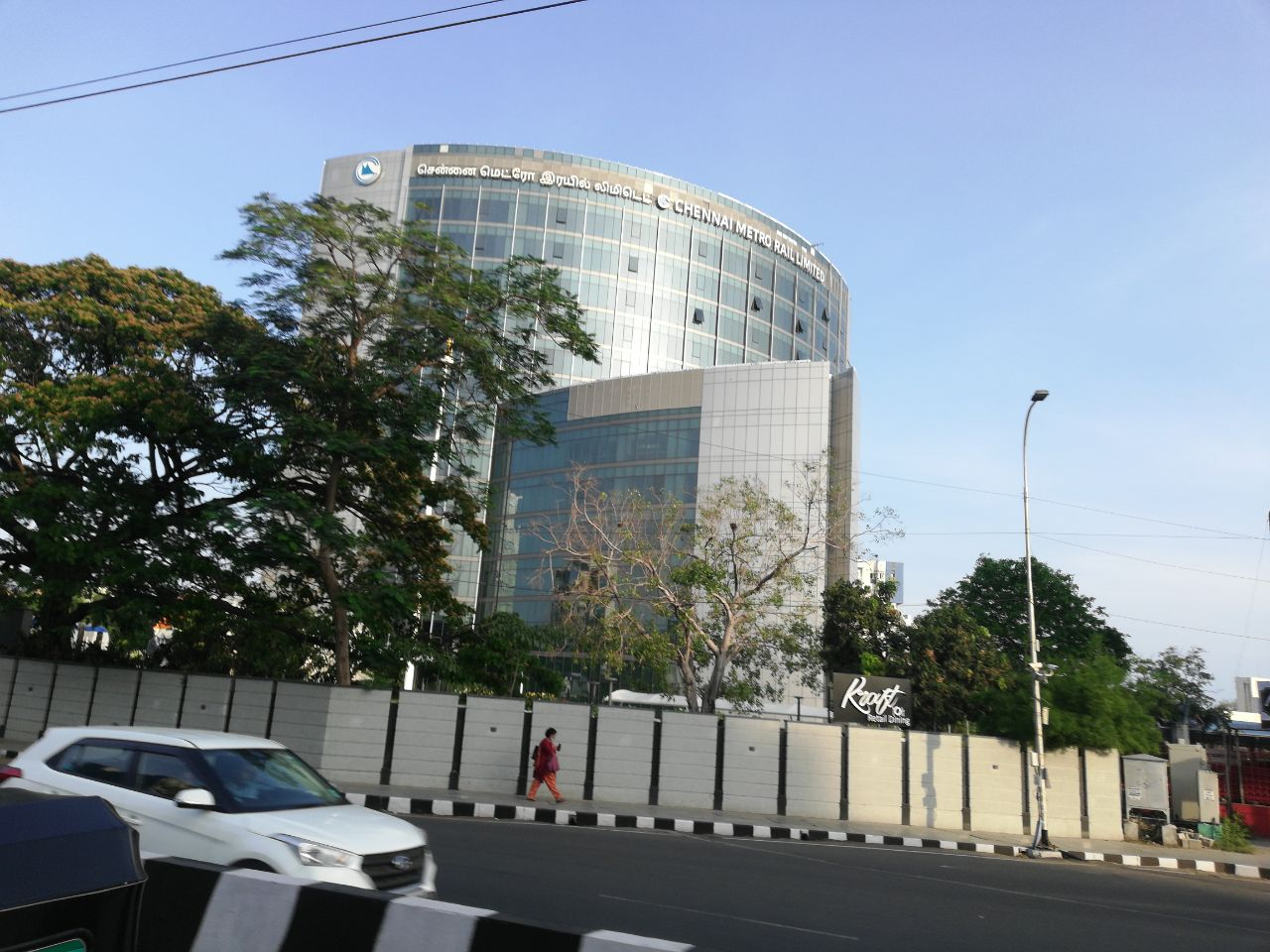
MetroS, the Chennai Metro headquarter building at Nandanam

The third phase of the Chennai Metro is under planning as a part of the Chennai Comprehensive Mobility Plan, with upgrades to existing Phase-I stations and procurement of 28 new six-coach metro trains. The CMRL is also involved in the feasibility studies for the development of metro rail transport in the cities of Coimbatore, Madurai and Tiruchirapalli.

CMRL developed the Kathipara Urban Square as a multi-modal transport hub with parking and recreational areas. In 2023, the CMRL proposed the development of Central Square around its headquarters with commercial complexes and multi-storied buildings. In April 2025, CMRL announced that it has identified public spaces in Adyar and Velachery which can be transformed into public spaces similar to Kathipara Urban Square.

== Lines ==
The Chennai Metro consists of five colour-coded lines developed under two phases. The Blue and Green lines form the Phase I network, while the Purple, Yellow and Red lines are part of the Phase II expansion. The three Phase II corridors have a combined planned length of 118.9 kilometres.

=== Blue Line ===
The Blue Line connects Wimco Nagar Depot with Chennai International Airport. It passes through areas including Washermanpet, Chennai Central, Government Estate, Thousand Lights, Teynampet, Saidapet, Guindy and Meenambakkam. The line comprises both elevated and underground sections and provides interchange with the Green Line at Chennai Central and Alandur.

=== Green Line ===
The Green Line extends approximately 22 kilometres from Chennai Central to St. Thomas Mount. The line passes through Egmore, Kilpauk, Anna Nagar, Koyambedu, Vadapalani, Ashok Nagar and Alandur. It includes elevated and underground sections and connects with the Blue Line at Chennai Central and Alandur.

=== Purple Line ===
The Purple Line is an under-construction line extending 45.8 kilometres from Madhavaram Milk Colony to Siruseri SIPCOT. The corridor is planned to have 50 stations, including 30 underground and 20 elevated stations. It passes through central Chennai and follows Old Mahabalipuram Road through Perungudi, Thoraipakkam and Sholinganallur, serving the city's southern information technology corridor.

=== Yellow Line ===
The Yellow Line extends 26.1 kilometres from Lighthouse to Poonamallee Bypass. The line is planned to have 30 stations, including 12 underground and 18 elevated stations. Its route passes through Mylapore, T. Nagar, Kodambakkam, Vadapalani and Porur. The underground section includes stations at Lighthouse, Alwarpet, Nandanam and Panagal Park, while the western section is elevated.

=== Red Line ===
The Red Line is an under-construction line planned to extend 47 kilometres from Madhavaram Milk Colony to Sholinganallur. It will comprise 48 stations, including 42 elevated and six underground stations. The corridor passes through northern and western Chennai before continuing towards the southern suburbs. It will connect with Corridor 3 at Sholinganallur, where a multi-level interchange station is being developed.

== Network ==
Chennai Metro operational network

Chennai Metro runs on 1,435 mm (4 ft 8 1/2 in) standard gauge and the lines are double-tracked. The trains can operate at a maximum speed of 120 km/h (75 mph), and the average operational speed is 85 km/h (53 mph).

As of October 2026, the operational network consists of three colour-coded lines covering a length of 68.8 km (42.8 mi).

Chennai Metro
Line	Terminals		First Operation	Last Extension	Length	Stations
Blue Line	Wimco Nagar Depot	Chennai Airport	21 September 2016	13 March 2022	32.1 km (19.9 mi)	26
Green Line	Central	St. Thomas Mount	29 June 2015	25 May 2018	22 km (14 mi)	17
Yellow Line	Poonamallee Bypass	Vadapalani	11 October 2026	11 October 2026	14.64 km (9.10 mi)	11 (Note: Six more stations under construction between Porur Junction and Vadapalani are currently skipped from stoppage and will be opened later)
Total					68.74 km (42.71 mi)	52 (Note: Two inter-change stations are shared by the lines)

== Infrastructure ==
=== Rolling stock ===
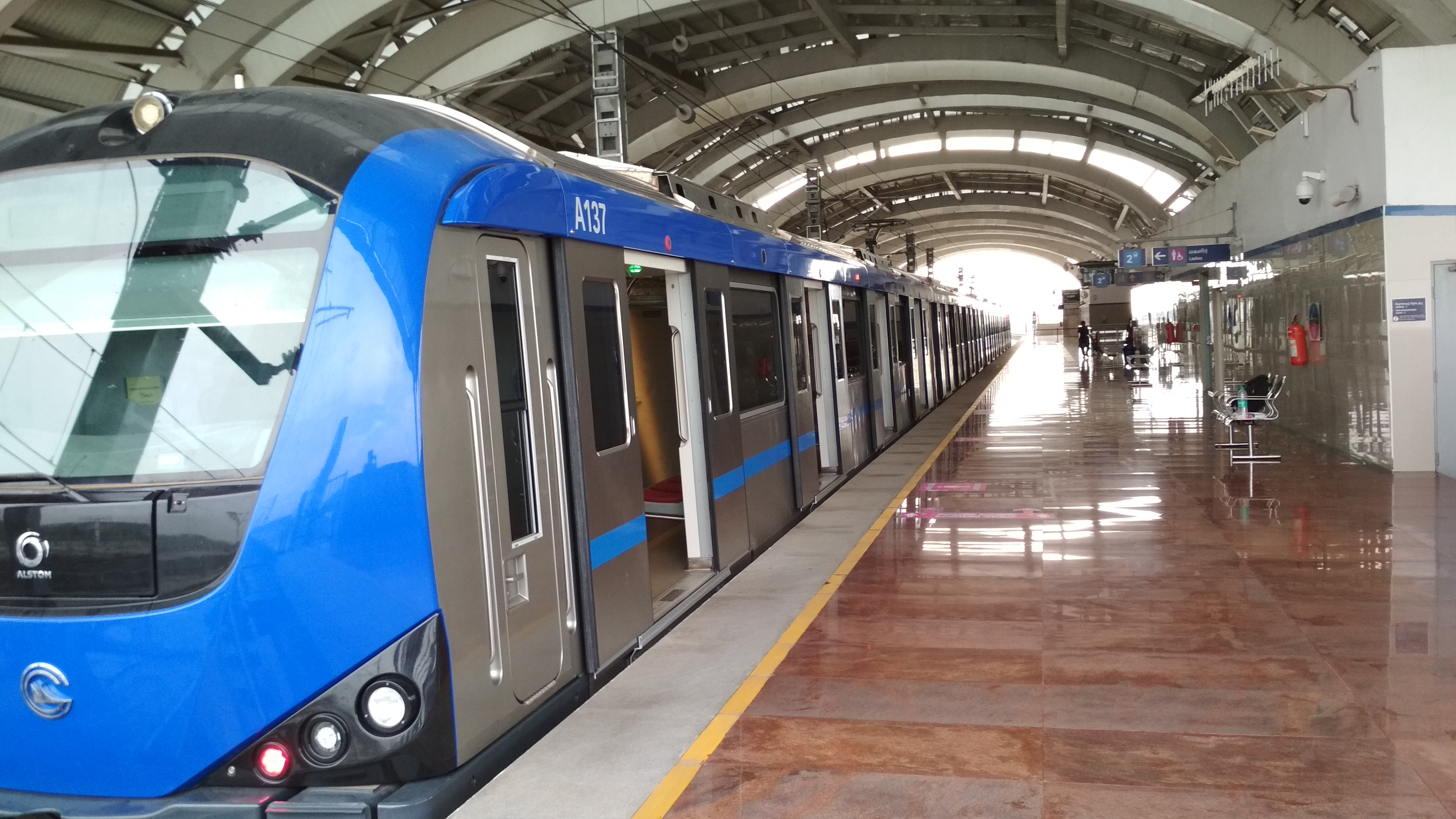
Chennai metro coaches are manufactured by Alstom

Alstom supplied the rolling stock for the first phase of the Chennai Metro. For the first phase, it supplied 42 train-sets composed of four coaches. The first nine train sets were imported from Brazil and the rest were manufactured at Alstom's facility at Sri City near Chennai. The trains are air-conditioned with electrically operated automated sliding doors. The trains usually have a first class compartment and a dedicated section reserved for women.

The trains operate on 25 kV AC electric traction. The trains are connected to the grid via overhead lines and are equipped with regenerative braking with a capacity to recover 30–35% of the energy during braking. The electricity is supplied by the Tamil Nadu Electricity Board, and the metro system consumed an average of 70 MW of power daily in 2014. Chennai Metro also uses solar power with an installed capacity of 6.4 MWp, which contributed to about 12-15% of the energy requirement of the metro in 2023.

For the second phase, Alstom was awarded a ₹9.47 billion (US$100 million) contract to supply 26 trainsets made of three coaches each to be deployed on the Yellow Line. In November 2024, CMRL awarded a ₹36.58 billion (US$390 million) contract to BEML for the supply of 70 trainsets, made of three coaches each, to be deployed on Red and Purple lines. In June 2025, CMRL placed an additional order of 32 driverless trainsets with Alstom.

=== Stations ===
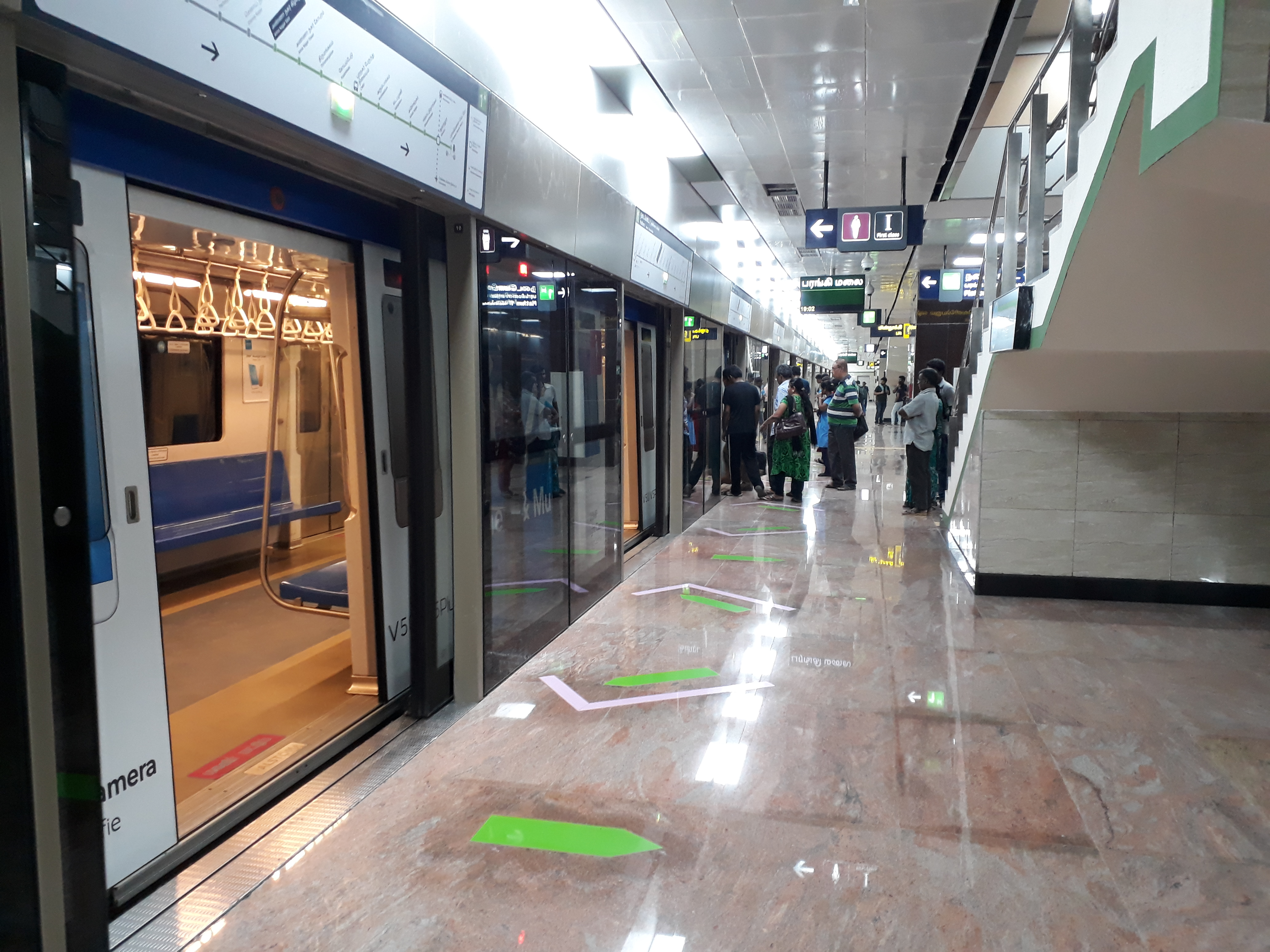
Full-height enclosed platform screen doors installed in the underground stations

A total of 40 stations, 22 of which are underground, are operational on the two lines of the first phase. In the underground sections, a walkway runs along the length of the corridor with cross passages every 250 m (820 ft) for the maintenance and emergency evacuation. The underground stations have an average width of 200 m (660 ft) and are located at an average depth of 6.1 m (20 ft) from the ground level. The average length of the stations in Phase 1 extension is about 180 m (590 ft).

The elevated stations have three levels with the concourse level at a minimum height of 5.5 m (18 ft) above the ground level and platform level above the concourse while the underground stations have two levels and are equipped with platform screen doors. The stations are air-conditioned and are equipped to be disabled and elderly friendly, with automated fare collection, public announcement system, electronic display boards, escalators and lifts. Paid parking facilities are available for two wheelers in most stations and four wheelers in select stations.

=== Depots ===
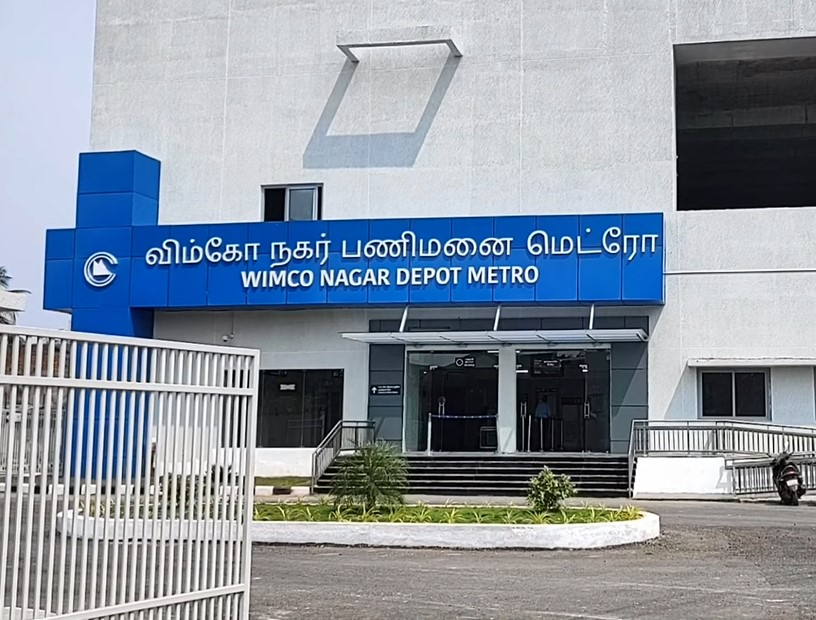
Wimco Nagar depot is situated adjacent to the Wimco Nagar Depot station

Chennai Metro maintains a major depot at Koyambedu which houses maintenance workshops, stabling lines, test tracks and a washing plant for the trains. In 2022, an elevated depot at Wimco Nagar commenced operations with the same facilities. Three new depots at Madhavaram, Poonamallee, and Semmencherry, are planned as a part of the second phase, of which Madhavaram depot is planned to be the largest. The Poonamallee depot was first in Phase II to commence operations with trial runs being conducted since 2024. In 2025, a sixth depot was planned at Pattabiram as a part of the Phase-III expansion of the Chennai Metro.

Operational Depots
Line name	Depot	Area (In Acres)	Cost
Green	Koyambedu	64	₹198 crore (US$21 million)
Blue	Wimco Nagar	8.64	₹230 crore (US$25 million)
Yellow	Poonamallee	40.5	₹225 crore (US$24 million)
Under Construction
Line name	Depot	Area (In Acres)	Cost
Red	Madhavaram	69	₹284.51 crore (US$30 million)
Purple	Madhavaram	69	₹284.51 crore (US$30 million)
Purple	Semmancherry	25	TBC
Proposed
Red	Pattabiram	TBC	TBC

== Operations ==
As of 2022, the metro operates trains from 5:00 am to 11:00 pm. The blue line has an average frequency of every 6 minutes during peak hours and every 12 minutes during off-peak hours. On the green line, the average frequency is 12 minutes during peak hours and 18 minutes during off-peak hours. The main operational control center (OCC) is located in Koyambedu where the movement of trains and real-time CCTV footage obtained is monitored. In 2022-23, the average daily ridership was 0.25 million.

=== Fare and ticketing ===
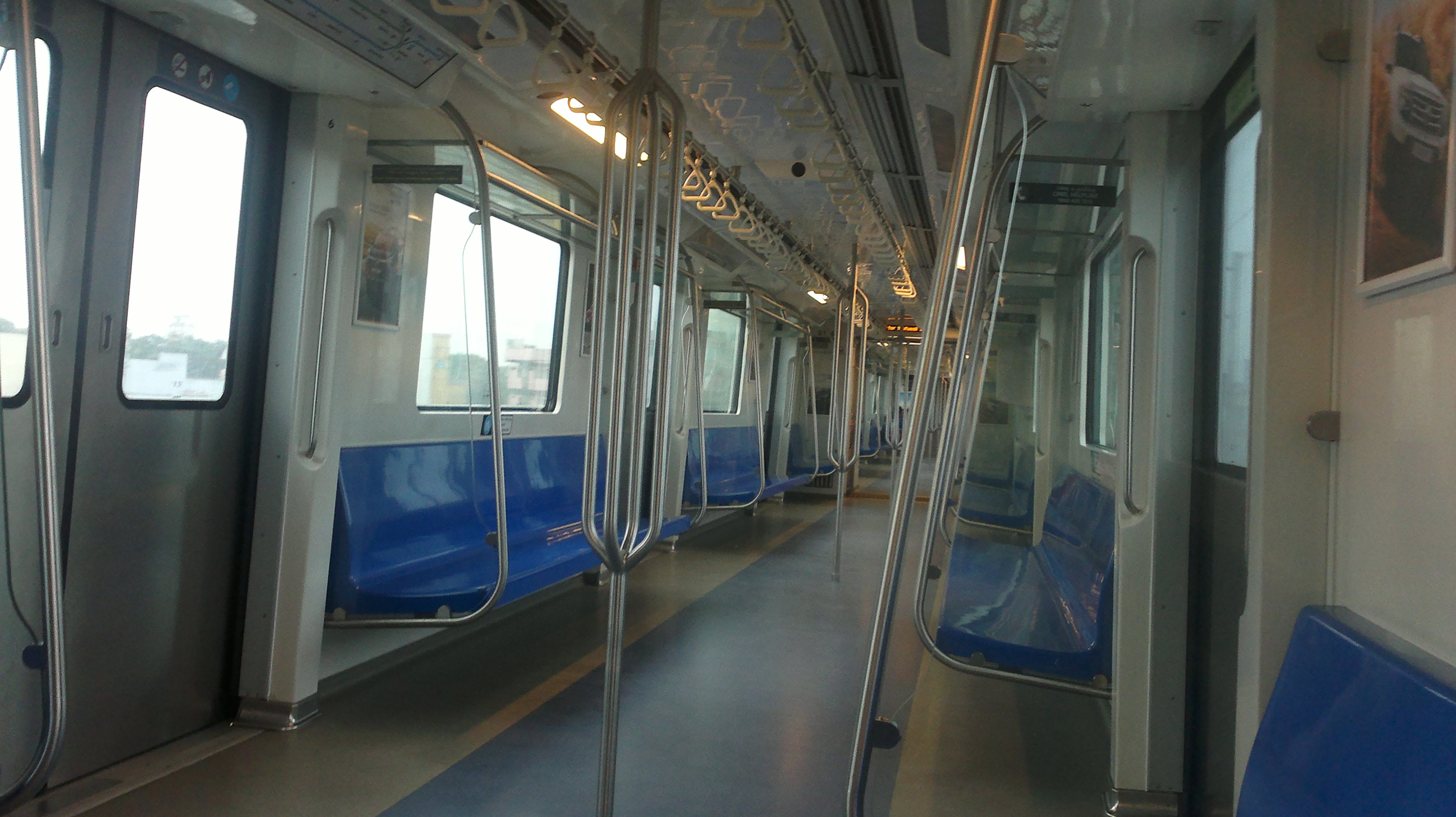
Interior of Chennai Metro coaches

The minimum fare is ₹10 and the maximum fare is ₹50.

There are six types of tickets issued by CMRL for travel in Chennai Metro.

- Single journey tokens, which need to be purchased each time for every journey at the ticket counter or in ticket vending machines available at all stations.
- Stored value cards (SVC) are pre-paid, rechargeable, travel cards that can be purchased at any ticket counter against a refundable deposit, can be recharged up to at any ticket counter or in automated ticket vending machines at stations and offers discounted fares. In April 2023, National Common Mobility Card replaced the Stored value cards
- Trip cards are for applicable for travel between the same two stations and are available in varied combinations and validity with discounted fares.
- Tourist cards provide the cardholders unlimited rides on the Chennai Metro system for one day.
- QR Tickets for single and return journey tickets can be bought through the CMRL mobile app with QR code ticket scanners at stations.
- National Common Mobility Card, also branded as Singara Chennai card, a stored-value cum debit card launched in 2023 in association with State Bank of India which can be used to access all major other metro and select bus transport systems in India.

== Incidents ==
- On 17 June 2015, a 30-year-old man was killed and another motorcyclist injured when an iron rod fell on them at a metro construction site near Officers Training Academy at St. Thomas Mount.
- On 27 September 2022, a crane used for transporting iron rods crashed near Ramapuram, causing the rods to fall on a Metropolitan Transport Corporation bus and injuring the bus driver, conductor, and crane operator.
- On the night of 13 June 2025, two girders of the under-construction Poonamallee–Porur Metro section collapsed in Manapakkam, killing a 43-year-old man. CMRL imposed a fine of ₹10 million (US$110,000) on the contractor Larsen & Toubro for the incident.
- On the early morning of 2 December 2025, a metro train on blue line struck underground between Central Metro station and High Court Metro station due to technical glitches owing to which the passengers onboard got stranded inside the underground tunnel and has been rescued themselves by walking through the inspection catwalk trial.

== See also ==
- Coimbatore Metro
- Madurai Metro
- Transport in Chennai
- Urban rail transit in India
