= Sholinganallur metro station =

Upcoming Chennai Metro's elevated interchange metro station

Sholinganallur

General information
- Coordinates: 12.90120°N 80.22794°E
- System: Chennai Metro station
- Owner: Chennai Metro Rail Limited (CMRL)
- Operator: Chennai Metro
- Line: Purple Line Red Line
- Platforms: Side Platform; Platform-1 → Madhavaram Milk Colony; Platform-2 → SIPCOT Siruseri Side platform Platform-1 → Madhavaram Milk Colony / Pattabiram; Platform-2 → Line terminates here
- Tracks: 4

Construction
- Structure type: Elevated, Double track
- Platform levels: 2
- Accessible: Yes

Other information
- Status: Under Construction

History
- Opening: December 2027; 13 months' time
- Electrified: Single phase 25 kV, 35 Hz AC through overhead catenary

Services
Preceding station	Chennai Metro	Following station
Okkiyam Thoraipakkam towards Madhavaram Milk Colony	Purple Line (Under Construction)	Sholinganallur Lake I towards SIPCOT Siruseri
Terminus	Red Line (Under Construction)	ELCOT towards Madhavaram Milk Colony
Terminus	Red Line (Future Service)	ELCOT towards Pattabiram
Route map
Location

Sholinganallur metro station is an upcoming elevated-interchange metro station on the Red Line and Purple Line of Chennai Metro in Chennai, India. This metro station will be among the 19 elevated stations of Corridor III and 39 elevated stations of Corridor V of the Chennai Metro. This station is slated to be operational by December 2027, making it a key metro rail hub of South Chennai.

== History ==
In 2022, Rail Vikas Nigam Limited (RVNL), was awarded the contract for construction of stations from Sholinganallur to SIPCOT II with Sholinganallur being key interchange station. The construction of this stretch faced delays and was finally started in mid of 2024.

== Station layout ==
Station Layout

G	Street level	Exit/Entrance
L1	Mezzanine	Fare control, station agent, Ticket/token, Public plaza
L2	Grade separator	Sholinganallur junction flyover
L3	Platform # Northbound	Towards → Madhavaram Milk Colony; Next Station: Okkiyam Thoraipakkam
L3	Side platform | Doors will open on the left
L3	Platform # Southbound	Towards ← SIPCOT Siruseri; Next Station: Sholinganallur Lake I
L4	Platform # Westbound	Towards → Madhavaram Milk Colony/ Pattabiram; Next Station: ELCOT
L4	Side platform | Doors will open on the right
L4	Platform # Eastbound	Train terminates here

== Design and Supportive Infrastructure ==
Sholinganallur metro station will be an elevated interchange station integrated with an eight-storey, 35-metre-tall building. The complex will include a plaza, parking and concourse facilities within the lower floors. Metro trains of Line 3 and Line 5 will operate on third and fourth levels. CMRL also plans to utilise sixth to eighth floor for office space or for retail outlets.

== Entry/Exit ==
The station will have 4 Entry/Exit points: On Perumbakkam Main Road, in the direction of Elcot Park and other on Kalaignar Karunanithi Salai, in the direction towards ECR.

== See also ==
- List of Chennai metro stations
- Railway stations in Chennai
- Transport in Chennai
- Urban rail transit in India
- List of metro systems
