= Koyambedu Wholesale Market Complex =

Perishable goods market complex in Chennai, India

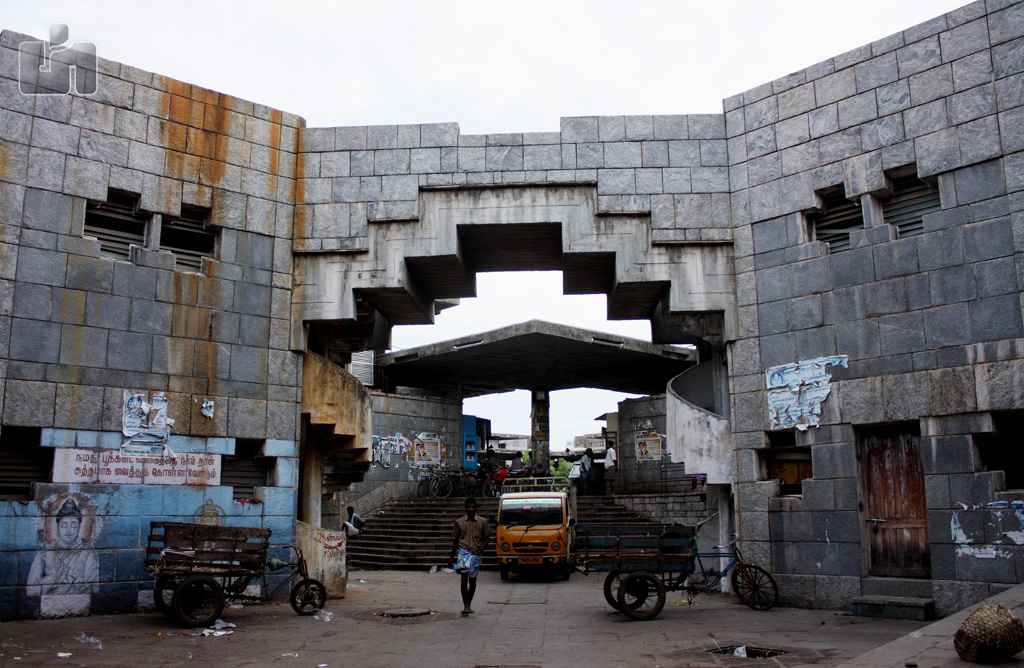
Entrance to the market

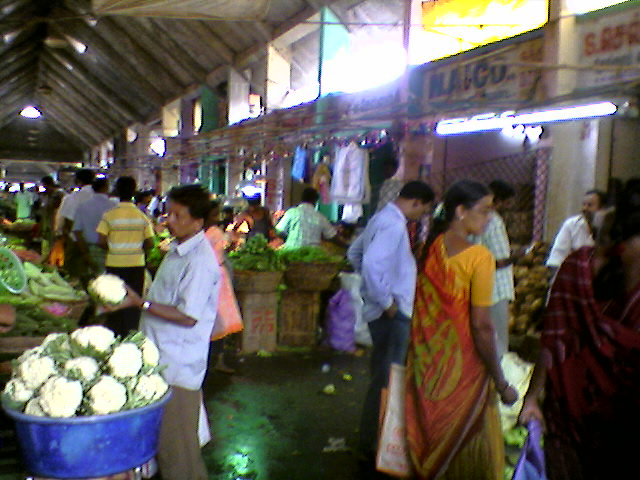
A view of the Koyambedu Market

Koyambedu Wholesale Market Complex (KWMC) is one of Asia's largest perishable goods market complex located at Koyambedu, Chennai. The market complex is spread over an area of 295 acres (1.19 km^{2}). Inaugurated in 1996, the complex consists of about 3,100 shops, including more than 1,000 wholesale shops and 2,000 retail shops. Of these, 850 are fruit shops. It abuts the Poonamallee High Road and Nesapakkam Road and can be easily accessed from all parts of City. In Phase I, a wholesale market for perishables was developed in an area of around 70 acres (280,000 m^{2}) by constructing 3,194 shops. The market has two blocks for vegetable shops and one each for fruit and flower shops. In Phase II, a textile market and in Phase III, a food grain market have been planned to be developed in the complex.

The food grain market will be built on a seven to eight acres of land belonging to the Chennai Metropolitan Development Authority, adjacent to the Koyambedu fire service station and opposite the vegetable market, and will have about 500 shops.

With the wholesale market operating between 10 p.m. and 10 a.m. and the retail market operating between 2 a.m. and 2 p.m., the market receives about 100,000 visitors and 500 to 600 vehicles every day.

== Developments ==
The Basic Infrastructure and Amenities Promotion Committee has approved an allocation of ₹ 336.3 million for augmentation and maintenance of the infrastructure, including stormwater drain network, in the market complex. The Market Management Committee will carry out the work which includes creation of new stormwater drains over 9 km long, widening of roads and concretisation of a 350-m road connecting Gates 7 and 14, which is being used by heavy vehicles to carry perishables to the market complex. The market has over 100,000 visitors daily. On an average, 1,500 lorries and other heavy vehicles come to the market every day, bringing in vegetables, fruits and flowers.

In 2012, the market was declared a green complex. As part of this, about 1,000 trees were planted on the market premises. The complex will also feature a landscape with a compound wall at a cost of ₹ 25 million, rainwater harvesting structures and solar lighting.

== Foodgrains market ==
An exclusive foodgrains market, the first such facility in the state, is under construction at the market complex at a cost of ₹ 690.7 million. It is being constructed in an area of 14.41 acres next to the existing wholesale vegetable market, with provision of godowns, parking space for trucks, public toilets, cement concrete roads, solar street lights, fire-fighting system, and water supply. It is expected to be opened by mid-2014. It will have about 500 shops for wholesale business of food grains, except sugar, jaggery, dry chillies, tamarind, and edible oil items.

== Bio-methanation plant ==
A bio-methanation plant at the market complex set by Chennai Metropolitan Development Authority (CMDA) was inaugurated in 2006 at a cost of ₹ 55 million to generate power from vegetable and fruit waste collected from the wholesale market. The Biomethanation plant has a capacity to produce 2500 unit per day with 30 tons of Waste. The plant was operated by the Koyambedu Market Management Committee till 2008 and was put to disuse owing to machine repair. The plant was operational again from April 2011 but only for four months and is awaiting Tamil Nadu Power Distribution Corporation Limited's approval to supply electricity to the grid. The plant has the capacity to convert 30 tonnes of waste per day into 2,500 units daily. Of the nearly 150 tonnes of vegetable and fruit waste generated daily at the market, about 30 tonnes are segregated. A total of 1.75 acre has been allotted for composting 50 tonnes of waste. There are also plants to recycle banana stems.

== Parking ==
The market complex has a 7.46-acre open-space parking lot adjacent to the biomethanation plant, opened by the CMDA on 5 April 2013. It has a provision to park 400 heavy vehicles at any given point of time.

== Transportation ==
The market is located adjacent to the Chennai Mofussil Bus Terminus and the CMBT and Koyambedu metro stations of the Chennai Metro and is thus well connected by both bus and rail transportation.

=== Railway ===
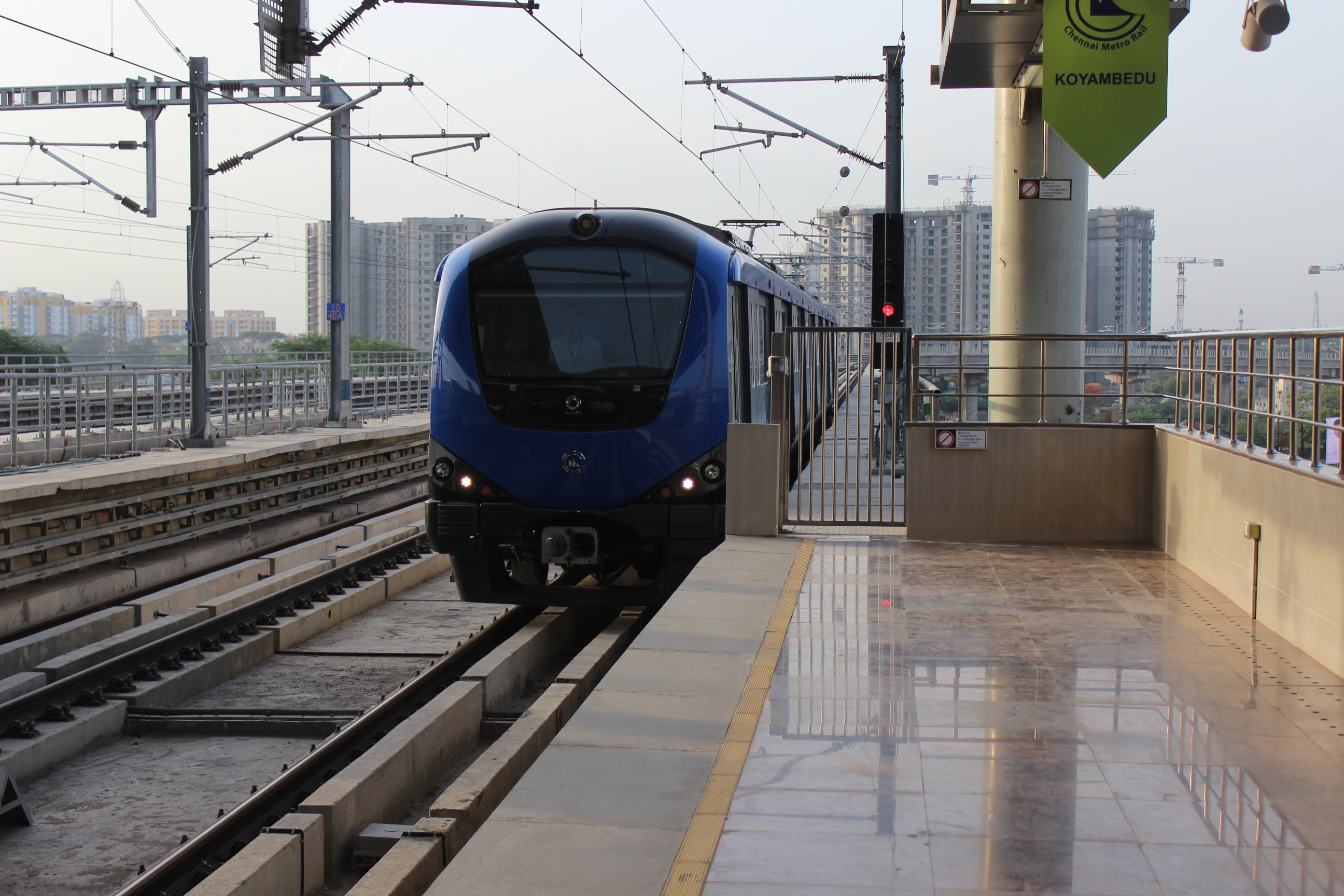
Chennai Metro Rail at Koyambedu

Koyambedu Metro station is a Metro railway station on Line 2 of the Chennai Metro, which is one terminal of the current open metro line from Alandur. The station is among the elevated stations coming up along corridor II of the Chennai Metro, Chennai Central–St. Thomas Mount stretch. The station will serve the neighbourhoods of Koyambedu, Koyambedu vegetable market, and Koyambedu Private Bus Terminus. The station was constructed by Consolidated Construction Consortium Limited (CCCL), and attained its structural completion in December 2012. The consolidated cost of the station along with the stations of Arumbakkam, CMBT, Vadapalani and Ashok Nagar was ₹ 1,395.4 million.

The station is an elevated station near Koyambedu vegetable market. The station has a capacity to handle about 23,000 passengers an hour. Elevation of the platforms will be about 15 m from the ground level and the total length of the platforms will be 140 m. Along with Chennai Central and Alandur stations, the station will have a 230-kV receiving sub-station for power supply from the state's electricity grid. The sub-station will supply 25-kV of electricity to the trains and 33-kV to the stations.

Along with Ashok Nagar and Vadapalani Metro stations, Koyambedu Metro station will be developed by leasing out space either for shops or office spaces. As part of fire safety measures, underground water tanks of 50,000 to 100,000 litre capacity will be set up at the station.

The station lies within 1 km from the Koyambedu Junction. The highways department has proposed a 1-km flyover that passes through Jawaharlal Nehru Road–Kaliamman Koil Street Junction. A skywalk has also been planned near the station across the Poonamallee High Road. The skywalk will link Rohini theatre with the Koyambedu Metro station.

== COVID-19 Epicenter ==
During the 2020 pandemic, Koyambedu Market became the epicenter of largest cluster of the novel coronavirus disease (COVID-19) in Tamil Nadu.

== See also ==
- Kothawal Chavadi
- Chennai Mofussil Bus Terminus
