= Arumbakkam metro station =

Chennai Metro's Green Line metro station

Arumbakkam

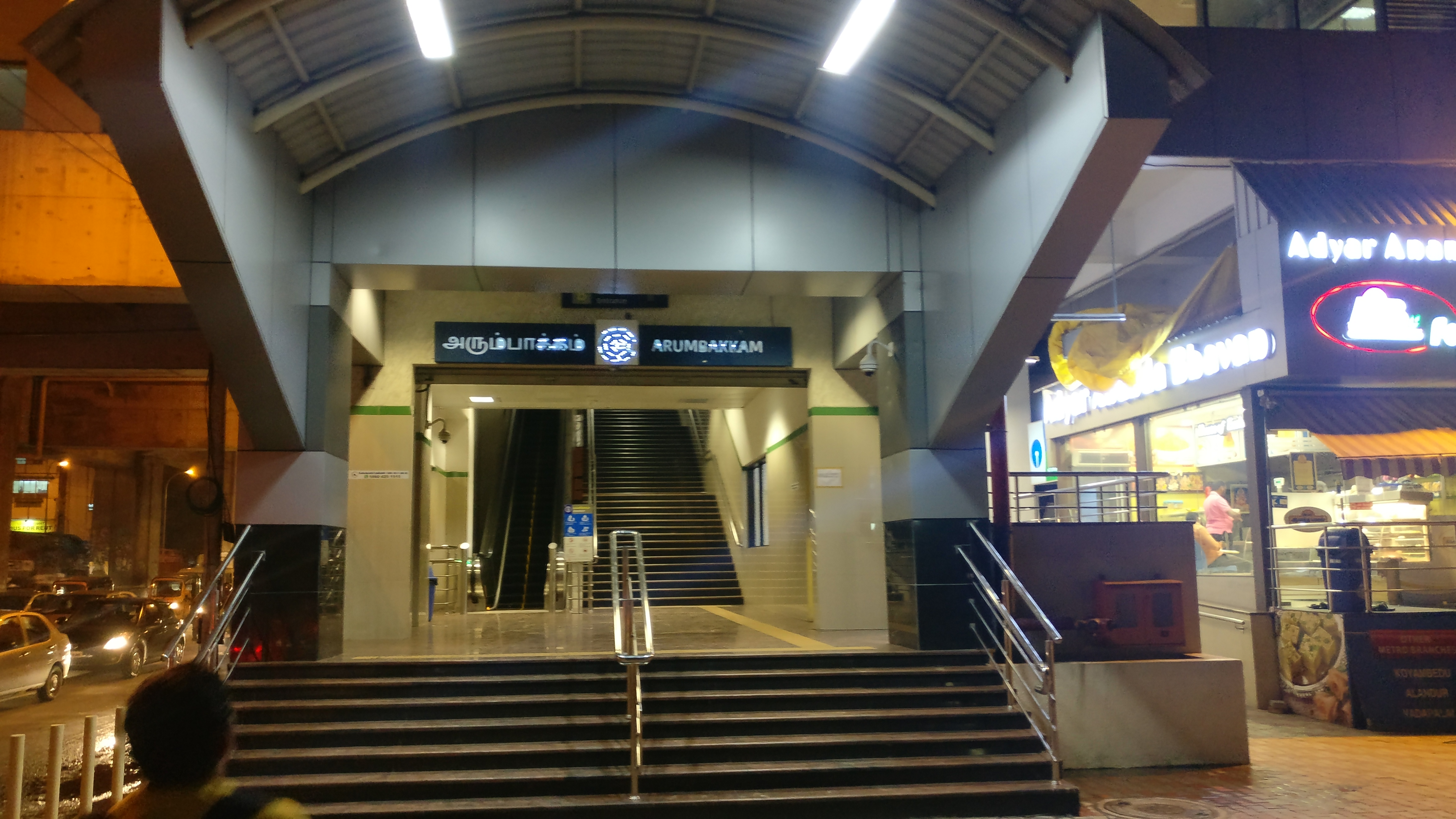
- Arumbakkam metro station

General information
- Location: Jawaharlal Nehru Rd, Vinayagapuram, Arumbakkam, Chennai, Tamil Nadu 600106
- Coordinates: 13°3′44″N 80°12′42″E
- System: Chennai Metro station
- Owner: Chennai Metro
- Operator: Chennai Metro Rail Limited (CMRL)
- Line: Green Line Inter Corridor Line
- Platforms: Side platform Platform-1 → St. Thomas Mount; Platform-2 → M.G.R Chennai Central
- Tracks: 2

Construction
- Structure type: Elevated, Double Track
- Platform levels: 2
- Parking: Available
- Cycle facilities: Free Bicycle Available
- Accessible: Yes

Other information
- Station code: SAR

History
- Opened: June 29, 2015; 11 years ago
- Electrified: Single-phase 25 kV 50 Hz AC overhead catenary

Services
Preceding station	Chennai Metro	Following station
CMBT towards Chennai Central	Green Line	Vadapalani towards St. Thomas Mount
CMBT towards Chennai Central	Blue Line (Inter-Corridor Service)	Vadapalani towards Kilambakkam
Route map
Location

Arumbakkam is an elevated metro station on the South-East Corridor of the Green Line of Chennai Metro in Chennai, India. This station will serve the neighbourhoods of Vinayagapuram, Choolaimedu and MMDA Colony.

== Construction history ==
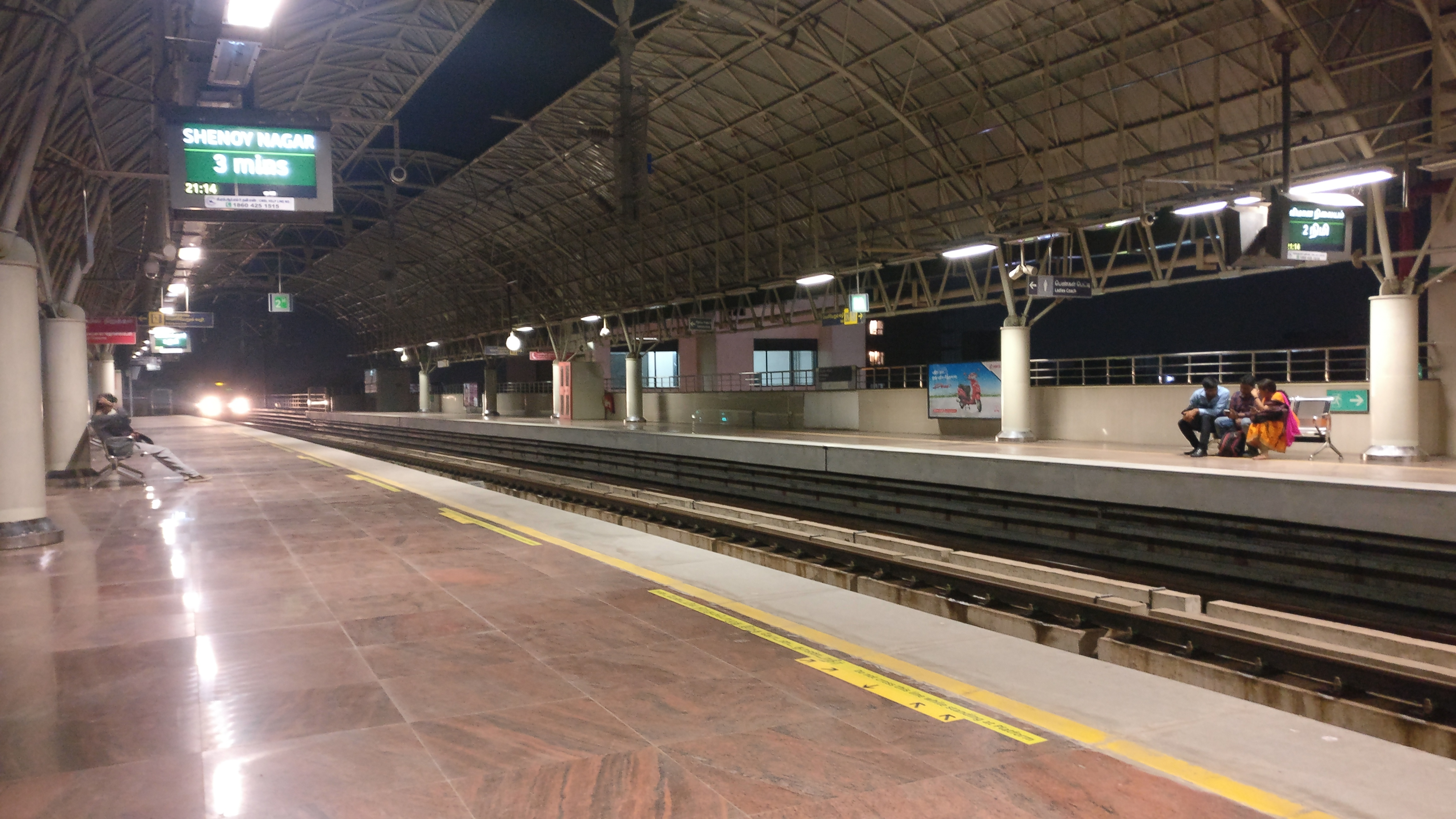
A view of the platforms inside the station

The station was constructed by Consolidated Constructed Consortium (CCCL). The station attained structural completion in September 2013. The consolidated cost of the station along with the stations of Koyambedu, CMBT, Vadapalani and Ashok Nagar was ₹ 1,395.4 million.

== The station ==
The station is being constructed as an elevated station on the arterial Inner Ring Road. The station will have ground, concourse and platform levels. The station will have four entry and exit points, four lifts and eight escalators; there will also be a ramp to facilitate the movement of disabled people from the ground level to the concourse level. Elevation of the platforms will be about 15 m from the ground level and the total length of the platforms will be 140 m.

=== Station layout ===
G	Street Level	Exit/Entrance
L1	Mezzanine	Fare control, station agent, Metro Card vending machines, crossover
L2	Side platform | Doors will open on the left
L2	Platform 2 Northbound	Towards → Chennai Central; Next Station: Puratchi Thalaivi Dr. J.Jayalalithaa CMBT
L2	Platform 1 Southbound	Towards ← St. Thomas Mount; Next Station: Vadapalani
L2	Side platform | Doors will open on the left
L2

=== Facilities ===
- Elevator
- Ticket booking Machines
- Refreshmentaries
- Atm

== Commercial hub ==
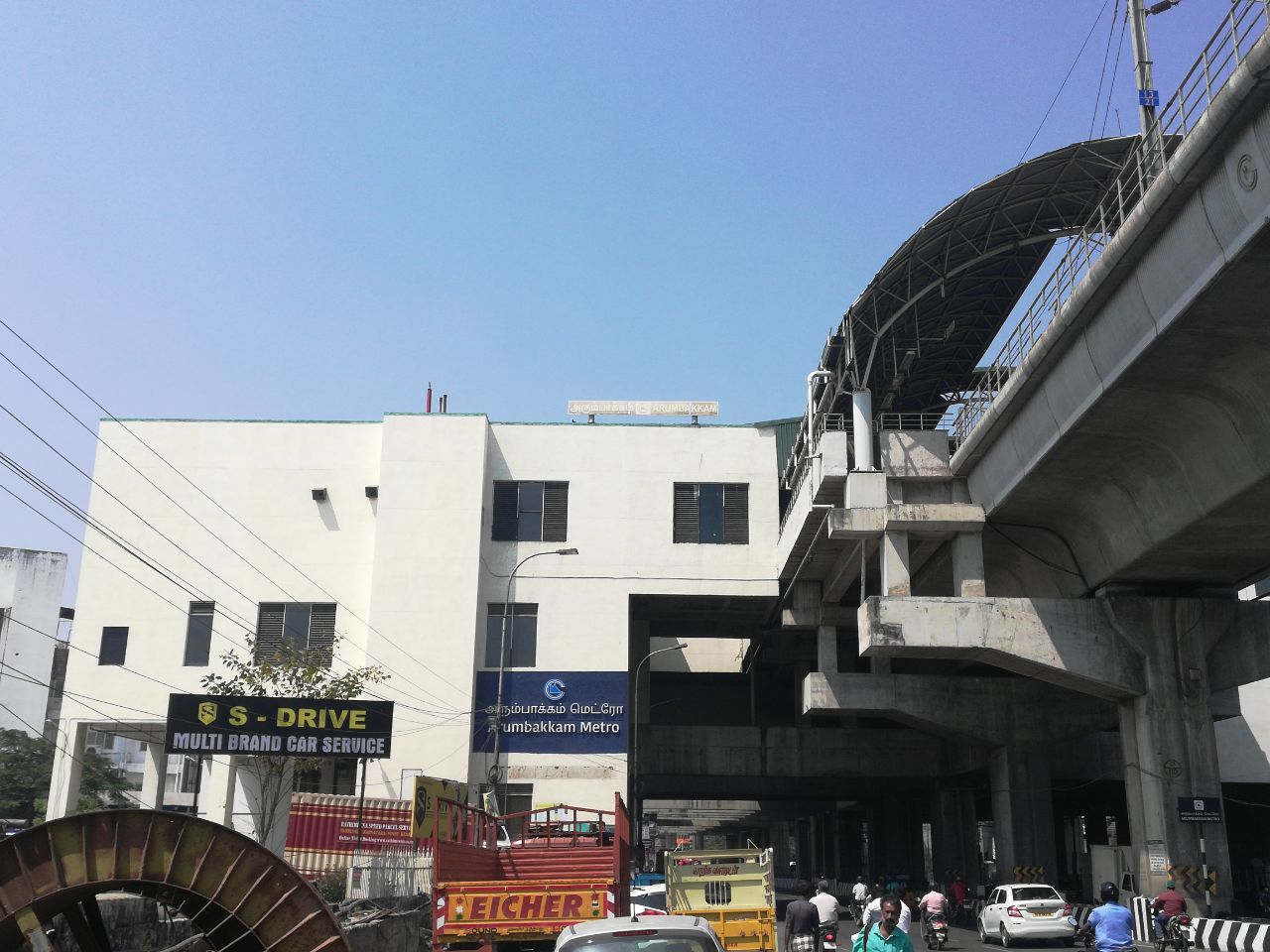
Entrance of the Arumbakkam Metro Station

Arumbakkam station is one of the five stations in the first phase of the Chennai Metro project identified to be converted into commercial hubs, the others being CMBT, Alandur, Ekkattuthangal, and Ashok Nagar. Two nine-floor buildings, measuring 51,379 sq ft and 32,721 sq ft, are proposed to be built at the Arumbakkam station.

== See also ==
- List of Chennai metro stations
- Chennai Metro
- Railway stations in Chennai
- Chennai Mass Rapid Transit System
- Chennai Monorail
- Chennai Suburban Railway
- Transport in Chennai
- List of metro systems in India
- List of rapid transit systems in India
- List of metro systems
