= Thirumangalam metro station =

Chennai Metro's Green Line metro station

Thirumangalam

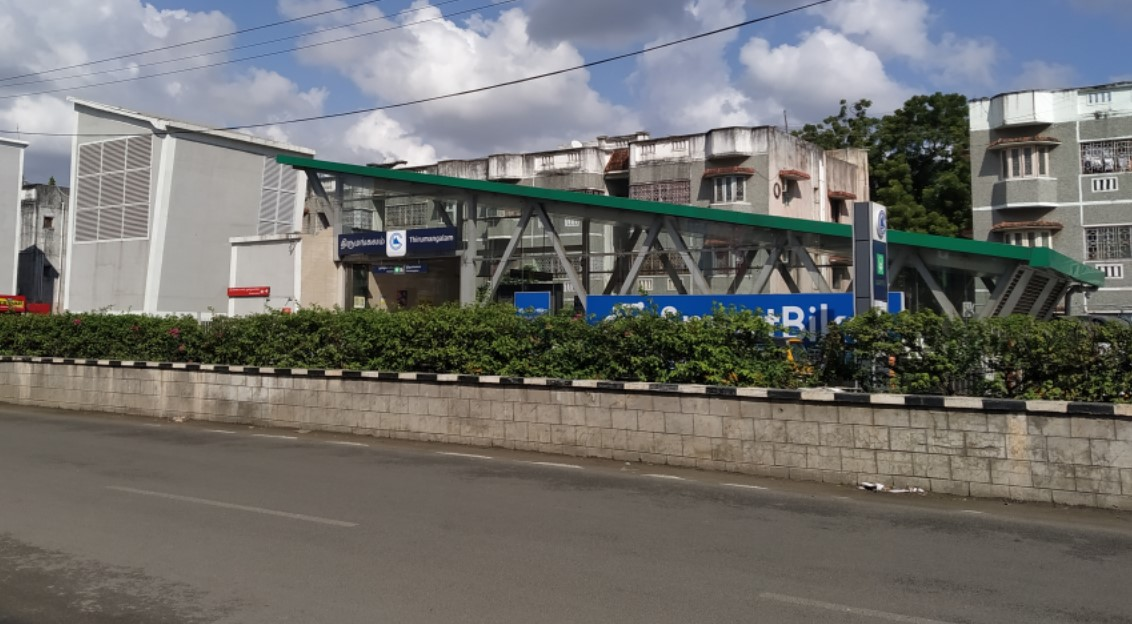

General information
- Location: L Block, Anna Nagar West, Chennai, Tamil Nadu 600040
- Coordinates: 13.085479°N 80.200981°E
- System: Chennai Metro station
- Owner: Chennai Metro
- Operator: Chennai Metro Rail Limited (CMRL)
- Line: Green Line Red Line Inter Corridor Line
- Platforms: Island platform (Underground); Platform-1 → St. Thomas Mount; Platform-2 → M.G.R Chennai Central (Elevated); Platform 1 → Sholinganallur; Platform 2 → Madhavaram Milk Colony
- Tracks: 2

Construction
- Structure type: Underground, Double track
- Accessible: Yes

Other information
- Station code: STI

History
- Opening: May 14, 2017; 9 years ago
- Electrified: Single-phase 25 kV 50 Hz AC overhead catenary

Passengers
- 2019: 10,000
- Rank: 1

Services
Preceding station	Chennai Metro	Following station
Anna Nagar East towards Chennai Central	Green Line	Koyambedu towards St. Thomas Mount
Anna Nagar East towards Chennai Central	Blue Line (Inter-Corridor Service)	Koyambedu towards Kilambakkam
Anna Nagar West towards Madhavaram Milk Colony or Pattabiram	Red Line (Under Construction)	Anna Nagar KV towards Sholinganallur
Route map
Location

Thirumangalam is an underground metro station on the South-East Corridor of the Green Line of Chennai Metro in Chennai, India. This station will serve the neighbourhoods where the old village of Thirumangalam once stood and now the area where the Thirumangalam Flyover, a prominent landmark and referred to by residents when giving directions.

== Construction history ==
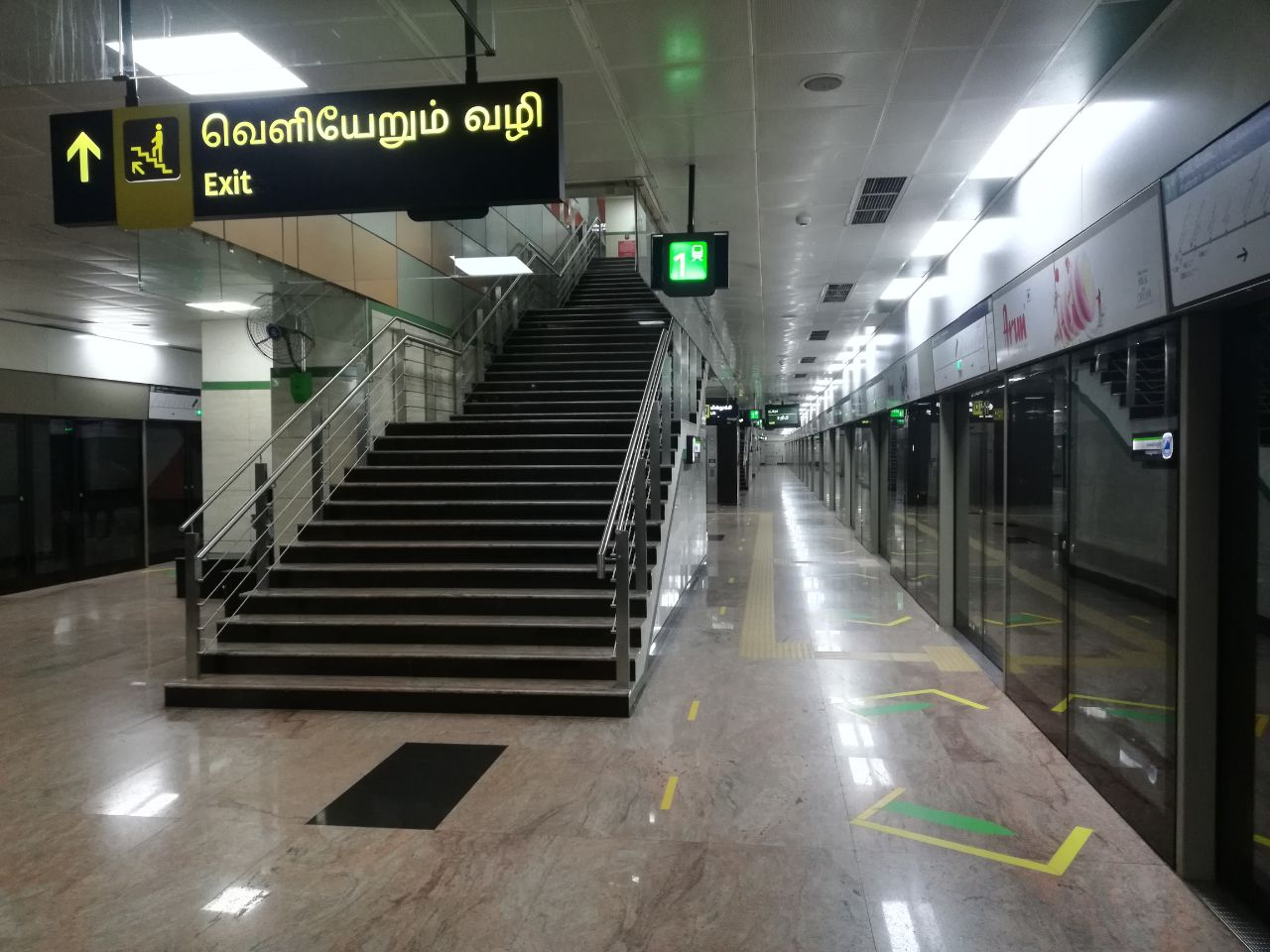
Tirumangalam Metro Station Chennai

The station is being constructed by the Consolidated Constructed Consortium (CCCL). The station was opened for public on May 14, 2017.

== The station ==
The station is being constructed as an underground station near Koyambedu. The station has a capacity to handle about 23,000 passengers an hour. The station has four entry and exit points.

=== Traffic ===
As of December 2019, about 10,000 passengers board trains at the station, making it the busiest metro station in Chennai.

=== Underground Station layout ===
G	Street level	Exit/Entrance
M	Mezzanine	Fare control, station agent, Ticket/token, shops
P	Platform 2 Northbound	Towards → Chennai Central; Next Station: Anna Nagar Tower
P	Island platform | Doors will open on the right
P	Platform 1 Southbound	Towards ← St. Thomas Mount; Next Station: Koyambedu

=== Elevated Station layout ===
G	Street level	Exit/Entrance
M	Mezzanine	Fare control, station agent, Ticket/token, shops
P	Platform 1 Southbound	Towards → Sholinganallur; Next Station: Kendriya Vidyalaya
P	Island platform | Doors will open on the right
P	Platform 2 Northbound	Towards ← Madhavaram Depot; Next Station: Anna Nagar

=== Facilities ===
List of available ATM at Thirumangalam metro station are

== Connections ==
Metropolitan Transport Corporation (Chennai) bus routes number 7E, 7F, 7H, 7K, 7M, 7MET, 15C, 34, 40A, 40H, 40L, 40N, 41D, 47C, 47CX, 47D, 47J, 147A, 147B, 147C, 147V, A47 serve the station. Also Share Autos serve the station.

On 30 June 2023, a Minibus Service S70k was launched which will connect Thirumangalam Metro Station to Korattur Water Canal Road via Anna Nagar West Depot, Padi Saravana Stores, Korattur Bus Stand, Bus Railway Station. also, 10 Electric Autorickshaws are available for a fixed price of Rs.25 per km.

== Entry/Exit ==
There are four entry exits. All are on second Avenue. The exits in the left side while traveling towards airport or Koyambedu is best suited for reaching Tirumangalam, Mogappair, Padi, Koyambedu. Additionally, Lalitha and GRT jewellers are in the same side.

== See also ==
- List of Chennai metro stations
- Chennai Metro
- Railway stations in Chennai
- Chennai Mass Rapid Transit System
- Chennai Monorail
- Chennai Suburban Railway
- Transport in Chennai
- List of metro systems in India
- List of rapid transit systems in India
- List of metro systems
