= Nehru Park metro station =

Chennai Metro's Green Line metro station

Nehru Park

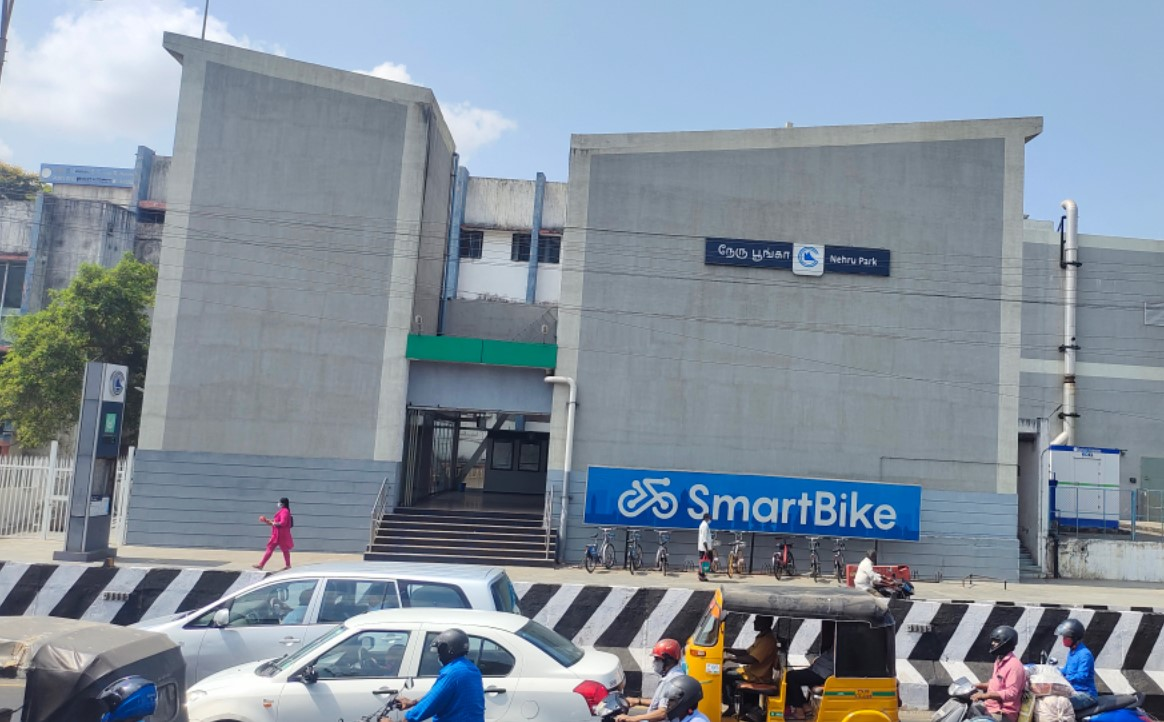

General information
- Location: Sastri Nagar, Chetpet, Chennai, Tamil Nadu 600031
- Coordinates: 13°04′44″N 80°15′00″E
- System: Chennai Metro station
- Owner: Chennai Metro
- Operator: Chennai Metro Rail Limited (CMRL)
- Line: Green Line Inter Corridor Line
- Platforms: Island platform Platform-1 → St. Thomas Mount; Platform-2 → M.G.R Chennai Central
- Tracks: 2

Construction
- Structure type: Underground, Double Track
- Depth: 18 metres (59 ft)
- Parking: Available
- Cycle facilities: Free bicycle
- Accessible: Yes
- Architectural style: Chennai Metro

Other information
- Station code: SNP

History
- Opened: 15 May 2017; 9 years ago
- Electrified: Single-phase 25 kV 50 Hz AC overhead catenary

Services
Preceding station	Chennai Metro	Following station
Egmore towards Chennai Central	Green Line	Kilpauk Medical College towards St. Thomas Mount
Egmore towards Chennai Central	Blue Line (Inter-Corridor Service)	Kilpauk Medical College towards Kilambakkam
Route map
Location

Nehru Park is an underground metro station on the South-East Corridor of the Green Line of Chennai Metro in Chennai, India. This was inaugurated on 14 May 2017. The station will serve the neighbourhoods of Egmore and Purasawalkam. The station has four entry and exit points.

== Station layout ==
G	Street level	Exit/Entrance
M	Mezzanine	Fare control, station agent, Ticket/token, shops
P	Platform 2 Northbound	Towards → Chennai Central; Next Station: Chennai Egmore
P	Island platform | Doors will open on the right
P	Platform 1 Southbound	Towards ← St. Thomas Mount; Next Station: Kilpauk Medical College

Nehru Park metro station
- Interactive map of the Nehru Park metro station area

General information
- Status: Completed
- Type: Metro station
- Location: Chetpet, Chennai, India
- Construction started: 2011
- Completed: 2017
- Opened: 15 May 2017
- Inaugurated: 14 May 2017

Design and construction
- Main contractor: L&T-SUCG JV

Other information
- Parking: available

Website
- http://chennaimetrorail.org/

=== Facilities ===
List of available ATM at Nehru Park metro station are

== Connections ==
=== Rail ===
Chetput railway station

== Entry/Exit ==
Nehru Park metro station Entry/exits
Gate No-A1	Gate No-A2	Gate No-A3	Gate No-A4

== See also ==
- Chennai
- Chetput (Chennai)
- Chetput Lake
- List of Chennai metro stations
- Chennai Metro
- Railway stations in Chennai
- Chennai Mass Rapid Transit System
- Chennai Monorail
- Chennai Suburban Railway
- Chetput railway station
- Transport in Chennai
- Urban rail transit in India
- List of metro systems
