= Kilpauk Medical College metro station =

Chennai Metro's Green Line metro station

Kilpauk Medical College

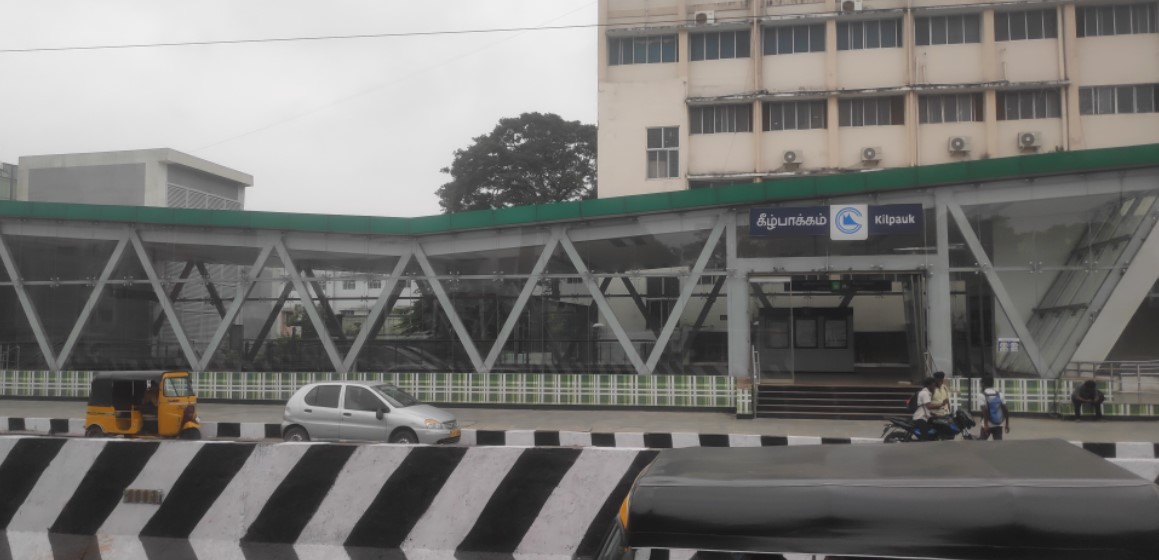

General information
- Location: New Bupathy Nagar, Chetpet, Chennai, Tamil Nadu 600031
- Coordinates: 13°04′39″N 80°14′34″E
- System: Chennai Metro station
- Owner: Chennai Metro
- Operator: Chennai Metro Rail Limited (CMRL)
- Line: Green Line Purple Line Inter Corridor Line
- Platforms: Island platform Platform-1 → St. Thomas Mount, Kilambakkam; Platform-2 → M.G.R Chennai Central; Platform-3 → SIPCOT 2 Platform 4 → Madhavaram Milk Colony
- Tracks: 4

Construction
- Structure type: Underground, Double Track
- Depth: 18 metres (59 ft)
- Parking: Available
- Cycle facilities: Free bicycle
- Accessible: Yes

Other information
- Station code: SKM

History
- Opened: 15 May 2017; 9 years ago
- Electrified: Single-phase 25 kV 50 Hz AC overhead catenary

Services
Preceding station	Chennai Metro	Following station
Nehru Park towards Chennai Central	Green Line	Pachaiyappa's College towards St. Thomas Mount
Nehru Park towards Chennai Central	Blue Line (Inter-Corridor Service)	Pachaiyappa's College towards Kilambakkam
Kellys towards Madhavaram Milk Colony	Purple Line (Future Service)	Chetpet towards SIPCOT 2
Route map
Location

Kilpauk Medical College is an underground metro station on the South-East Corridor of the Green Line of Chennai Metro in Chennai, India. This was inaugurated on 14 May 2017. The station will serve the neighbourhoods of Kilpauk and Chetput. The station has four entry and exit points.

== History ==
=== Construction ===
The Chennai Metro Rail project took 2,756 square meters of land from the Kilpauk Medical College for the construction of the Metro station.

== Station layout ==
G	Street level	Exit/Entrance
L1	Mezzanine	Fare control, station agent, Ticket/token, shops
L2	Platform 2 Northbound	Towards → Chennai Central; Next Station: Nehru Park
L2	Island platform | Doors will open on the right
L2	Platform 1 Southbound	Towards ← St. Thomas Mount; Next Station: Pachaiyappa's College
L3	Side platform | Doors will open on the left
L3	Platform 3 Southbound	Towards → SIPCOT 2 Next Station: Chetpet
L3	Platform 4 Northbound	Towards ← Madhavaram Milk Colony; Next Station: Kellys
L3	Side platform | Doors will open on the left

=== Facilities ===
List of available ATM at Kilpauk Medical College metro station are

== Connections ==
=== Bus ===
Metropolitan Transport Corporation (Chennai) bus routes number 15, 15B, 15C, 15D, 15F, 15FCT, 15G, 27B, 27C, 29B, 29C, 29N, 37D, 37G, 40, 40A, 50, 53A, 53B, 53E, 53P, 54V, 56G, 59, 59A, 71C, 71D, 71E, 71F, 71H, 71V, 101, 101NS, 127B, 129C, 150, 153, 159, 159A, 159ANS, 159B, 159D, 159E, 159F, 159K, 553, 571, B29NGS, J29C, M15LCT, M29B, M29C, M54V, serves the station from nearby K.M.C Hospital bus stand.

=== Rail ===
Chetput railway station

== Entry/Exit ==
Kilpauk Medical College metro station Entry/exits
Gate No-A1	Gate No-A2	Gate No-A3	Gate No-A4

== See also ==
- Chennai
- Chetput (Chennai)
- Chetput Lake
- List of Chennai metro stations
- Chennai Metro
- Railway stations in Chennai
- Chennai Mass Rapid Transit System
- Chennai Monorail
- Chennai Suburban Railway
- Chetput railway station
- Transport in Chennai
- Urban rail transit in India
- List of metro systems
