= Ashok Nagar metro station =

Chennai Metro's Green Line metro station

Ashok Nagar

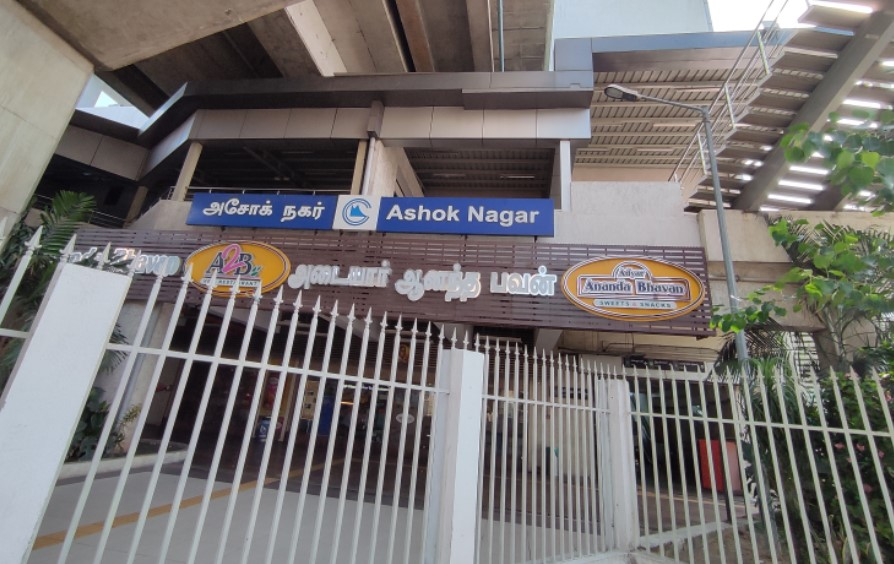

General information
- Location: Sector 10, Ashok Nagar, Chennai, Tamil Nadu 600083
- Coordinates: 13.035483°N 80.211329°E
- System: Chennai Metro station
- Owner: Chennai Metro
- Operator: Chennai Metro Rail Limited (CMRL)
- Line: Green Line Inter Corridor Line
- Platforms: Side platform Platform-1 → St. Thomas Mount; Platform-2 → M.G.R Chennai Central
- Tracks: 2

Construction
- Structure type: Elevated, Double track
- Platform levels: 2
- Accessible: Yes

Other information
- Station code: SAN

History
- Opened: June 29, 2015; 11 years ago
- Electrified: Single-phase 25 kV 50 Hz AC overhead catenary

Services
Preceding station	Chennai Metro	Following station
Vadapalani towards Chennai Central	Green Line	Ekkattuthangal towards St. Thomas Mount
Vadapalani towards Chennai Central	Blue Line (Inter-Corridor Service)	Ekkattuthangal towards Kilambakkam
Route map
Location

Ashok Nagar is an elevated metro station on the South-East Corridor of the Green Line of Chennai Metro in Chennai, India. This station serves the neighbourhoods of Ashok Nagar, K.K. Nagar, and Mambalam.

== History ==
=== Construction history ===
The station was constructed by Consolidated Constructed Consortium (CCCL). The consolidated cost of the station along with the stations of Koyambedu, Arumbakkam, CMBT, and Vadapalani was ₹ 1,395.4 million.

== The station ==
Upon completion, Ashok Nagar Metro Rail station will be the highest elevated station in the entire Chennai Metro Rail system. Initially planned to have a ground floor, a concourse floor and a platform floor, four additional floors have been planned to the original plan to make it a six-storey structure, chiefly to generate revenue by letting out the floors to offices and commercial establishments. After completion, the station will have a height of more than 40 metres, which will be higher than the Alandur metro rail elevated station where the two corridors of Phase I of the Chennai Metro Rail (viz. Washermenpet-Airport and Central-St Thomas Mount lines) converge.

Unlike other stations of the system which are located in the middle of busy main roads, the station is located a little away from 100-Feet Road in the middle of a residential area.

=== Station layout ===
G	Street Level	Exit/Entrance
L1	Mezzanine	Fare control, station agent, Metro Card vending machines, crossover
L2	Side platform | Doors will open on the left
L2	Platform; Northbound	Towards → Chennai Central; Next Station: Vadapalani
L2	Platform 1 Southbound	Towards ← St. Thomas Mount; Next Station: Ekkattuthangal
L2	Side platform | Doors will open on the left
L2

== Supportive infrastructure ==
Along with Koyambedu and Vadapalani Metro stations, Ashok Nagar Metro station will be developed by leasing out space either for shops or office spaces. As part of fire safety measures, underground water tanks of 50,000 to 100,000 litre capacity will be set up at the station.

The station has a skywalk that connects Udayam Theatre with the Metro station.

== Connections ==
Metropolitan Transport Corporation (Chennai) bus routes number 5E, 5T, 11G, 11H, 12G, 18F, 18M, 49A, 77J, 111, 113, 114, 170, 170A, 170B, 170C, 170CET, 170K, 170L, 170M, 170P, 170S, 270J, 500C, 568C, 568T, 570, 570AC, 570S, A70, B70, D70, D70CUT, D70NS, D170, F70, M70, M70CNS, M70D, M70NS, M70S, M170T, M270, S20, S26, S86 serves the station from nearby Udhayam Theatre (Ashok Pillar) bus stand.

== See also ==
- List of Chennai metro stations
- Chennai Metro
- Railway stations in Chennai
- Chennai Mass Rapid Transit System
- Chennai Monorail
- Chennai Suburban Railway
- Transport in Chennai
- List of metro systems in India
- List of rapid transit systems in India
- List of metro systems
