= Egmore metro station =

Chennai Metro's Green Line metro station

Egmore

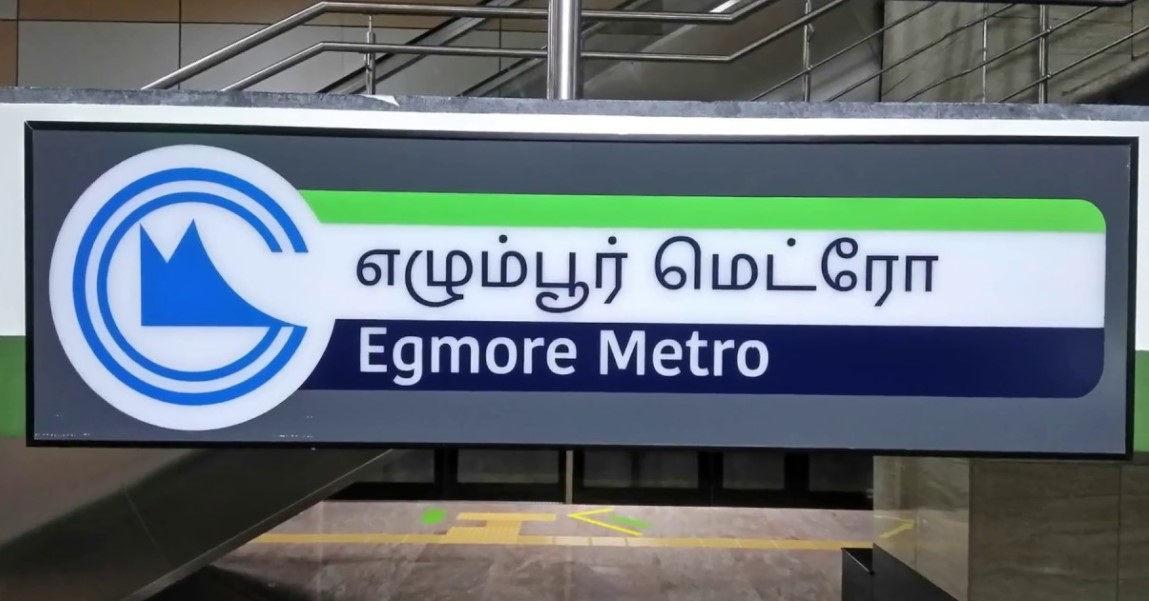

General information
- Location: Egmore, Chennai, Tamil Nadu - 600008
- Coordinates: 13°04′45″N 80°15′40″E
- Elevation: 52 m (171 ft)
- System: Chennai Metro station
- Owner: Chennai Metro
- Operator: Chennai Metro Rail Limited (CMRL)
- Line: Green Line Inter Corridor Line
- Platforms: Island platform Platform-1 → St. Thomas Mount; Platform-2 → M.G.R Chennai Central
- Tracks: 2
- Connections: Chennai Egmore

Construction
- Structure type: Underground, Double Track
- Platform levels: 2
- Parking: Available
- Accessible: Yes

Other information
- Station code: SEG

History
- Opened: 25 May 2018; 8 years ago
- Electrified: Single-phase 25 kV 50 Hz AC overhead catenary

Services
| Preceding station | Chennai Metro | Following station |
|---|---|---|
| Chennai Central Terminus | Green Line | Nehru Park towards St. Thomas Mount |
| Chennai Central Terminus | Blue Line (inter-corridor service) | Nehru Park towards Kilambakkam |
Route map
Location

Egmore Metro is an underground metro station on the South-East Corridor of the Green Line of Chennai Metro in Chennai, India. This station serves the neighbourhoods of Egmore and Vepery. It covers an area of about 8,000 square meter and is located adjacent to the Egmore railway station. The station has four entry and exit points.

== Station layout ==
| G | Street level | Exit/entrance |
| M | Mezzanine | Fare control, station agent, ticket/token, shops |
| P | Platform 2 Northbound | Towards → Chennai Central; Change at the next station for Blue Line |
| P | Island platform | Doors will open on the right |
| P | Platform 1 Southbound | Towards ← St. Thomas Mount; Next station: Nehru Park |

== Connections ==
=== Bus ===
Metropolitan Transport Corporation (Chennai) bus routes number 15A, 15B, 20, 23A, 28, 28A, 28B, 53A, 53E, and 120K serve the station from nearby Egmore bus stand.

=== Rail ===
- Chennai Egmore railway station

== Entry/exit ==
Egmore metro station entry/exits
| Gate No-A1 | Gate No-A2 | Gate No-A3 | Gate No-A4 |
|---|---|---|---|
| Chennai Egmore Railway Station (Platform 9) | | | |

== See also ==
- Chetput (Chennai)
- Chetput Lake
- List of Chennai metro stations
- Railway stations in Chennai
- Chennai Mass Rapid Transit System
- Chennai Monorail
- Chennai Suburban Railway
- Chetput railway station
- Transport in Chennai
- Urban rail transit in India
- List of metro systems
