= Anna Nagar East metro station =

Chennai Metro's Green Line metro station

Anna Nagar East

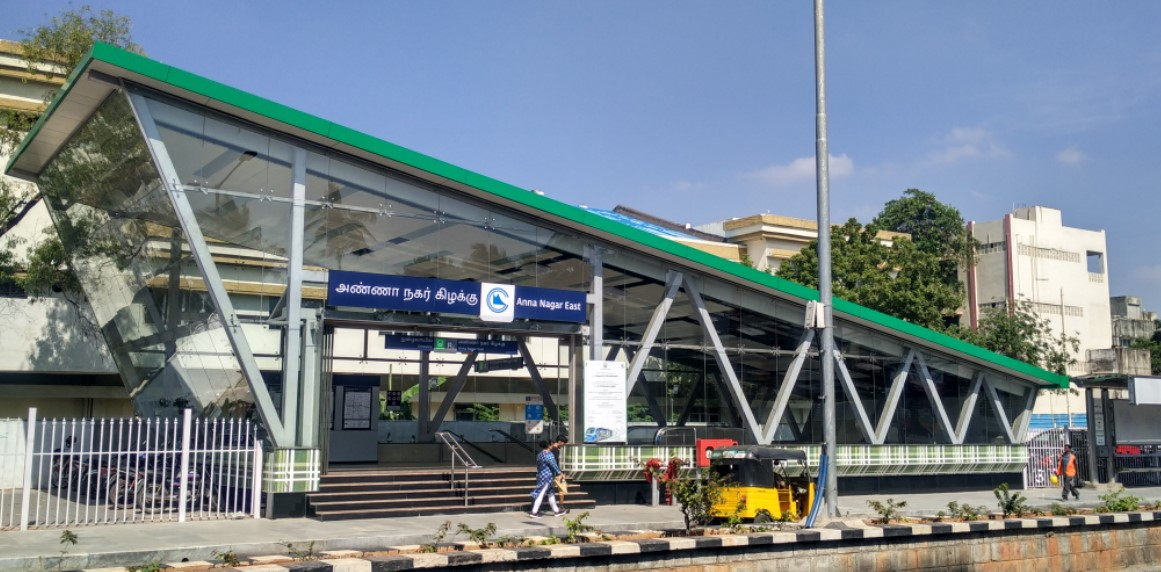

General information
- Location: A Block, Annanagar East, Chennai, Tamil Nadu 600102
- Coordinates: 13.0846°N 80.2194°E
- System: Chennai Metro station
- Owner: Chennai Metro
- Operator: Chennai Metro Rail Limited (CMRL)
- Line: Green Line Inter Corridor Line
- Platforms: Island platform Platform-1 → St. Thomas Mount; Platform-2 → M.G.R Chennai Central
- Tracks: 2

Construction
- Structure type: Underground, Double track
- Parking: Available
- Cycle facilities: Free bicycle
- Accessible: Yes

Other information
- Station code: SAE

History
- Opened: 14 May 2017; 9 years ago
- Electrified: Single-phase 25 kV 50 Hz AC overhead catenary

Services
Preceding station	Chennai Metro	Following station
Shenoy Nagar towards Chennai Central	Green Line	Anna Nagar Tower towards St. Thomas Mount
Shenoy Nagar towards Chennai Central	Blue Line (Inter-Corridor Service)	Anna Nagar Tower towards Kilambakkam
Route map
Location

Anna Nagar East is an underground metro station on the South-East Corridor of the Green Line of Chennai Metro in Chennai, India. This station will serve the neighbourhoods of Anna Nagar, Villivakkam, and Kilpauk. The station has four entry and exit points.

== Station layout ==
G	Street level	Exit/Entrance
M	Mezzanine	Fare control, station agent, Ticket/token, shops
P	Platform 2 Northbound	Towards → Chennai Central; Next Station: Shenoy Nagar
P	Island platform | Doors will open on the right
P	Platform 1 Southbound	Towards ← St. Thomas Mount; Next Station: Anna Nagar Tower

== See also ==
- Anna Nagar
- List of Chennai metro stations
- Chennai Metro
- Railway stations in Chennai
- Chennai Mass Rapid Transit System
- Chennai Monorail
- Chennai Suburban Railway
- Transport in Chennai
- List of metro systems in India
- List of rapid transit systems in India
- List of metro systems
