= Masjid e Mahmood, Choolaimedu =

Mosque in Chennai, Tamil Nadu, India

Masjid e Mahmood
- Location of the mosque in Chennai

Religion
- Affiliation: Islam
- Ecclesiastical or organisational status: Mosque
- Status: Active

Location
- Location: Choolaimedu, Chennai, Tamil Nadu
- Country: India
- Coordinates: 13°03′53″N 80°13′48″E

Architecture
- Type: Mosque architecture
- Minaret: Three

The Masjid e Mahmood, also known as the E Mahmood Mosque, is a mosque located in the Choolaimedu neighbourhood of Chennai, in the state of Tamil Nadu, India. The mosque is situated in Basha Street, near the Nungambakkam railway station.

== See also ==
- Islam in India
- List of mosques in India
