= CMBT metro station =

Chennai Metro's Green Line metro station

Puratchi Thalaivi Dr. J. Jayalalithaa CMBT Metro Station

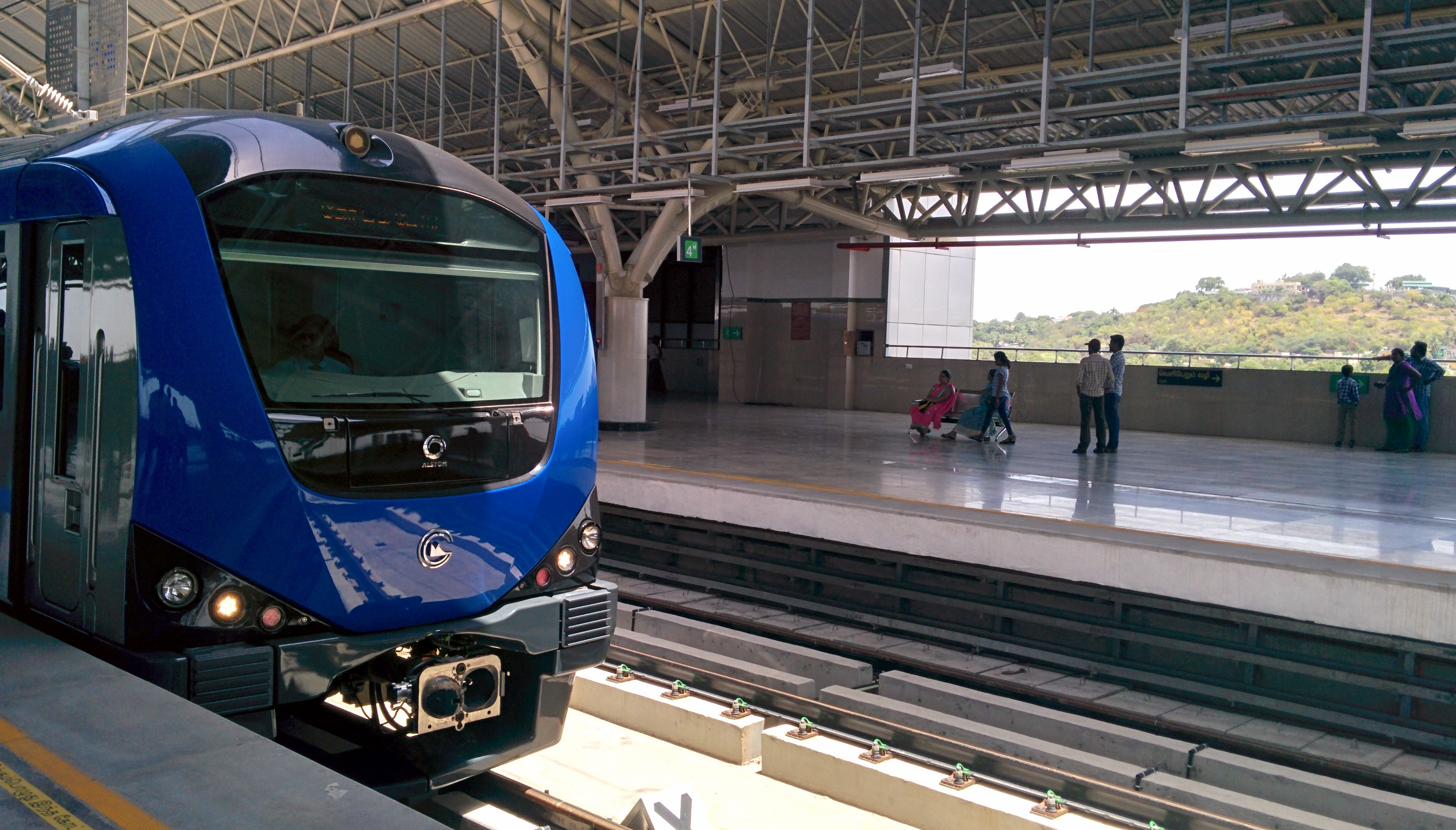
- A train arriving at the station

General information
- Other names: Puratchi Thalaivi Dr. J. Jayalalithaa CMBT Metro Station
- Location: Koyambedu, Chennai, Tamil Nadu; India
- Coordinates: 13.0685°N 80.2041°E
- Elevation: 8 metres (26 ft)
- System: Chennai Metro station
- Owner: Chennai Metro Rail Limited
- Operator: Chennai Metro Rail Limited
- Line: Green Line Inter Corridor Line
- Platforms: Side platform Platform-1 → St. Thomas Mount; Platform-2 → M.G.R Chennai Central
- Tracks: 2
- Connections: Chennai Mofussil Bus Terminus

Construction
- Structure type: Elevated, doubletrack
- Platform levels: 2
- Parking: Available
- Cycle facilities: Free Bicycle Available
- Accessible: Yes

Other information
- Status: Staffed
- Station code: SCM
- Website: chennaimetrorail.org

History
- Opened: 29 June 2015 (Green Line)
- Electrified: Single-phase 25 kV 50 Hz AC overhead catenary

Services
Preceding station	Chennai Metro	Following station
Koyambedu towards Chennai Central	Green Line	Arumbakkam towards St. Thomas Mount
Koyambedu towards Chennai Central	Blue Line (Inter-Corridor Service)	Arumbakkam towards Kilambakkam
Route map
Location

CMBT Metro, officially known as Puratchi Thalaivi Dr. J. Jayalalithaa CMBT Metro, is an important elevated metro station on the South-East Corridor of the Green Line of Chennai Metro in Chennai, India, which will chiefly serve the Chennai Mofussil Bus Terminus in front of the main facade. It was renamed by Government of Tamil Nadu as Puratchi Thalaivi Dr. J. Jayalalithaa CMBT Metro to honor the former Chief Minister of Tamil Nadu J. Jayalalithaa On 31 July 2020.

== Construction history ==
The station was constructed by Consolidated Constructed Consortium (CCCL). The station attained structural completion in December 2012. The consolidated cost of the station along with the stations of Arumbakkam, Koyambedu, Vadapalani and Ashok Nagar was ₹ 1,395.4 million.

== The station ==
Elevation of the platforms is about 15 metres (49 ft) from the ground level and the total length of the platforms is 140 metres (460 ft). The station can handle about 23,000 passengers an hour.

=== Station layout ===
G	Street Level	Exit/Entrance
L1	Mezzanine	Fare control, station agent, Metro Card vending machines, crossover
L2	Side platform | Doors will open on the left
L2	Platform 2 Northbound	Towards → Chennai Central; Next Station: Koyambedu
L2	Platform 1 Southbound	Towards ← St. Thomas Mount; Next Station: Arumbakkam
L2	Side platform | Doors will open on the left

== Supportive infrastructure ==
The station lies within 1 kilometre (0.62 mi) from the Koyambedu Junction. At least three pedestrian underpass has been planned on Jawaharlal Nehru Road and Kaliamman Koil Street.

== Commercial hub ==
The station is one of the five stations in the first phase of the Chennai Metro project identified to be converted into commercial hubs, the others being Arignar Anna Alandur, Arumbakkam, Ekkattuthangal, and Ashok Nagar. Two buildings are planned on either ends of the station depending on the availability of land.

== See also ==
- List of Chennai metro stations
- Railway stations in Chennai
- Chennai Mass Rapid Transit System
- Chennai Monorail
- Chennai Suburban Railway
- Transport in Chennai
- List of metro systems in India
- Chennai Central metro station
- List of rapid transit systems in India
- List of metro systems
