= Ekkattuthangal metro station =

Chennai Metro's Green Line metro station

Ekkattuthangal Metro

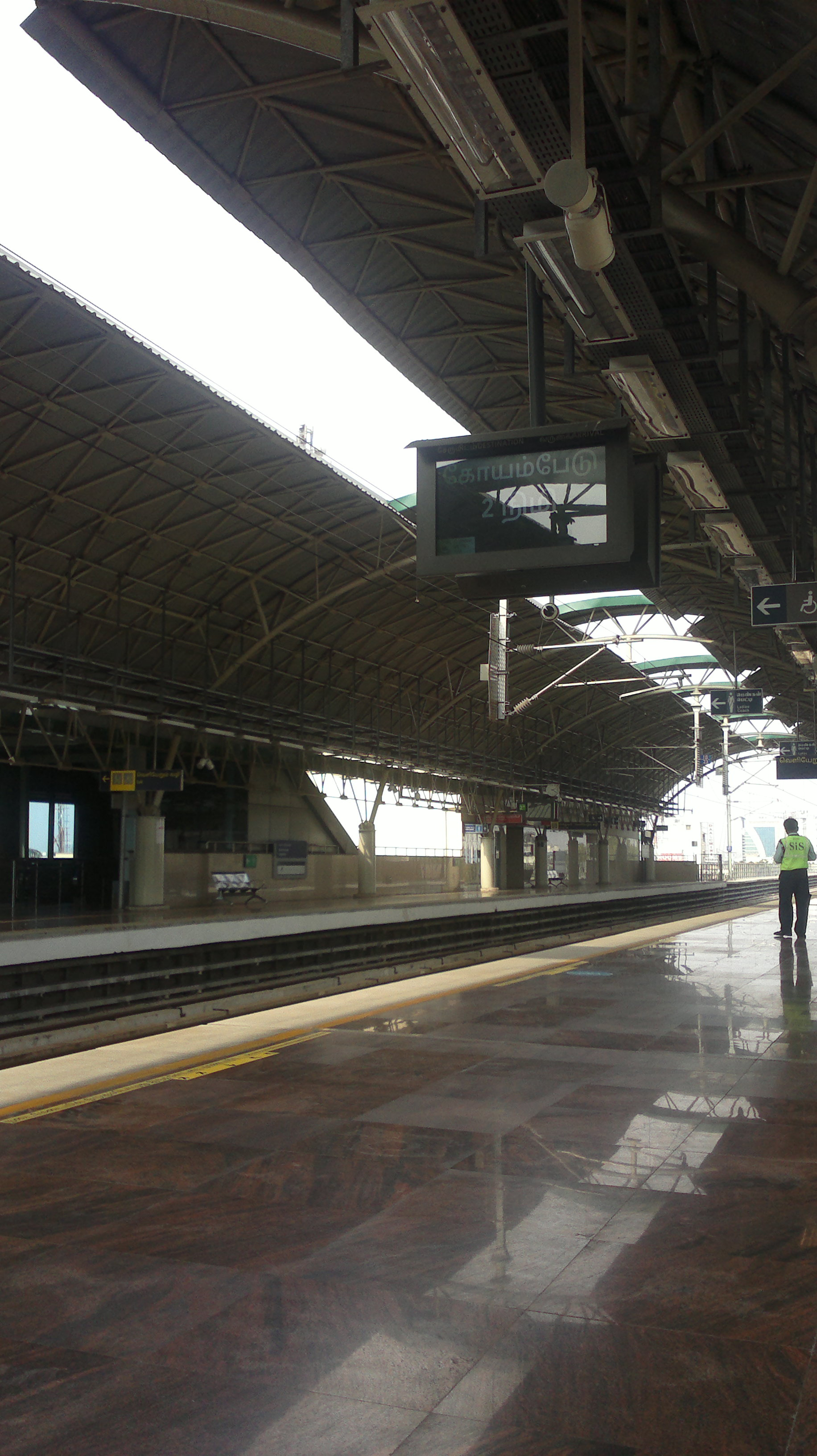
- Chennai Ekkattuthangal Metro Station

General information
- Location: Jawaharlal Nehru Rd, Labour Colony, SIDCO Industrial Estate, Ekkattuthangal, Chennai Tamil Nadu 600032
- Coordinates: 13.017128°N 80.205302°E,
- System: Chennai Metro station
- Owner: Chennai Metro
- Operator: Chennai Metro Rail Limited (CMRL)
- Line: Green Line Inter Corridor Line
- Platforms: Side platform Platform-1 → St. Thomas Mount; Platform-2 → M.G.R Chennai Central
- Tracks: 2

Construction
- Structure type: Elevated, Double Track
- Platform levels: 2
- Accessible: Yes

Other information
- Station code: SSI

History
- Opened: June 29, 2015; 11 years ago
- Electrified: Single-phase 25 kV 50 Hz AC overhead catenary

Services
Preceding station	Chennai Metro	Following station
Ashok Nagar towards Chennai Central	Green Line	Alandur towards St. Thomas Mount
Ashok Nagar towards Chennai Central	Blue Line (Inter-Corridor Service)	Alandur towards Kilambakkam
Route map
Location

Ekkattuthangal is an elevated metro station on the South-East Corridor of the Green Line of Chennai Metro in Chennai, India. This station will serve the neighbourhoods of Ekkattuthangal, West Mambalam, Guindy Industrial Estate and West Saidapet.

== The station ==
The station is being constructed as an elevated station on the arterial Inner Ring Road. The station will have ground, concourse and platform levels.

=== Station layout ===
G	Street Level	Exit/Entrance
L1	Mezzanine	Fare control, station agent, Metro Card vending machines, crossover
L2	Side platform | Doors will open on the left
L2	Platform 2 Northbound	Towards → Chennai Central; Next Station: Ashok Nagar
L2	Platform 1 Southbound	Towards ← St. Thomas Mount; Next Station: Arignar Anna Alandur Change at the next station for Blue Line
L2	Side platform | Doors will open on the left
L2

== Connections ==
Metropolitan Transport Corporation (Chennai) bus routes number 10E, 18F, 18M, 70/70A, 70C, 70D, 70G, 70K, 70S, 70T, 70V, 70W, 77J, 111, 113, 114, 154E, 170, 170A, 170B, 170C, 170CET, 170G, 170K, 170L, 170M, 170P, 170S, 170T, 270J, 500C, 554B, 568C, 568T, 570, 570AC, 570S, A70, B70, D70, D70CUT, D70NS, D170, F70, G70, L18, L51, L70, M70, M70CNS, M70D, M70F, M70NS, M70S, M170T, M270, T70 serves the station from nearby Ekkattuthangal bus stand.

== Commercial hub ==
Ekkattuthangal station is one of the five stations in the first phase of the Chennai Metro project identified to be converted into commercial hubs, the others being CMBT, Alandur, Arumbakkam, and Ashok Nagar. A 106,000 sq ft building with nine floors has been planned at the station, opposite Hilton Chennai hotel.

== See also ==
- List of Chennai metro stations
- Chennai Metro
- Railway stations in Chennai
- Chennai Mass Rapid Transit System
- Chennai Monorail
- Chennai Suburban Railway
- Transport in Chennai
- List of metro systems in India
- List of rapid transit systems in India
- List of metro systems
