= Green Line (Chennai Metro) =

Transit line in Chennai, India

Green Line (Line 2)
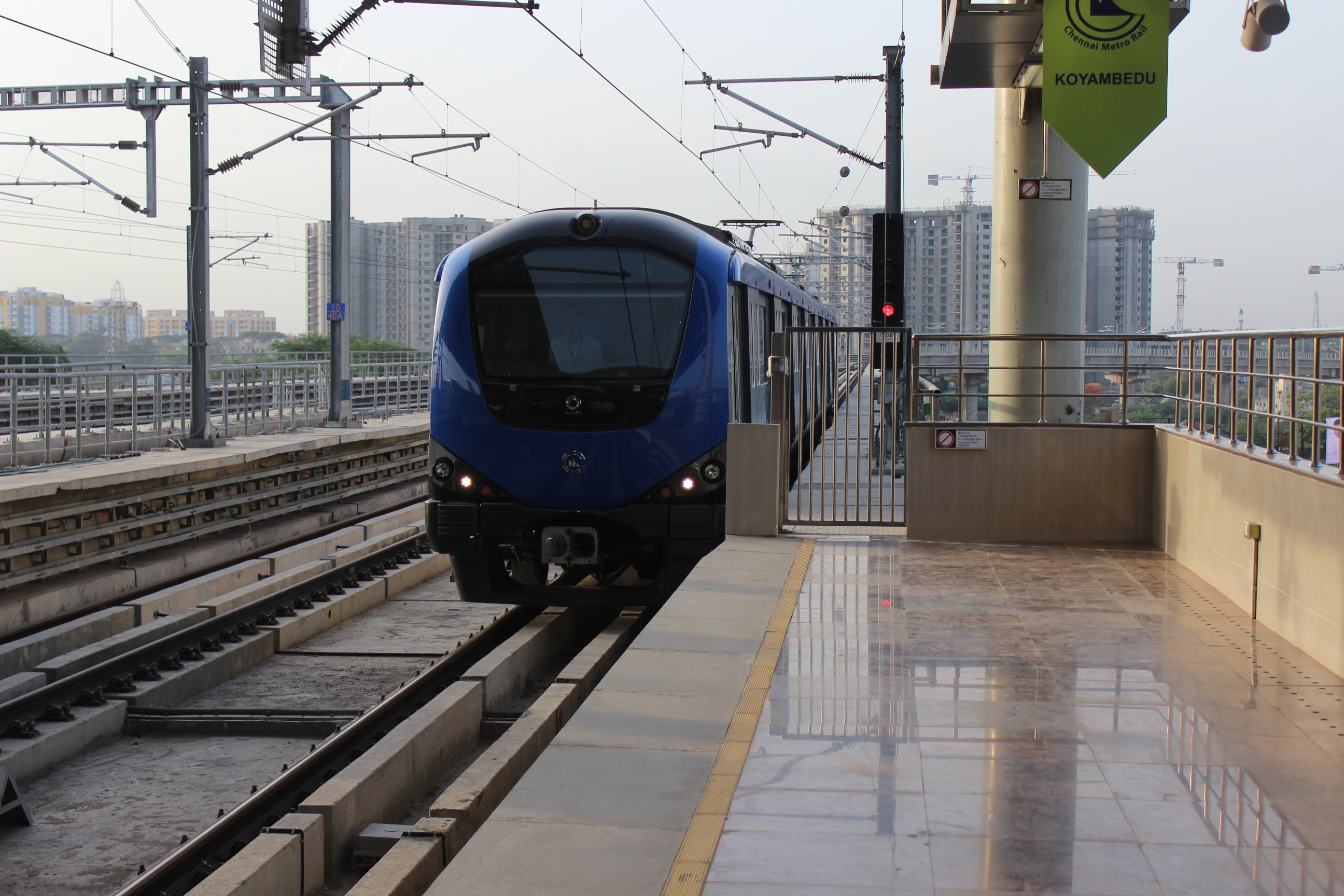
- A metro train on the Green Line entering Koyambedu station

Overview
- Other name: Chennai Central - St. Thomas Mount Line
- Native name: பச்சை வழித்தடம்
- Status: Operational
- Locale: Chennai
- Termini: Chennai Central; St. Thomas Mount
- Connecting lines: Operational (8): Blue Line Chennai MRTS , Chennai Suburban North Line , Chennai Suburban West Line , Chennai Suburban West North Line, Chennai Suburban South Line , Chennai Suburban South West Line Yellow Line Upcoming (2): Purple Line Red Line
- Stations: 17

Service
- Type: Rapid transit
- System: Chennai Metro
- Operator: Chennai Metro Rail Limited
- Depot: Koyambedu
- Rolling stock: Alstom

History
- Opened: 29 June 2015; 11 years ago
- Last extension: 2018

Technical
- Line length: 22 km (14 mi)
- Num of tracks: 2
- Character: 9.7 km (6.0 mi) underground 12.3 km (7.6 mi) elevated
- Track gauge: 1,435 mm (4 ft 8 1/2 in) standard gauge
- Electrification: 25 kV 50 Hz AC overhead catenary
- Operating speed: 80 km/h (50 mph)

The Green Line or Line 2 is one of the three operational lines of Chennai Metro, along with the Blue line and the Yellow line in the city of Chennai. The line stretches from Chennai Central to St. Thomas Mount, covering a distance of 22 km (14 mi). The line consists of 17 stations out of which nine stations are underground and the rest are elevated or on ground level.

Planning for the metro started in 2007-08 with the construction commencing in February 2009. Testing began in 2014, and the Commissioner of Metro Rail Safety approved the operations in January 2015. On 29 June 2015, commercial operations started between Alandur and Koyambedu stations on the Green Line, with the first underground section between Thirumangalam to Nehru Park operational on 14 May 2017, which was later extended to Chennai Central on 25 May 2018.

== Planning and construction ==
In 2006, a modern metro rail system was planned for Chennai modeled after the Delhi Metro. Delhi Metro Rail Corporation (DMRC) was tasked with preparing a detailed project report on the implementation of the metro system in Chennai. Based on the report, the Government of Tamil Nadu approved the first phase of the project in November 2007. The first phase was planned with two lines covering 45.1 km (28.0 mi) with 25 km (15.5 mi) being underground. The first corridor would connect Washermanpet with Chennai International Airport extending for 23.1 km (14.4 mi) with 14.3 km (8.9 mi) being underground. In December 2007, Chennai Metro Rail Limited (CMRL) was incorporated and the Government of India gave approval for the project in January 2009.

In February 2009, a ₹199 crore (US$21 million) contract was awarded for the construction of a 4.5 km (2.80 mi) long viaduct along the Inner Ring Road between Koyambedu and Ashok Nagar. The construction started on 10 June 2009. In August 2010, the contract for supplying rolling stock was awarded to Alstom. In January 2011, a joint venture between Larsen and Toubro and Alstom was awarded the contract for design and construction of track works and a depot at Koyambedu for ₹449.22 crore (US$48 million).

On 14 February 2014, the maiden trial run was conducted between Koyambedu and Ashok Nagar stations. In August 2014, the metro received the statutory speed certification clearance from the Research Design and Standards Organisation. In January 2015, a report was submitted to the Commissioner of Metro Rail Safety for approval. In April 2015, the Commissioner of Metro Rail Safety inspected the rolling stock and submitted the report to the Railway Board.

On 29 June 2015, commercial operations started between Alandur and Koyambedu stations on the Green Line. On 14 May 2017, operations commenced in the first underground line between Thirumangalam to Nehru Park on the Green Line, which was extended to Chennai central on 25 May 2018.

Line name	Terminals		Stations	Opened	Map
Green Line	Koyambedu	Alandur	7	29 June 2015	
Green Line	Alandur	St. Thomas Mount	1	14 October 2016	
Green Line	Koyambedu	Nehru Park	7	15 May 2017	
Green Line	Nehru Park	Central	2	25 May 2018	

== Infrastructure ==
The trains are operated on 1,435 mm (4 ft 8 1/2 in) standard gauge double-tracked lines. The average speed of operation is 85 kilometres per hour (53 mph) and maximum speed is 120 kilometres per hour (75 mph). Alstom supplies the rolling stock for the trains operated on the line. The trains are air-conditioned with electrically operated automatic sliding doors and have a first-class compartment with a dedicated section reserved for women. The trains operate on a 25 kV AC traction catenary system. The trains are connected to the grid via overhead electric cables and are equipped with regenerative braking with a capacity to recover 30–35% of the energy during braking. The electricity is supplied by Tamil Nadu Electricity Board.

== Network ==
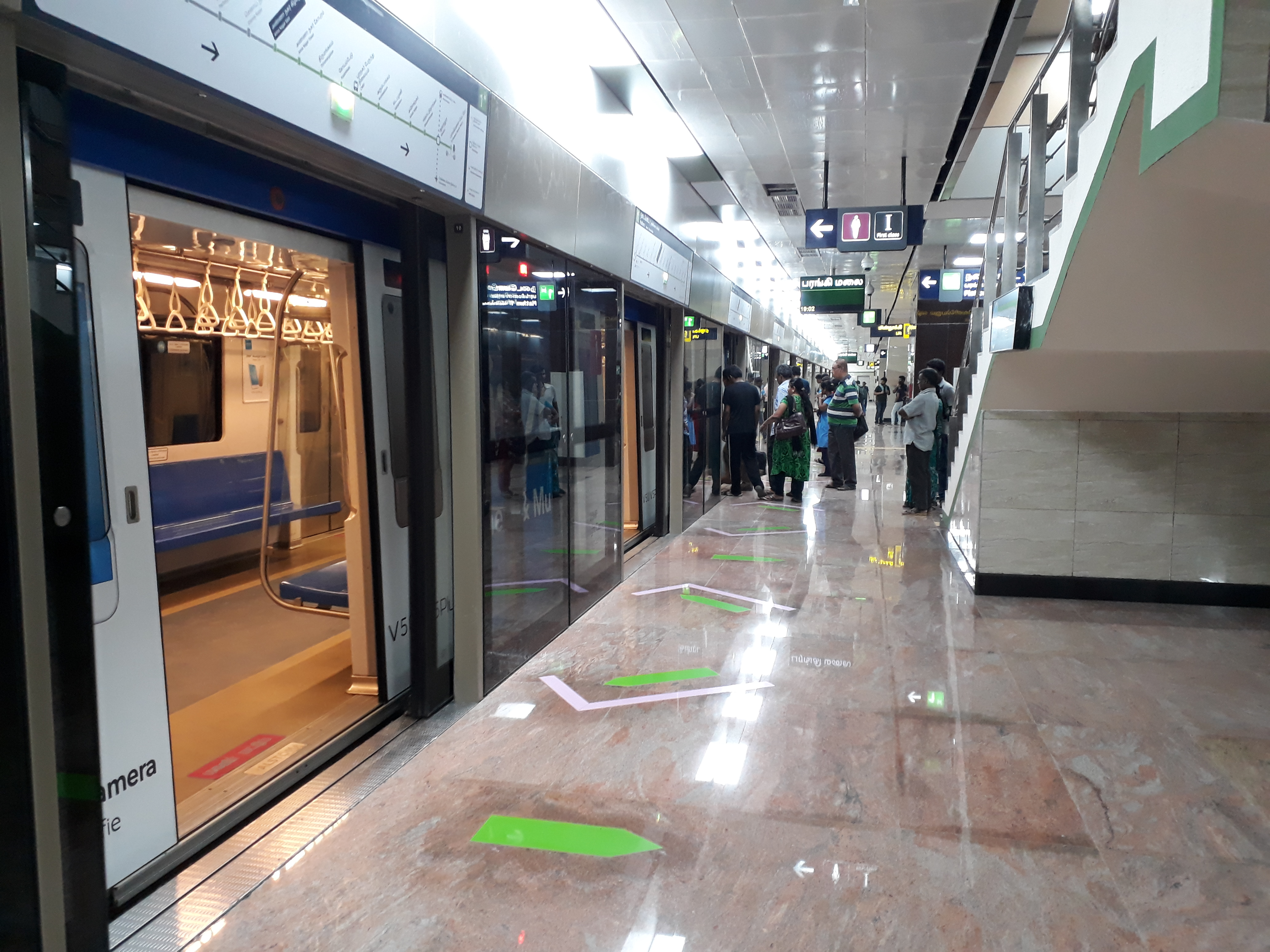
Platform screen doors in underground stations

A total of 26 stations are operational along the blue line with 13 underground stations. In the underground sections, a walkway runs along the length with cross passages every 250 metres (820 ft 3 in) for the maintenance and emergency evacuation. The underground stations have an average width of 200 metres (656 ft 2 in) and average depth of 20 feet (6.1 m) from the ground level. The length of the stations in Phase 1 extension is 180 metres (590 ft 7 in). The elevated stations have three levels with the concourse level at a minimum height of 5.5 metres (18 ft 1 in) above the ground level and platform level above the concourse while the underground stations have two levels with platform screen doors. The stations are air-conditioned and are equipped to be disabled and elderly friendly, with automatic fare collection system, announcement system, electronic display boards, escalators and lifts. Paid parking facilities are available for two wheelers in most stations and four wheelers in select stations.

The line connects the central and the southwest ends of the city. The stations include:

Green Line
S.no	Station name		Opened	Connections	Station layout	Platform level type
S.no	English	Tamil	Opened	Connections	Station layout	Platform level type
1	Puratchi Thalaivar Dr. M.G. Ramachandran Central metro station	சென்ட்ரல்	25 May 2018	Blue Line; Chennai Central; Park (South Line); Moore Market (West Line); Park Town (Chennai MRTS)	Underground	Island
2	Egmore	எழும்பூர்	25 May 2018	Chennai Egmore	Underground	Island
3	Nehru Park	நேரு பூங்கா	15 May 2017		Underground	Island
4	Kilpauk	கீழ்ப்பாக்கம்	15 May 2017	Purple Line (under construction)	Underground	Island
5	Pachaiyappa's College	பச்சையப்பன் கல்லூரி	15 May 2017		Underground	Island
6	Shenoy Nagar	செனாய் நகர்	15 May 2017		Underground	Island
7	Anna Nagar East	அண்ணா நகர் கிழக்கு	15 May 2017		Underground	Island
8	Anna Nagar Tower	அண்ணா நகர் கோபுரம்	15 May 2017		Underground	Island
9	Thirumangalam	திருமங்கலம்	15 May 2017	Red Line (under construction)	Underground	Island
10	Koyambedu	கோயம்பேடு	29 June 2015	Red Line (under construction)	Elevated	Side
11	Puratchi Thalaivi Dr. J. Jayalalithaa CMBT metro station	சென்னை புறநகர் பேருந்து நிலையம்	29 June 2015	Chennai Mofussil Bus Terminus	Elevated	Side
12	Arumbakkam	அரும்பாக்கம்	29 June 2015		Elevated	Side
13	Vadapalani	வடபழனி	29 June 2015	Yellow Line	Elevated	Side
14	Ashok Nagar	அசோக் நகர்	29 June 2015		Elevated	Side
15	Ekkattuthangal	ஈக்காட்டுத்தாங்கல்	29 June 2015		Elevated	Side
16	Alandur	ஆலந்தூர்	29 June 2015	Blue Line; Red Line (under construction)	Elevated	Side
17	St. Thomas Mount	பரங்கிமலை	14 October 2016	Red Line (under construction); St. Thomas Mount (South Line); St. Thomas Mount (Chennai MRTS)^{[§]}	Elevated	Side

^{§} under construction

== Operations ==
As of 2022, the metro operates trains from 5 AM to 11 PM with an average frequency of one train every 5 minutes in peak hours and every 8 minutes in lean hours in the Green Line. The main operational control center (OCC) is located in Koyambedu where the movement of trains and real-time CCTV footage obtained is monitored. Chennai Metro maintains a major depot at Koyambedu covering an area of 26 ha (64 acres) which houses maintenance workshops, stabling lines, test tracks and a washing plant for the trains. The minimum fare is ₹10 and the maximum fare is ₹50. There are six types of tickets issued by CMRL for travel in Chennai Metro.

== See also ==
- List of rapid transit systems in India
- List of metro systems
