= Koyambedu metro station =

Chennai Metro's Green Line metro station

Koyambedu

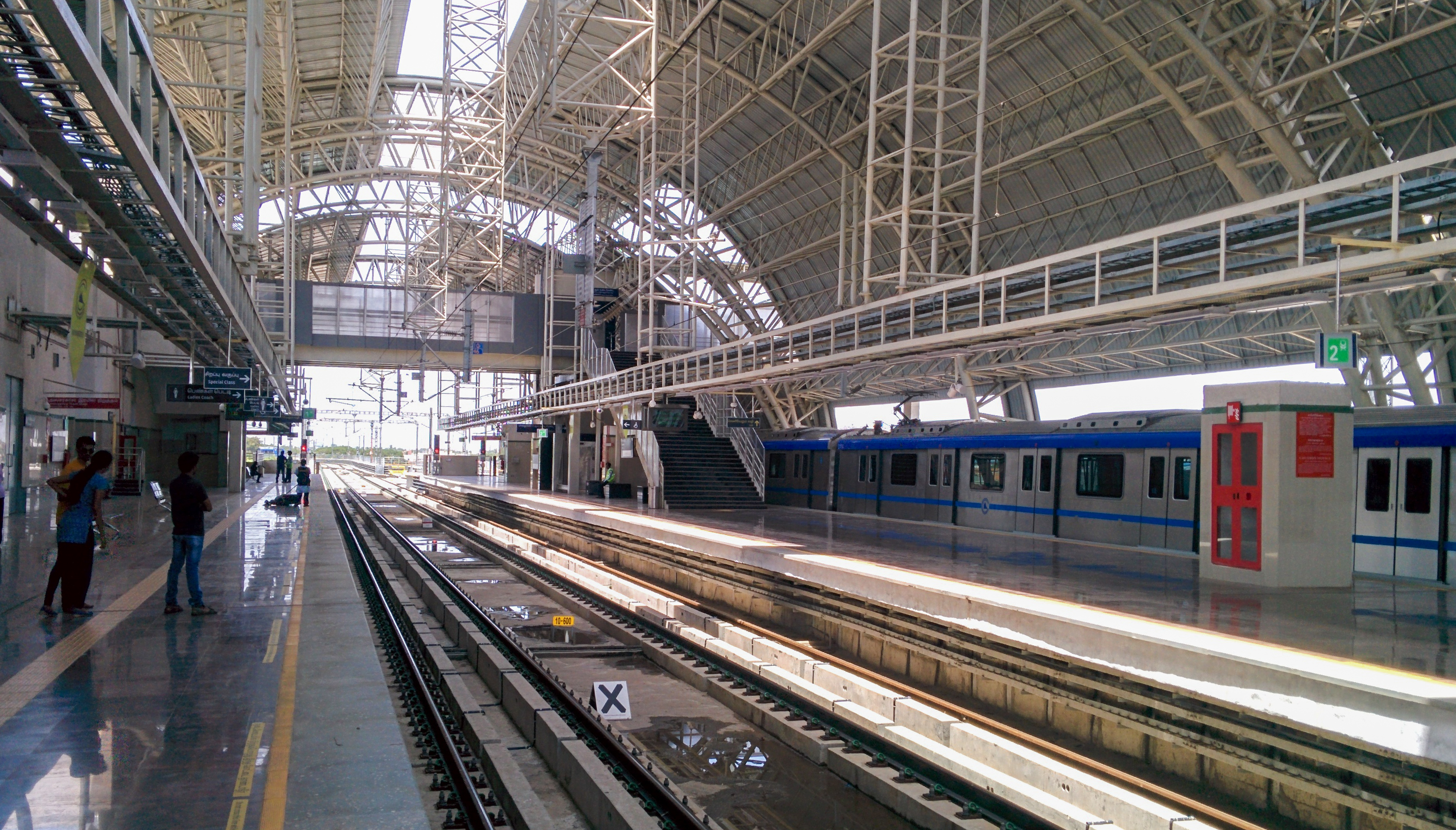
- Koyembedu Station

General information
- Location: Koyambedu, Chennai, Tamil Nadu 600107
- Coordinates: 13.0736°N 80.1948°E
- System: Chennai Metro station
- Owner: Chennai Metro
- Operator: Chennai Metro Rail Limited (CMRL)
- Line: Green Line Red Line Inter Corridor Line
- Platforms: Side platform Platform-1 → St. Thomas Mount; Platform-2 → M.G.R Chennai Central; New Station building Platform 3 → Sholinganallur; Platform 4 → Madhavaram Depot; Platform 5 → Pattabiram
- Tracks: 5

Construction
- Structure type: Elevated, Double track
- Platform levels: 2
- Parking: available
- Cycle facilities: Free bicycle available
- Accessible: Yes

Other information
- Status: Staffed
- Station code: SKO

History
- Opened: June 29, 2015; 11 years ago
- Electrified: Single-phase 25 kV 50 Hz AC overhead catenary

Services
Preceding station	Chennai Metro	Following station
Thirumangalam towards Chennai Central	Green Line	CMBT towards St. Thomas Mount
Thirumangalam towards Chennai Central	Blue Line (Inter-Corridor Service)	CMBT towards Kilambakkam
Annanagar KV towards Madhavaram Depot	Red Line (Under Construction)	Koyambedu Market towards Sholinganallur
Padi Pudhu Nagar towards Pattabiram	Red Line (Future service)	Koyambedu Market towards Sholinganallur
Route map
Location

Koyambedu is an important elevated metro station on the South-East Corridor of the Green Line of Chennai Metro in Chennai, India. This station will serve the neighbourhoods of Koyambedu, Koyambedu vegetable market, and Koyambedu Private Bus Terminus.

== Construction history ==
The station was constructed by Consolidated Constructed Consortium (CCCL). The station attained structural completion in December 2012. The consolidated cost of the station along with the stations of Arumbakkam, CMBT, Vadapalani and Ashok Nagar was ₹ 1,395.4 million.

== The station ==
The station will be able to handle about 23,000 passengers an hour. Elevation of the platforms will be about 15 m from the ground level and the total length of the platforms will be 140 m.

=== Station layout ===
G	Street level	Exit/Entrance
L1	Mezzanine	Fare control, station agent, Metro Card vending machines, crossover
L2	Side platform | Doors will open on the left
L2	Platform 2 Eastbound	Towards → Chennai Central; Next Station: Thirumangalam
L2	Platform 1 Southbound	Towards ← St. Thomas Mount; Next Station: Puratchi Thalaivi Dr. J.Jayalalithaa CMBT
L2	Island platform | P2 Doors will open on the left
L2	Track 3	Towards → Koyambedu Depot
L2	Side platform | Doors will open on the left
L2	Platform 3 Southbound	Towards → Sholinganallur; Next Station: Koyambedu Market
L2	Platform 4 Northbound	Towards ← Madhavaram Depot; Next Station: Anna Nagar KV
L2	Platform 5 Northbound	Towards ← Pattabiram; Next Station: Padi Pudhu Nagar

=== Facilities ===
List of available ATM at Koyambedu metro station are

== Supportive infrastructure ==
Along with Chennai Central and Alandur stations, the station will have a 230-kV receiving sub-station for power supply from the state's electricity grid. The sub-station will supply 25-kV of electricity to the trains and 33-kV to the stations.

Along with Ashok Nagar and Vadapalani Metro stations, Koyambedu Metro station will be developed by leasing out space either for shops or office spaces. As part of fire safety measures, underground water tanks of 50,000 to 100,000 litre capacity will be set up at the station.

The station lies within 1 km from the Koyambedu Junction. The highways department has proposed a 1-km flyover that passes through Jawaharlal Nehru Road–Kaliamman Koil Street Junction. A skywalk has also been planned near the station across the Ponamallee High Road. The skywalk will link Rohini theatre with the Koyambedu Metro station.

== Connections ==
Koyambedu Metro Station is well-connected through multiple feeder and last-mile transit options provided by Chennai Metro Rail Limited (CMRL):

- Feeder Buses (Metro Connect): CMRL operates shuttle services such as:
  - Route S51: Koyambedu Metro – Nerkundram – Mogappair West – Nolambur – Sakthi Nagar.
  - Route S60: CMBT Metro – Koyambedu – Nerkundram – Maduravoyal – Erikarai.
- Bike and Cycle Rentals: Rental bicycles and motorbike sharing services are available near station exits.
- Auto Rickshaws & Shared Transport: Prepaid autos and shared vehicles are accessible from designated pickup zones.
- Parking: Paid parking is available for both two-wheelers and four-wheelers.

== Entry/Exit points ==
The Koyambedu Metro Station has five entry/exit points labelled A to E. Each entrance provides access to nearby landmarks, and most have accessibility features such as lifts and escalators.

Entrance	Nearby landmarks / directions	Lift	Escalator	Stairs
A	Maduravoyal, Poonamallee, Omni Bus Stand, Lanson Toyota		✓	✓
B	Koyambedu Omni Bus Stand, CMDA Building		✓	✓
C	CMRL Depot/Admin Office, Koyambedu Market, TNEB Substation			✓
D	Kurungaleeswarar Temple, Koyambedu Post Office	✓		
E	Rohini Theatre, VR Chennai Mall	✓		

== See also ==
- List of Chennai metro stations
- Chennai Metro
- Railway stations in Chennai
- Chennai Mass Rapid Transit System
- Chennai Monorail
- Chennai Suburban Railway
- Transport in Chennai
- List of metro systems in India
- List of rapid transit systems in India
- List of metro systems
