= Choolaimedu =

- neighbourhood
- Location within Chennai Location within Tamil Nadu Location within India
- Coordinates: 13.0628°N 80.2275°E
- Country: India
- State: Tamil Nadu
- District: Chennai District
- Metro: Chennai

Government
  - Body: Chennai Corporation

Languages
  - Official: Tamil
- Time zone: UTC+5:30 (IST)
- PIN: 600094
- Vehicle registration: TN 10
- Legislative Assembly constituency: anna nagar and thousand light.
- Planning agency: CMDA
- Civic agency: Chennai Corporation
- Website: www.chennai.tn.nic.in

Choolaimedu is a large residential and commercial locality in Chennai, Tamil Nadu, India. It borders Kodambakkam, Vadapalani, M.M.D.A. Colony, Aminjikarai, Mahalingapuram, and Nungambakkam. Previously part of Puliyur village in Kodambakkam, Choolaimedu has now become a hub for commercial interests and connects two of the busiest routes in Chennai, namely Arcot Road and Nelson Manickam Road.

Both Nungambakkam and Kodambakkam railway stations lie closest to Choolaimedu and Arumbakkam metro rail station also. Choolaimedu is closer to institutions like Loyola College, Meenakshi Engineering College and Panimalar Polytechnic.

Nelson Manickam Road bus line connects buses from the eastern suburbs of Chennai to the south and the west of Chennai. The neighbourhood is served by the Nungambakkam railway station.

The neighbourhood is also home to the Anna Nedum Pathai (also called Anna High Road) fruit and vegetable market.

There are numerous temples, churches and mosques for the residents in the locality, notable churches being Maranatha Church, Christ Church, C.S.I. Church and Ascension Church, temples being Gangai Amman Kovil and Shiva Vishnu Kovil, and mosques being Kodambakkam Mosque, HGWC Choolaimedu Islamic Centre situated in Abdullah Street, Choolaimedu Mosque and Sowrashtra Nagar 10th Street Mosque in Choolaimedu.

The Nungambakkam Railway subway was one of the few 4-lane railway subways in Chennai at the time it was opened in the early 1980s.

Notable schools include Government Boys School, Jaigopal Garodia Government Girls Higher Sec School, TTA Matric, DAV School, LM Dadha Senior Secondary School, Kendriya Vidyalaya, and Ponnammal Vidyalaya.

Notable companies like HDFC and HCL have their BPO centres here.

Public parks include Gill Nagar Park and a park maintained by Chennai Corporation near Nungambakkam Railway Station.

== Neighborhoods ==
- Aminjikarai
- Arumbakkam
- Chetput
- Kilpauk
- Kodambakkam
- Koyambedu
- MMDA Colony
- Nungambakkam
- Vadapalani
