= Chennai Park railway station =

Railway station in Tamil Nadu, India

Chennai Park Poonga
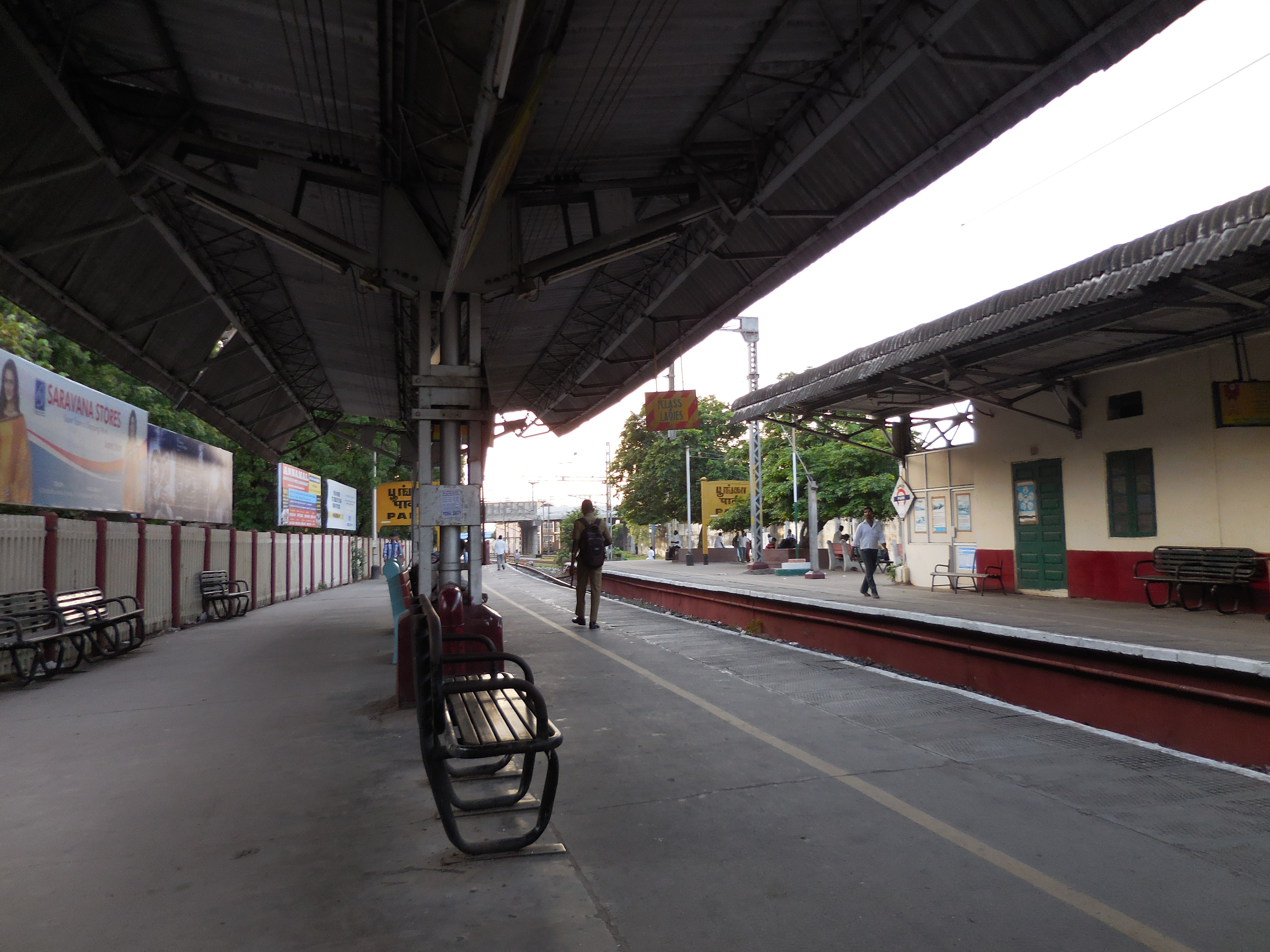
- Chennai Park railway station (a view towards east)

General information
- Other names: Chennai Park
- Location: NH 4, Periyamet, Chennai, Tamil Nadu, India
- Coordinates: 13°4′49″N 80°16′22″E
- System: Indian Railways, Chennai Suburban Railway and Chennai MRTS station
- Owner: Ministry of Railways, Indian Railways
- Lines: South and South West lines of Chennai Suburban Railway
- Platforms: 3
- Tracks: 3

Construction
- Structure type: Standard on-ground station
- Parking: Available

Other information
- Status: Active
- Station code: MPK
- Fare zone: Southern Railways

History
- Former names: South Indian Railway

Passengers
- 440,000/day (as per 2012)
Location
- Location within Chennai Location within Tamil Nadu Location within India

Chennai Park railway station (or just Park station) is one of the railway stations in Chennai, India, on the Chennai Beach–Chengelpet section of the Chennai Suburban Railway Network. It serves the neighbourhood of Park Town, a suburb of Chennai. It is located at about 3 km from Chennai Beach terminus and is situated on Poonamallee High Road, across Chennai Central railway station. It has an elevation of 7 m above sea level.

== History ==
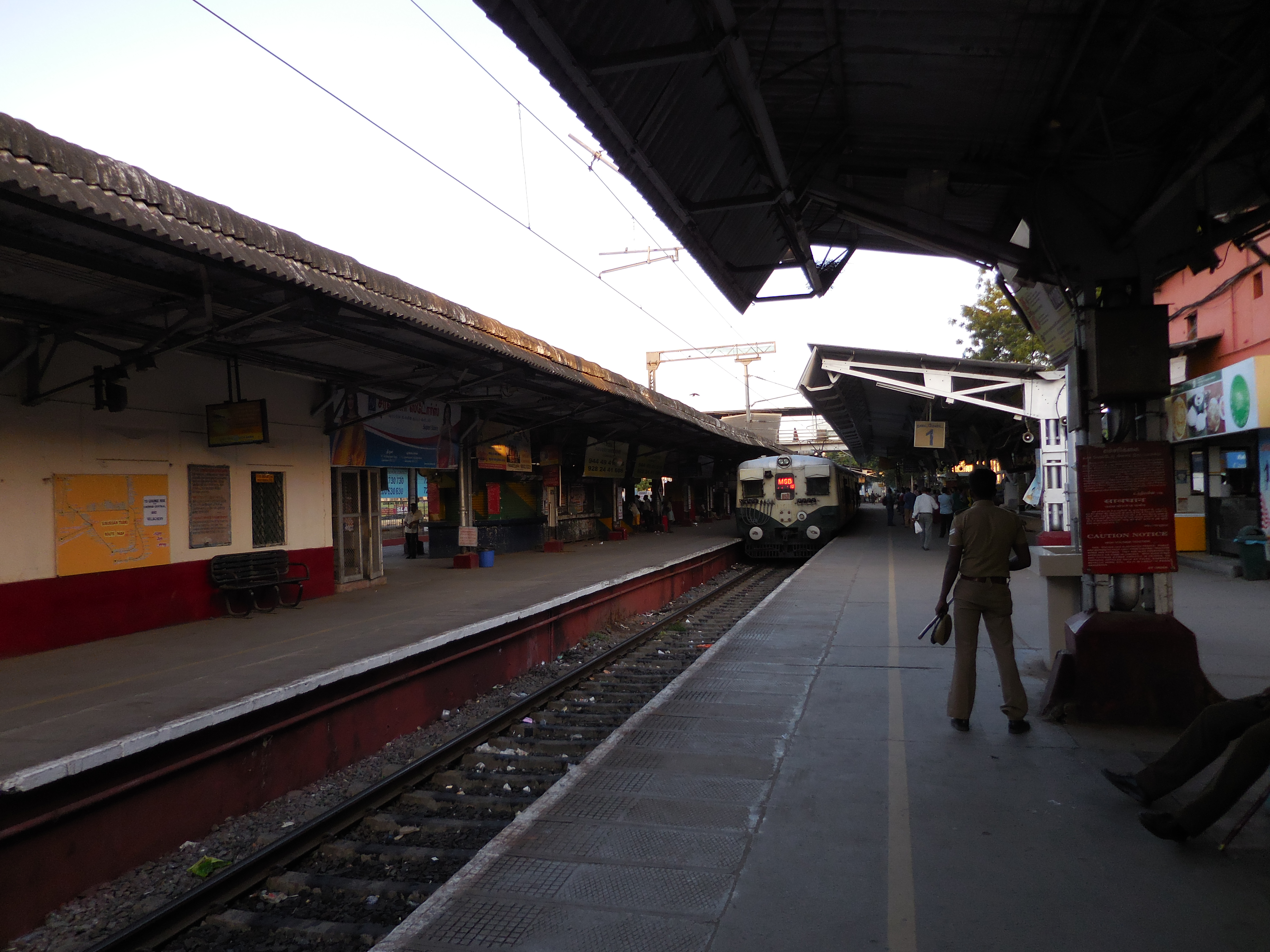
A suburban train to Chennai Beach arriving on Platform 1 at the station

The station lies in the Chennai Beach–Tambaram section of the Chennai Suburban Railway Network, the first suburban section of the city. With the completion of track-lying work in March 1931, which began in 1928, the suburban services were started on 11 May 1931 between Beach and Tambaram, and was electrified on 15 November 1931, with the first MG EMU services running on 1.5 kV DC. The section was converted to 25 kV AC traction on 15 January 1967.

== Traffic ==
As of 2012, the station handles about 440,000 passengers a day.

== Projects and development ==
It is one of the 73 stations in Tamil Nadu to be named for upgradation under Amrit Bharat Station Scheme of Indian Railways.

== See also ==
- Chennai Suburban Railway
- Railway stations in Chennai
