= Chennai Central metro station =

Metro station in Chennai, India

Puratchi Thalaivar Dr. M.G. Ramachandran Central Metro Station

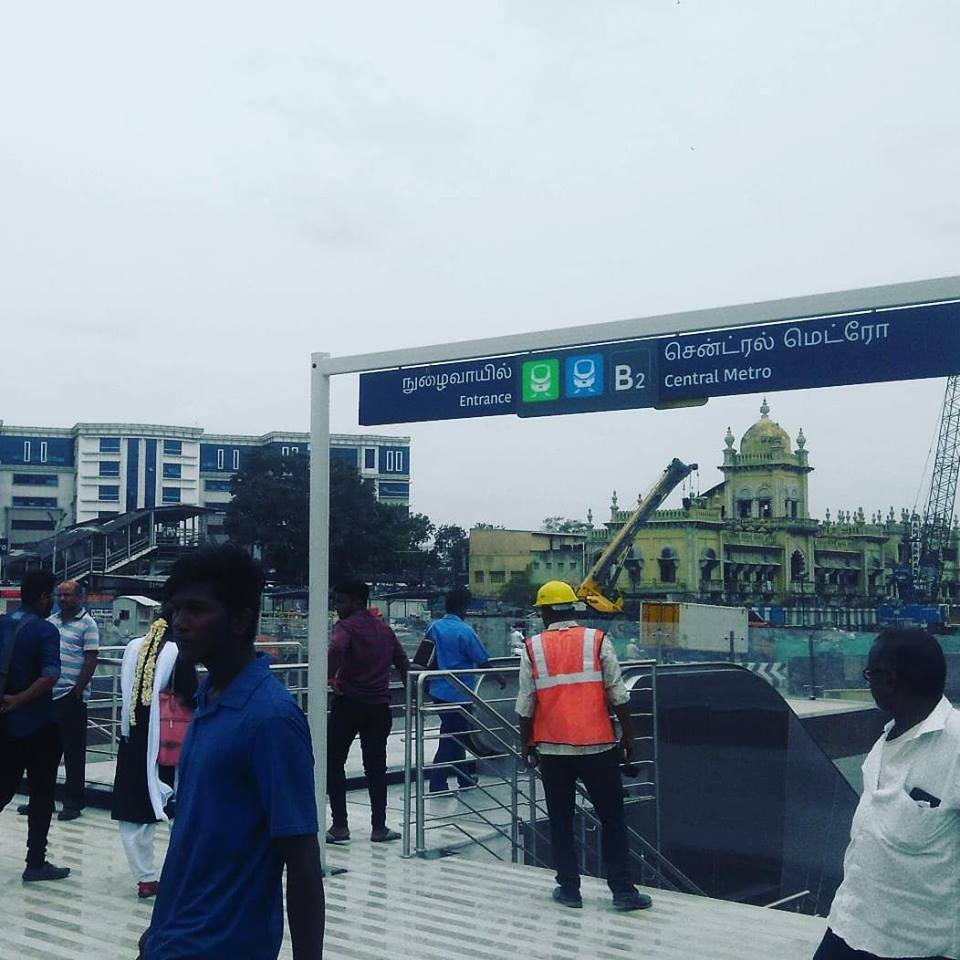
- Entrance of the station

General information
- Other names: MGR Central Metro / Chennai Central Metro/ Central Metro
- Location: Kannappar Thidal, Poongavanapuram, Chennai – 600003, Tamil Nadu, India
- Coordinates: 13.081464°N 80.272752°E
- System: Chennai Metro station
- Owner: Chennai Metro Rail Limited
- Operator: Chennai Metro Rail Limited
- Line: Blue Line Green Line Inter Corridor Line
- Platforms: Island platform Platform-1 to 4 → St. Thomas Mount; Platform-5 → Chennai International Airport (to be extended to Kilambakkam in the future); Platform-6 → Wimco Nagar Depot
- Tracks: 6
- Connections: Chennai Central; Suburban rail: Chennai Park, Moore Market Complex; MRTS: Park Town

Construction
- Structure type: Underground, 3x double track
- Depth: 28 metres (92 ft)
- Platform levels: 3
- Parking: available
- Cycle facilities: Free bicycle available
- Accessible: Yes

Other information
- Station code: SCC
- Website: http://chennaimetrorail.org

History
- Opened: 25 May 2018; 8 years ago (Green Line); 10 February 2019; 7 years ago (Blue Line)
- Electrified: 2x single-phase 25 kV 50 Hz AC overhead catenary

Passengers
- 2019: 10,500
- Rank: 2

Services
Preceding station	Chennai Metro	Following station
High Court towards Wimco Nagar Depot	Blue Line	Government Estate towards Chennai International Airport
High Court towards Wimco Nagar Depot	Blue Line (future service)	Government Estate towards Kilambakkam
Terminus	Green Line	Egmore towards St. Thomas Mount
Route map
Location

Chennai Central Metro, officially known as Puratchi Thalaivar Dr. M.G. Ramachandran Central metro station, is an underground metro station on the North-South Corridor of the Blue Line and Green Line of Chennai Metro in Chennai, India. Central metro station is spread over an area of 30,000 square metres (320,000 sq ft). On 31 July 2020, it was named by Government of Tamil Nadu as Puratchi Thalaivar Dr. M.G. Ramachandran Central Metro to honor the All India Anna Dravida Munnetra Kazhagam founder and the former Chief Minister of Tamil Nadu M. G. Ramachandran.

== About ==
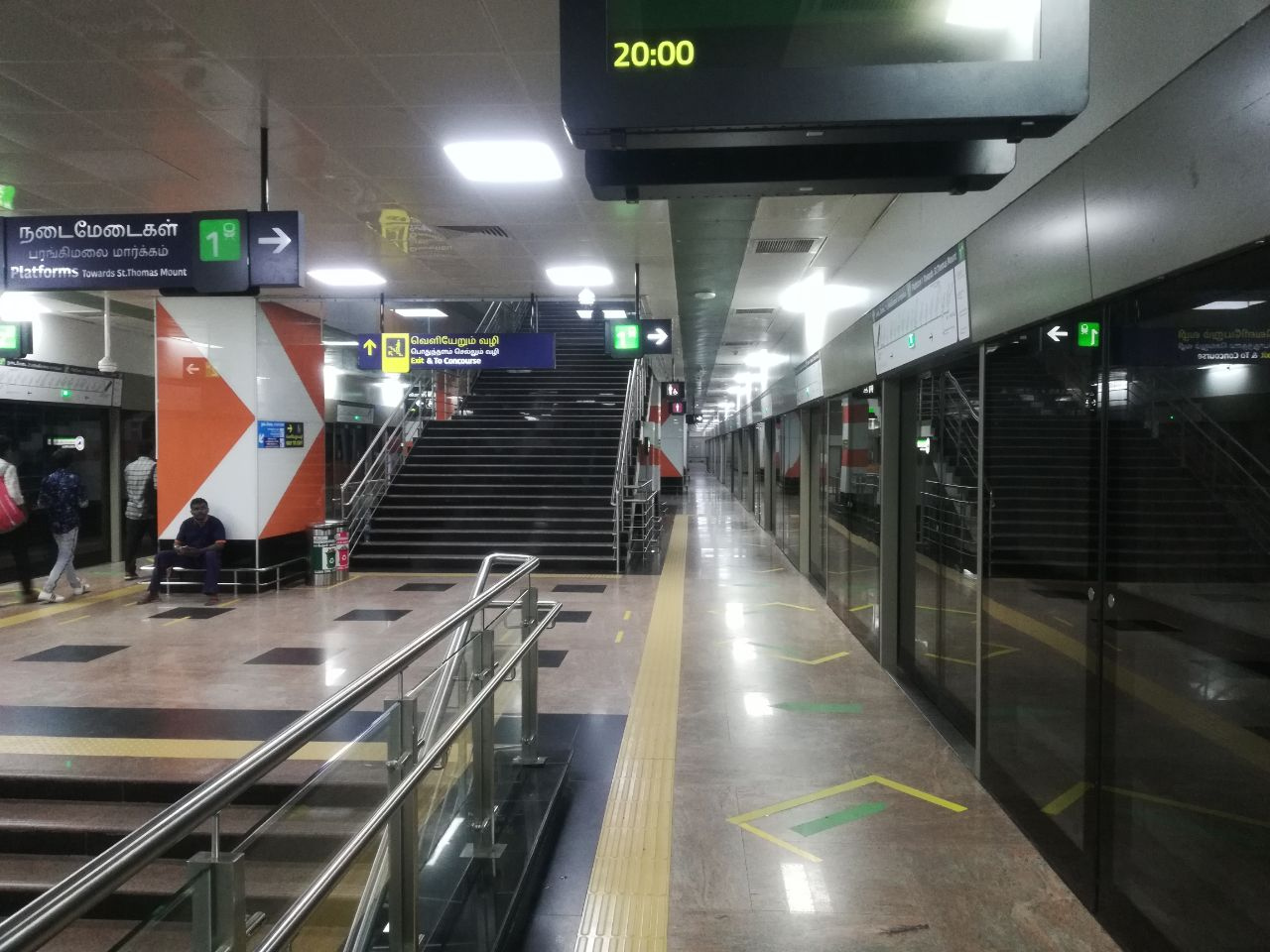
Central Metro Station Chennai

The station is an underground, two-level station on Poonamallee High Road in front of the Chennai Central railway station and the Ripon Building. The station is one of the two metro stations where Corridor I (Airport–Wimco Nagar) of the project will intersect with Corridor II (Chennai Central Metro–St Thomas Mount via Egmore and CMBT Metro), the other being the Alandur metro station. The metro station, being constructed at a depth of 28 m (92 ft), will be the largest of all metro stations in the city, with an area of over 30,000 m^{2} (320,000 sq ft). The three-level metro station will cover a length of 410 metres and will have a width of 35 metres. Unlike the other metro stations which have four entry points, the Chennai Central Railway Station will have six entry/exit points for access to Park suburban and Park Town MRTS stations, Ripon Building, Rajiv Gandhi Government General Hospital, and Chennai Central railway station. The station will act as a transit point for passengers from the Chennai Central railway station, Park Town, and Park railway stations. It is estimated that more than 100,000 commuters will use the station daily.

The station is one of the few in the corridor that will have parking facilities. Space will be allocated for parking in a basement area for about 500 cars and 1,000 two-wheelers. There are also plans to have the airport check-in facility in one of the basement levels at the station, which will allow air passengers to complete the check-in procedures at the station itself. A bus bay has also been planned opposite the station.

This is one of the three stations in the Chennai Metro Rail network that will have 230-kV receiving sub-stations for power supply from the state's electricity grid. The other two are Koyambedu and Arignar Anna Alandur Metro.

The station was opened on 25 May 2018. As of December 2019, the station had a daily footfall of about 9,500 passengers, up from about 7,700 in February 2019, making it the second busiest metro station in the city after Thirumangalam.

Platform 1 is for St. Thomas Mount & Airport Metro(via Koyambedu, CMBT, Vadapalani and Ashok Nagar)

Platform 2 is for Airport during peak hours(via Koyambedu, Vadapalani, Ashok Nagar)

Platform 5 is for Airport in the Blue Line(via Thousand Lights, AG-DMS and Guindy)

Platform 6 is for Wimco Nagar Depot (via High Court, Washermenpet and Tiruvottiyur)

== Station layout ==
G	Street level	Exit / entrance
M	Mezzanine	Fare control, station agent
B1	Platform 1 Westbound	Towards ← St. Thomas Mount & Chennai International Airport; Next station: Chennai Egmore
B1	Island platform | Doors will open on the right
B1	Platform 2 Eastbound	Towards ← St. Thomas Mount & Chennai International Airport; Next station: Chennai Egmore
B2	Platform 3 Westbound	Towards ← St. Thomas Mount; Next station: Chennai Egmore
B2	Island platform | Doors will open on the right
B2	Platform 4 Eastbound	Towards ← St. Thomas Mount; Next station: Chennai Egmore
B3	Platform 5 Southbound	Towards → Chennai International Airport; Next station: Government Estate (to be further extended to Kilambakkam in the future)
B3	Island platform | Doors will open on the right
B3	Platform 6 Northbound	Towards ← Wimco Nagar Depot; Next station: High Court

== Landscape ==
The Chennai Corporation has plans to develop a park over the Chennai Central Metro. Chennai Metro Rail Limited has agreed to a proposal by the Chennai Corporation of extending the Ripon Buildings Park over the Chennai Central underground metro station. Waterproof structures will be created over the station to facilitate the creation of the park. A portion of the park, which will cover more than six acres of the premises of Ripon Buildings and Victoria Public Hall, will be developed on a waterproof concrete slab area, measuring 210 metres by 10 metres. Visitors to the Ripon Buildings Park, Amma Maaligai and Victoria Public Hall will have access to the Chennai Central Metro through some of its seven entry points.

== See also ==
- List of Chennai metro stations
- Railway stations in Chennai
- Rajiv Chowk metro station
