= St. Thomas Mount railway station =

Railway station in Chennai, India

St. Thomas Mount Parangimalai
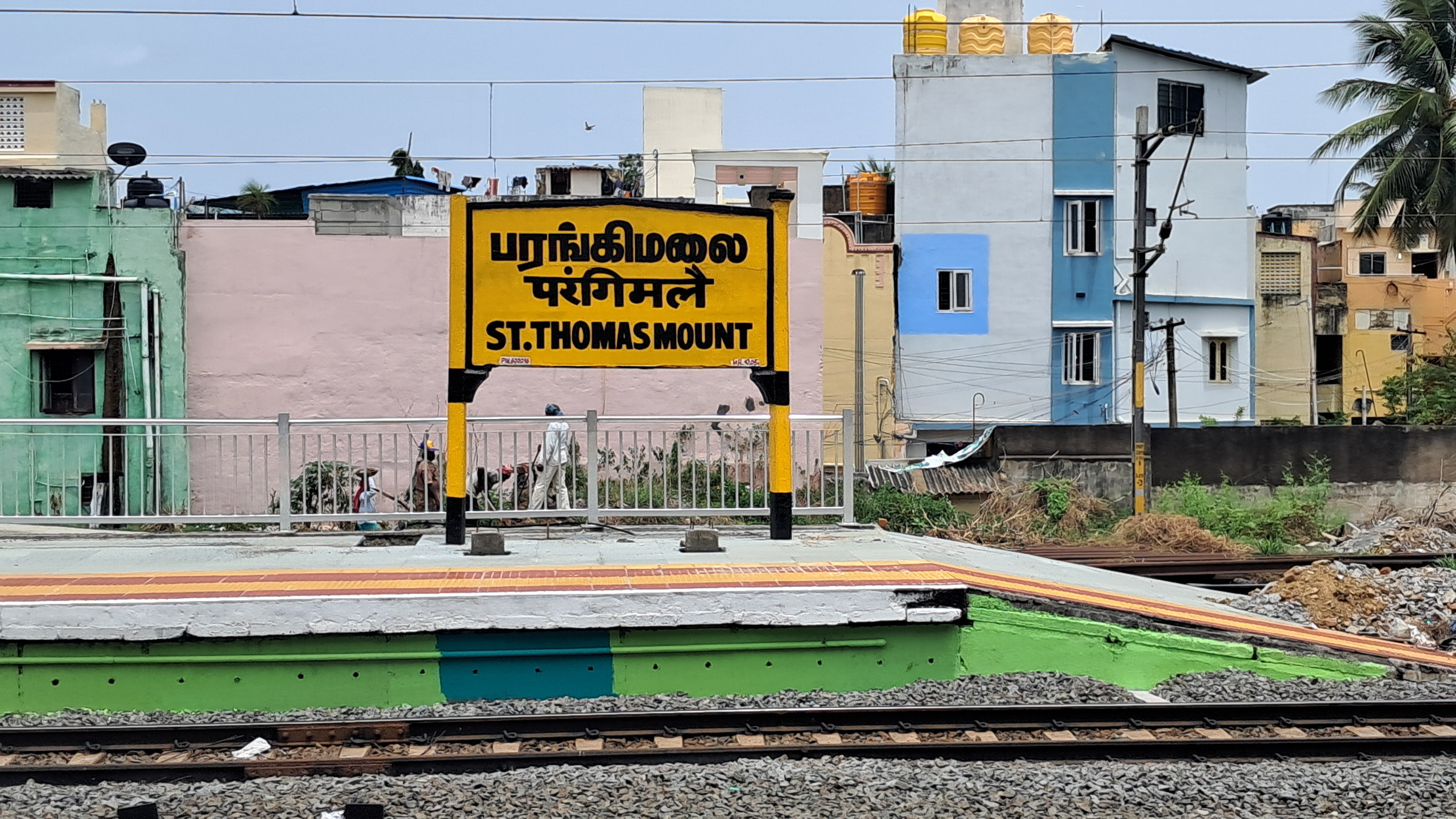
- St. Thomas Mount railway station as of June 2025

General information
- Location: GST Road, St. Thomas Mount, Chennai, Tamil Nadu, India
- Coordinates: 12°59′41″N 80°11′56″E
- System: Indian Railways, Chennai Suburban Railway and Chennai MRTS station
- Owner: Ministry of Railways, Indian Railways
- Lines: South and South West lines of Chennai Suburban Railway
- Platforms: 5
- Tracks: 4
- Connections: Green Line Red Line; St. Thomas Mount

Construction
- Structure type: Standard on-ground station (Railway station) Elevated station (Chennai MRTS and Chennai Metro)
- Parking: Available

Other information
- Status: Active
- Station code: STM
- Fare zone: Southern Railways

History
- Opened: 14 March 2026; 6 months ago (MRTS station)
- Former names: South Indian Railway

Services
Preceding station	Chennai MRTS	Following station
Adambakkam towards Chennai Beach	Line 1	Terminus
Preceding station	Chennai Suburban	Following station
Guindy towards Chennai Beach	South Line	Pazhavanthangal towards Tambaram, Chengalpattu Junction or Villupuram Junction
Route map
Chennai Beach — Villupuram
Location

St. Thomas Mount railway station, locally known as Mount railway station or Parangimalai station, is one of the railway stations of the Chennai Beach–Chengalpattu section of the Chennai Suburban Railway Network. It serves the neighbourhood of St. Thomas Mount and Pazhavanthangal, which are suburbs of Chennai. It is located at a distance of 17 km (11 mi) from Chennai Beach terminus, with an elevation of 11 m (36 ft) above sea level.

The station is also an integrated railway station for all the three modes of rail transport in the city, namely, Chennai suburban railway, MRTS, and Metro Rail. The MRTS part was opened for public on 14 March 2026.

== Integrated Terminus ==
St. Thomas Mount
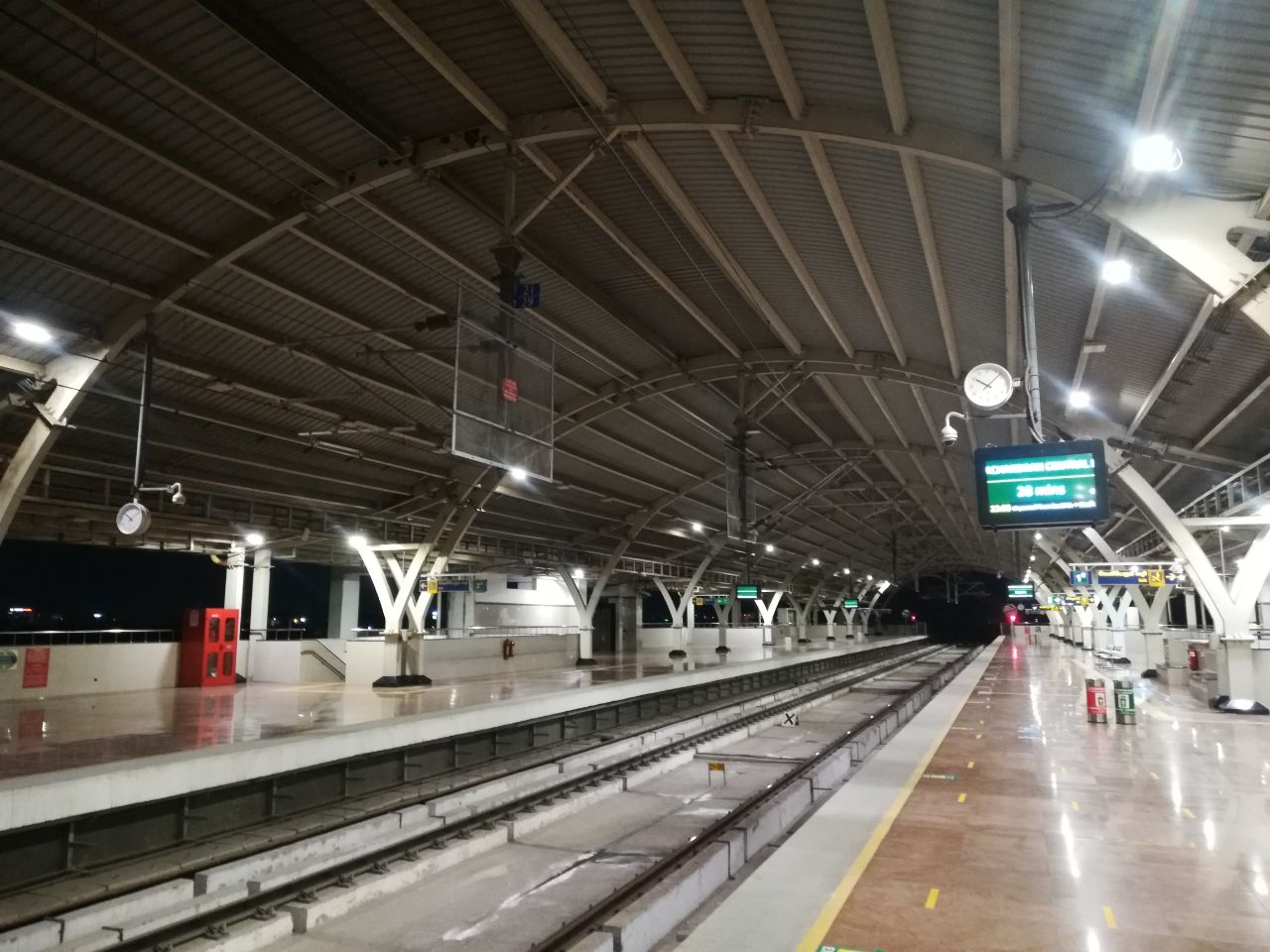
- St. Thomas Mount metro station

General information
- System: Chennai Metro station
- Line: Green Line Red Line
- Platforms: Side platform Platform-1 → Train Terminates Here; Platform-2 → M.G.R Chennai Central Side platform Platform-3 → Sholinganallur Platform-4 → Madhavaram Milk Colony /Pattabiram
- Tracks: 4

Construction
- Structure type: Elevated
- Platform levels: 1

Other information
- Station code: SMM

History
- Opened: 14 October 2016; 9 years ago
- Electrified: Single-phase 25 kV 50 Hz AC overhead catenary

Services
Preceding station	Chennai Metro	Following station
Alandur towards Chennai Central	Green Line	Terminus
Alandur towards Madhavaram Milk Colony	Red Line (Under Construction)	Adambakkam towards Sholinganallur
Alandur towards Pattabiram	Red Line (Future service)	Adambakkam towards Sholinganallur
Route map
Location

St. Thomas Mount Metro station is a Metro-cum-MRTS railway station on the Green Line of the Chennai Metro. The station is an elevated station abutting the surface-level St. Thomas Mount suburban station of the Chennai Suburban Railway Network. The metro level of the station started functioning on 14 October 2016 while the MRTS level is set to open on 14 March 2026.

The new terminal is envisaged as an integrated railway station for all the three modes of rail transport in the city, namely, Chennai Beach—Chengalpattu section of the Chennai Suburban Railway, terminal point of Chennai Beach—St. Thomas Mount MRTS, and Chennai Central–St. Thomas Mount Metro Rail.

=== Layout ===
The station will include access to all the 3 suburban rail modes of the city, at multiple levels. The integrated station will have three levels, namely, ground level for suburban station, level 1 for MRTS, and level 2 for Metro Rail. The length of the platform at the Metro station will be 140 m and the entire station complex will have a total built-up area of 48,000 sq m.

==== Level-0 – New suburban rail platform ====
The existing suburban station at ground level can be accessed from new terminal using a foot overbridge.

As per the new design, the elevated station will have a Metro Rail station on the top floor, followed by an MRTS station a level below and then a vast concourse area for commuters to switch over to these two modes or to step down to the ground level, which will house – new ground level platform – for suburban trains, within the new Station block.

===== Station layout (Indian Suburban Railways) =====
G	Street level	Exit/Entrance & ticket counter
P1	FOB, Side platform | Doors will open on the left
P1	Platform 1	Towards → Chennai Beach; Next Station: Guindy
P1	FOB, Island platform | P1 Doors will open on the left/right | P2 Doors will open on the right
P1	Platform 2	Towards ← Tambaram / Chengalpattu Jn / Villuppuram Jn; Next Station: Pazhavanthangal
P1	Platform 3	Towards → Chennai Egmore
P1	FOB, Island platform | P3 and P4 | (Express Line)
P1	Platform 4	Towards ← Chengalpattu Junction
P1

==== Level-1 – Concourse for mixing of Passengers ====
The concourse will have ticket booths and escalators and lifts will take commuters to the platforms above.

==== Level-2 – MRTS rail ====
The MRTS will be at a height of 12 m.

===== Station Layout (MRTS) =====
G	Street level	Exit/Entrance
L1	Mezzanine	Fare control, Station ticket counters and Automatic ticket vending machines
L2	Side platform | Doors will open on the left
L2	Platform 2 Eastbound	Train terminates here
L2	Platform 1 Southbound	Towards ← Chennai Beach; Next Station: Adambakkam
L2	Side platform | Doors will open on the left
L2

==== Level-3 – Metro rail ====
The station is among the elevated stations along Green Line of the Chennai Metro: Chennai Central–St. Thomas Mount stretch. The station will be the tallest of elevated stations of the Chennai Metro, coming up at a height of 23 m.

===== Station Layout (Metro) =====
G	Street Level	Exit/Entrance
L1	Mezzanine	Fare control, station agent, Metro Card vending machines, crossover
L2	Side platform | Doors will open on the left
L2	Platform 2 Northbound	Towards → Chennai Central; Next Station: Arignar Anna Alandur Change at the next station for Blue Line
L2	Platform 1 Southbound	Towards ← Train Terminates Here
L2	Side platform | Doors will open on the left
L3	Side platform | Doors will open on the left
L3	Platform 3 Southbound	Towards → Sholinganallur; Next Station: Adambakkam
L3	Platform 4 Northbound	Towards ← Madhavaram Milk Colony / Pattabiram; Next Station: Alandur
L3	Side platform | Doors will open on the left

== History ==
The station lies in the Chennai Beach–Tambaram section of the Chennai Suburban Railway Network, the first suburban section of the city. With the completion of track-lying work in March 1931, which began in 1928, the suburban services were started on 11 May 1931 between Beach and Tambaram, and was electrified on 15 November 1931, with the first MG EMU services running on 1.5 kV DC. The section was converted to 25 kV AC traction on 15 January 1967.

As of 2012, an integrated terminal for Chennai Metro and MRTS is under construction at the station complex at a cost of ₹ 780 million. The construction is expected to be completed by September 2013. The ₹ 780-million contract for the construction of the station was initially awarded to Consolidated Construction Consortium Limited (CCCL). However, owing to delay the contract was terminated and is being given to a new contractor.

== Projects and Upgradation ==
As of 2023, the station had a footfall of 30,000 passengers a day. The task of upgrading of St. Thomas Mount station alongwith 72 other stations in Tamil Nadu, was taken up in 2023 under Indian Railway's Amrit Bharat Station Scheme at a cost of ₹ 141.5 million and was inaugurated on 23 May 2025.

== Future ==
With the integration of five modes of public transport – suburban railway, Southern Railway, Metro Rail, MRTS and public buses the station is expected to become the city's largest transit hub after Chennai Central.

=== Access Roads ===
A two-lane circular road has also been planned around the station so that buses can pick up commuters. Anticipating increased patronage upon the completion of Metro Rail, the Medavakkam-Madipakkam road that runs in front of the station is being widened. It is expected that MRTS and metro rail services will together bring in more than 100,000 commuters at the station.

=== Parking ===
Parking facility include 10,000 sq m space at the ground level and provisions for 3,000 two-wheelers at level 1. Upon completion, the station will be the third largest in the city after Chennai Central and Chennai Egmore.

=== Express Train halt ===
In June 2013, Southern Railway started the ground work to extend platforms at the station to halt express trains. A spare platform of the station, which is being used to park old rakes, is being extended at an estimated cost of ₹ 60 million. The platform, which can currently take only 22-coach trains, will be expanded to handle 24-rake trains and a link track will be laid.

== See also ==
- Railway stations in Chennai
- List of Chennai metro stations
- Chennai Suburban Railway
- Chennai Metro
