= Okkiam Maduvu =

Coordinates: 12°55′22″N 80°14′34″E

Okkiam Maduvu or Okkiyam Maduvu or Oggiyam Maduvu is a 2.8-kilometer-long water channel situated in Kanchipuram district located in southern suburbs of the city of Chennai, India. It gets water from the Pallikaranai Wetland and drains into the Buckingham canal.

== Origin and course ==
Okkiyam Maduvu originates as a narrow canal from the Pallikaranai marsh land and travels eastwards towards Old Mahabhalipuram Road near Karapakkam. It then passes through a few Chennai suburbs like Okkiampet, Okkiam Thuraipakkam, Kannagi Nagar and then drains into Buckingham Canal near Injambakkam through which it ultimately empties into the Bay of Bengal via Muttukadu lake which is around 16 kilometers from its origin.

Several Housing colonies like Kannagi Nagar, condominiums like Jains Pebble Brook, Nortels Prapancha and educational centers like KCG College of Technology, Shankara Matriculation School were developed in and around the course of the channel.

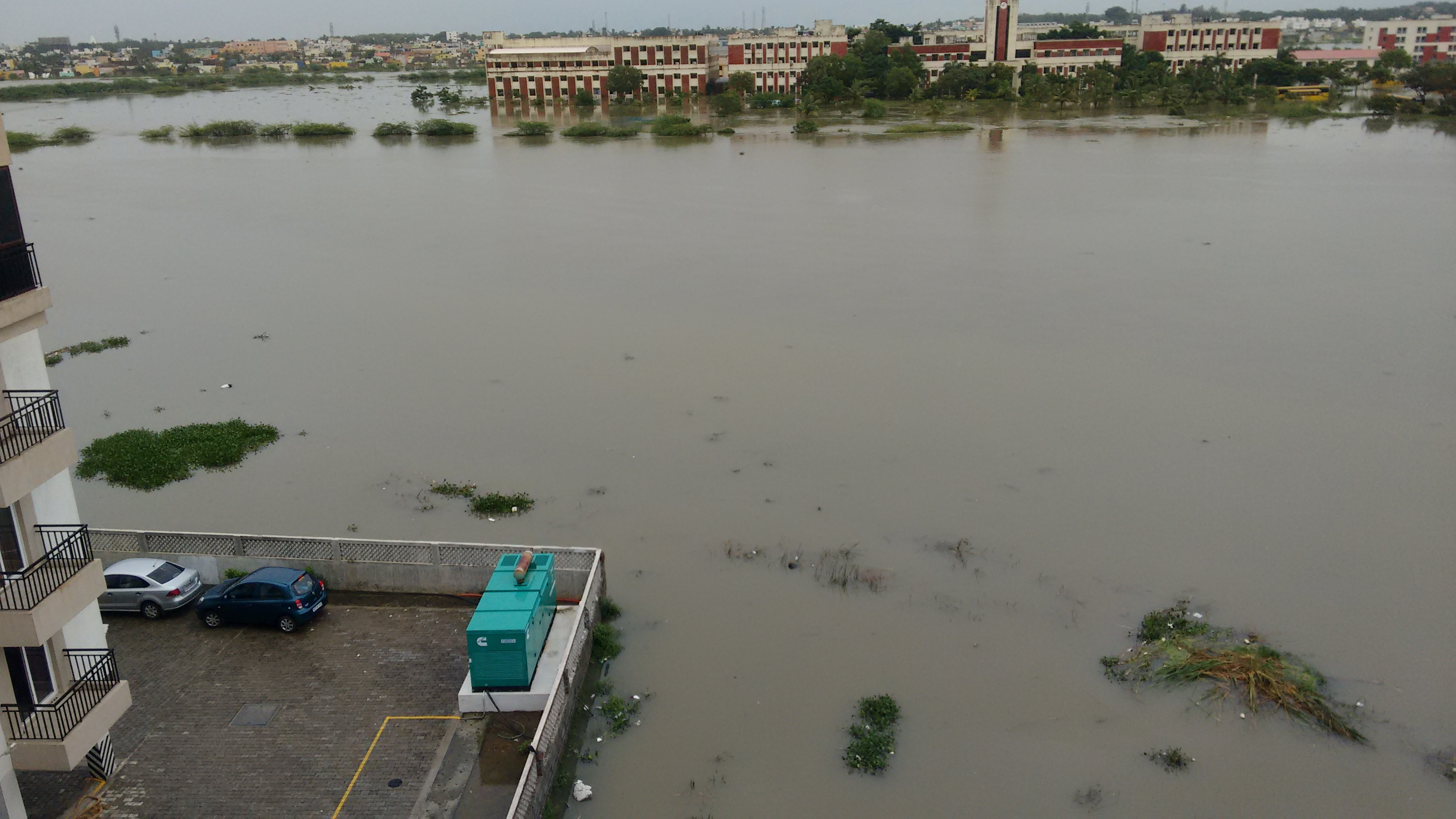
A scenic view of Okkiyam Maduvu

== 2015 Chennai flooding ==
The heavy rainfall during the annual northeast monsoon in November–December 2015 that lashed Chennai and Kancheepuram districts has resulted in the flooding of Okkiyam Maduvu. The flood waters from some of the suburbs of Chennai like Velachery, Pallikaranai, Medavakkam has drained into Pallikaranai Wetland and subsequently into Okkiyam Maduvu. Since the Buckingham Canal is already overflowing because of excess drainage from Adyar river, the outflow of flood waters from the Okkiyam Maduvu was slow and had to travel 16 kilometers long to reach the Bay of Bengal near Mutthukadu, and thereby resulting in submerging of a few roads and partial submerging of a few buildings surrounding the channel.

Flood Protection Scheme:

The Government of Tamil Nadu has emphasised the need to find a long-term solution to tackle the issue of flooding by ordering a detailed investigation to have a regulated canal (straight cut) direct to the sea from the Buckingham Canal area adjoining the Okkiyam Maduvu.
