= Murder of Praveen and Suicide of Sharmila =

2024 honor killing and suicide

Murder of Praveen
- Date: February 24, 2024
- Location: Pallikaranai, Chennai, Tamil Nadu, India
- Type: Murder, Honor killing
- Cause: Inter-caste marriage

The murder of Praveen took place in the South Indian state of Tamil Nadu. Praveen was murdered in an honor killing as he, a Dalit (an untouchable), had married Sharmila, an upper caste girl. The killing was done by Sharmila's brother Dinesh and his four friends. Sharmila committed suicide.

== Background ==
Sharmila, a final year college student, lived in Jalladiampet near Pallikaranai. Praveen waa a mechanic in his father's two-wheeler shop in Pallikaranai and lived on Ambedkar street in Pallikaranai.

Sharmila fell in love with Praveen and married him in October 2023 without the knowledge and consent of her parents. This angered her parents and brother.

== Murder ==
Dinesh, along with friends Stephen, Vishnuraj, Sriram, and Jothilingam hacked Praveen to death and fled. Police soon arrested all five of them.

== Suicide ==
Sharmila attempted suicide on April 14, 2024, and was admitted to Rajiv Gandhi Government General Hospital. She died on April 22, 2024. In her suicide note she wrote, "Wherever RC (Praveen) goes, I go. I don't want this life without him."
