= Pallikaranai =

- Neighbourhood
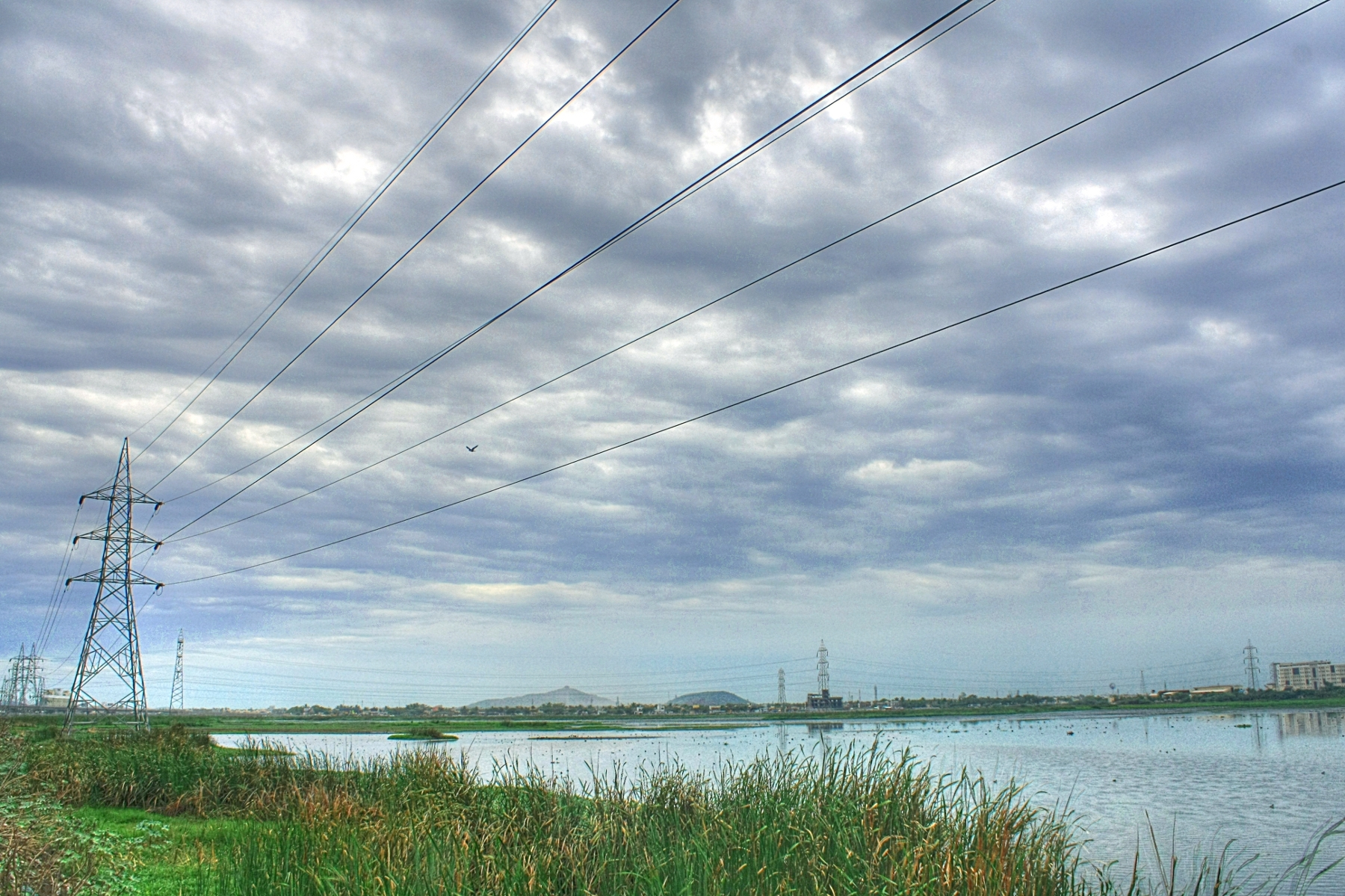
- Pallikaranai wet land.

- Pallikaranai (Tamil Nadu)
- Coordinates: 12.934900°N 80.213700°E
- Country: India
- State: Tamil Nadu
- District: Chennai
- Metro: Chennai
- Zone: Perungudi
- Ward: 189 & 190

Government
  - Type: Municipality
  - Body: Chennai Corporation
- Elevation: 28 m (92 ft)

Population (2011)
  - Total: 43,493

Languages
  - Official: Tamil
- Time zone: UTC+5:30 (IST)
- PIN: 600100
- Telephone code: 91-44
- Vehicle registration: TN-14
- Lok Sabha constituency: Chennai South
- Legislative Assembly constituency: Sholinganallur
- Website: http://www.tn.gov.in/ (Governmental)

Pallikaranai is a neighborhood and a residential area in south Chennai, Tamil Nadu, India. Located in proximity to the IT industry in Old Mahabalipuram Road, Chennai's central business districts and the automobile hub in GST road has attracted more population to Pallikaranai in the 2000s. Pallikaranai became a part of the Chennai Corporation in July 2011.

Pallikaranai place surrounded by various natural lands, water resources, ponds, lakes and different varieties of birds.

According to a 2012 report by global property consultant Knight Frank, the neighborhood has emerged as India's 11th largest destination for investment in the residential real estate, in the list of 13-top residential destinations in the country from an investment point of view, where housing prices are expected to increase by 93 percent over the period 2012–2017.

== Demographics ==
As of 2001 India census, Pallikaranai had a population of 22,503. Males constitute 52% of the population and females 48%. Pallikaranai has an average literacy rate of 74%, higher than the national average of 59.5%: male literacy is 80%, and female literacy is 67%. In Pallikaranai, 13% of the population is under 6 years of age. Pallikaranai area contains several water bodies and many lakes and is also the home for the reputed National Institute of Ocean Technology (NIOT), which is the real technical arm under Govt of India. This institute has developed In-house Desalination Plant at Kavaratti under Mr Robert Singh and Dr Kathiroli. There are also many temples, parks and schools. In July 2011, Pallikaranai was joined with the Corporation of Chennai. A central grant for sewage system construction in Pallikaranai is awarded to State Government of Tamil Nadu under JnNURM scheme for which the tender and construction is expected to complete by February 2013. The effectiveness of the new sewage scheme is still in question due to the substandard contract approvals and usage of low quality construction materials. Most of the streets report damages to the underground laid sewage clay pipes and soil sinking. Way back from the start of project in 2009, most of the street roads in Pallikaranai are damaged for laying sewage pipes and then left untarred causing inconvenience for transportation.

== Location ==
Pallikaranai is surrounded by Madipakkam in the northwest, Velachery in the north, Perungudi in the northeast, Kovilambakkam in the west, Thuraipakkam in the east, Nanmangalam in southwest, Medavakkam in the south and Karapakkam in the southeast on ECR. It is part of Chennai from year 2012 which has 3 wards, 189,190 and 191 under zone 14.

Ward 189 has Sree Balaji Dental college and Jerusalem Engineering College. ward 191 has Asan memorial college, St. Johns Memorial college, Bethotal School, Holley Bells in Saiganesh Nagar.

== Chennai monorail-Pallikaranai ==
The Chennai monorail, which is in planning stage is likely to have a station in Pallikaranai in the Velachery-Vandalur route

== Pallikaranai Marsh ==
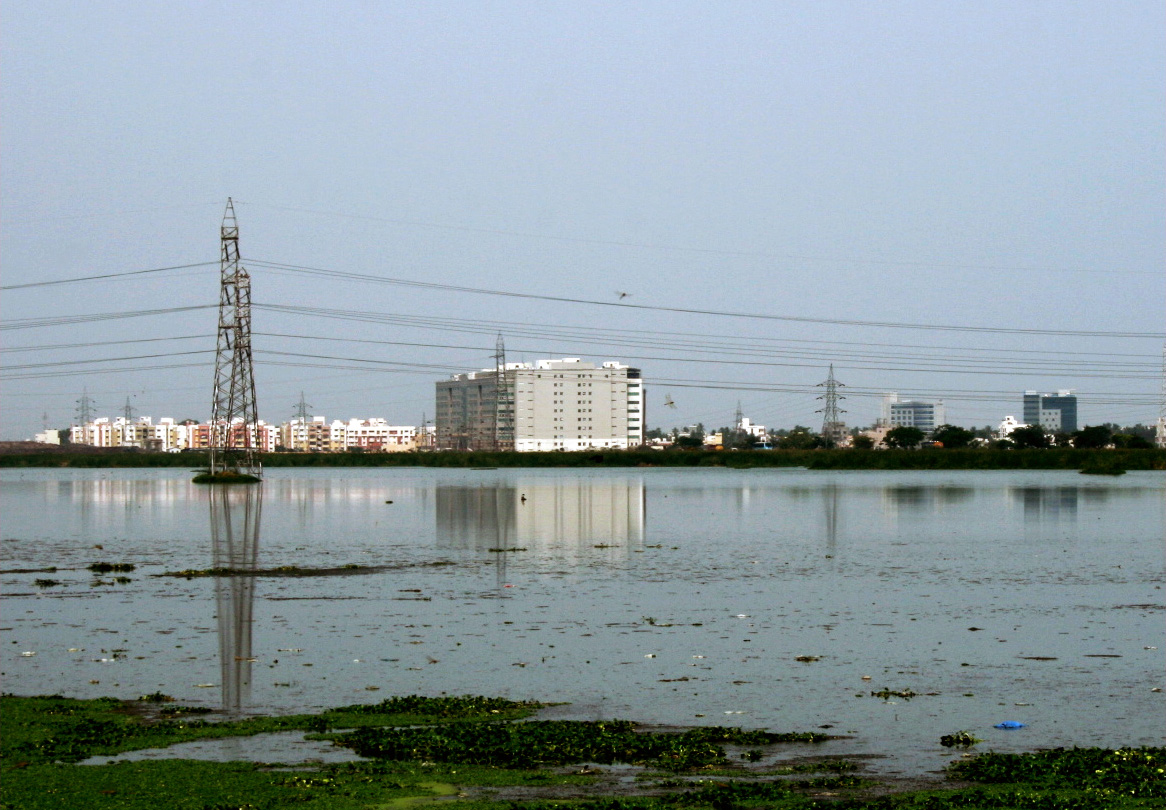
Pallikaranai Marsh

Pallikaranai wetland is a fresh water swamp adjacent to the Bay of Bengal situated in south Chennai with a geographical area of 80 km^{2}. In 2007, a major portion of the Pallikaranai marshland was declared a reserve forest area and brought under the Tambaram range of the Forest department. The swamp is helpful in charging the aquifers of the region. It is one of the last few remaining natural ecosystems in the city of Chennai. Pallikaranai is a vast, marshy area bounded by

-Velachery in north

-Medavakkam in south

-Kovilambakkam in west and

-Okkiyampettai Thuraipakkam in east

The swamp is helpful in charging the aquifers of the region. This blessing in fact has become a curse to the local residents. There are many unauthorized, private water supply companies like VVK, JK, RKS, Balaji water packaging etc., backed by politicians, counselor and government officials who pumps out gallons of water from wells and bores from the swamp surrounding like Ambal Nagar for commercial distribution within the city limits branding it as drinking water. The untreated water is being pumped out from abandoned wells filled with filth and then filled in tankers or cans for distribution. Many representations have been made by residents to officials like Chennai Mayor, CM, Kancheepuram Collector and even to local police for which no action has been taken so far. This unattended issue is causing many water borne diseases in the locality and deaths in Pallikaranai. See:

== Transportation ==
=== Air ===
The nearest airport of Pallikaranai is Chennai International Airport near Meenambakkam which is at a distance of ~13.5 km. The shortest way to reach Pallikaranai is by using the Velachery Main Road. The other two ways are to go via Pallavaram-Thoraipakkam Radial Road. MTC buses also ply on this route, but you have to break the journey and change buses.

=== Road ===
Roads on both the sides are largely encroached and sight of seeing cattle on roads is very common and there has been a lot of accidents happened and no action taken by corporation or police yet. Pallikaranai has connectivity to various parts of the city. There are two arterial roads: Velachery Main Road, connects Tambaram, Solinganallur and Pallavaram-Thoraipakkam Radial Road.

The Rs. 38.5 crore ROB in Tambaram completed in March 2009 and the Rs. 13.2 crore grade separator at Pallikaranai

The grade separator in Pallikaranai at the intersection of Velachery Main Road and Pallavaram - Thoraipakkam Radial Road has been completed and has helped in reducing traffic. The Minister would be taking part in a function in Tambaram on that day and he would lay the foundation for a road overbridge at Tambaram and for the Pallikaranai grade separator. While the bridge at Tambaram is estimated to cost Rs. 34 crore, Rs. 14 crore is to be spent on the Pallikaranai grade separator as on 2010. The State Highways Minister, Mr. Saminathan announced the construction of this project in February after an inspection of Pallikaranai, where work on minor bridges was in progress.

As per the design, vehicles towards Pallikaranai and Velachery would ply on the bridge, while motorists proceeding to Pallavaram and Thoraipakkam would be using the road beneath, according to senior engineers of the Highways Department.

=== CMDA master plan ===
There is CMDA master plan for to develop outer ring road 200 feet, medavakkam to karapakkam (OMR) via jalladianpet and pallikaranai. some of the area in pallikaranai, Sri Ganapathy Nagar (Syndicate) Colony, sai ganesh nagar, jaya anjaneyanagar and jalladianpet's area will be connected in this road to OMR.

https://web.archive.org/web/20120208092938/http://www.cmdamaps.tn.nic.in/ in this website, get map, of masterplan land use for pallikaranai, jalladianpettai,(st thomas mount taluka) karapakkam, medavakkam.

== Flora and fauna ==
The topography of the swamp is such that it always retains some storage, thus forming an aquatic ecosystem. It has been a home for naturally occurring plants (61 species), fish (50 species), birds (106 species), butterflies (7 species), reptiles (21 species) and some exotic floating vegetation such as water hyacinth and water lettuce, which are less extensive now and highly localized. Recent reports of the appearance of the white-spotted supple skink, for the first time in Tamil Nadu, and Russell's viper, the largest and the most widespread among Asian vipers, confirm its invaluable ecological status. Fish such as Dwarf gourami and Chromides that are widely bred and traded worldwide for aquaria, occur naturally in Pallikaranai. Besides, the Windowpane oyster, Mud crab, Mullet, Halfbeak and Green chromide are some of the estuarine fauna present in the marsh.

== Environment ==
Dumping of solid waste, discharge of sewage, construction of buildings, construction of a railway station and a new road to connect old Mahabhalipuram road and Pallavaram are causing the Pallikaranai marsh to shrink. Cognizant Chennai is located here now.

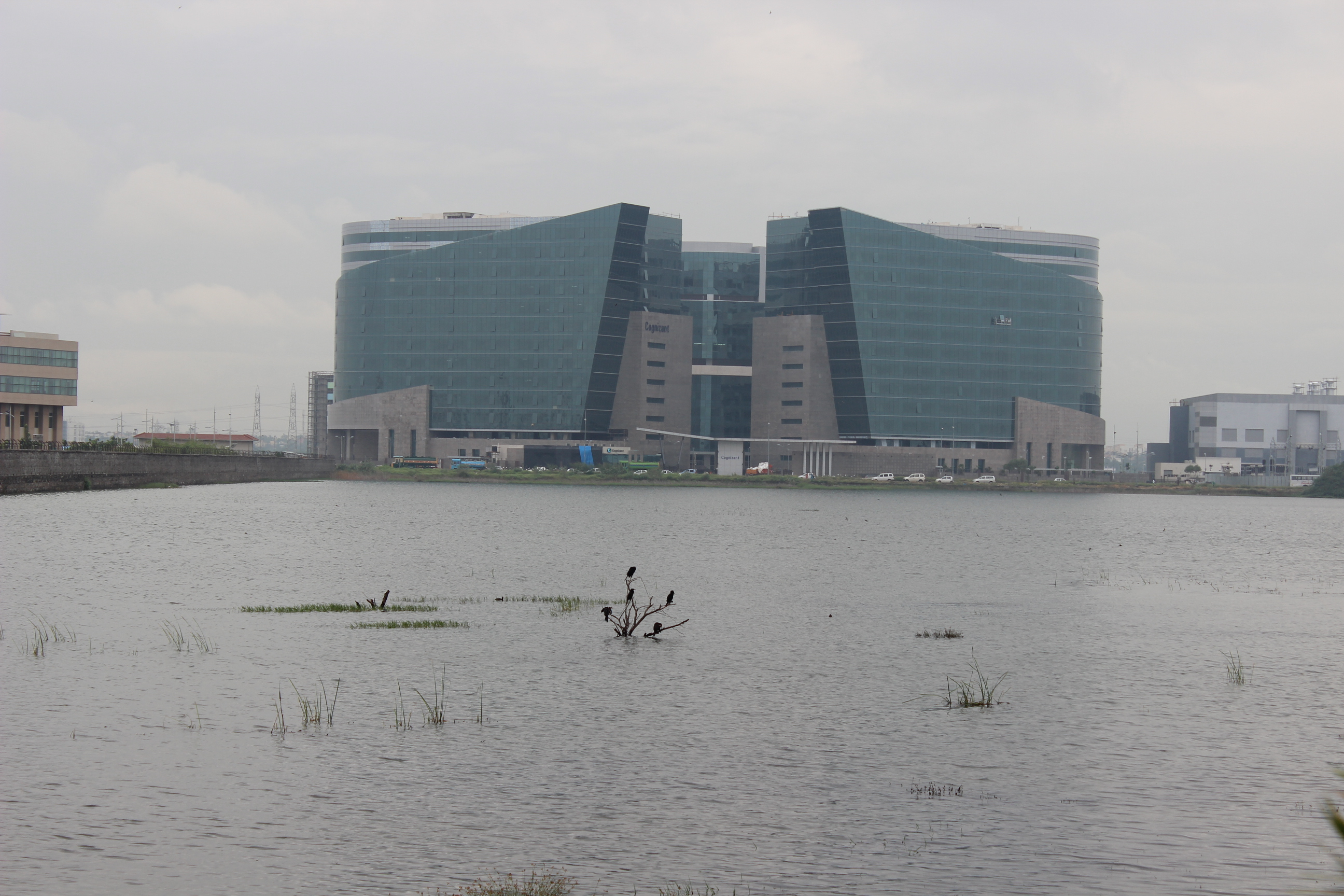
Cognizant at Pallikaranai

A major portion of the Pallikaranai marshland in south Chennai has been declared a reserve forest area and brought under the Tambaram range of the Forest department, according to a draft notification issued on 9 April 2007.

The notification says: "The proposal of the Principal Chief Conservator of Forests sent in his letter for publication of the notification under Section 4 of the Tamil Nadu Forest Act, 1882 is approved".

Senior department officials said a special tahsildar had been appointed to specify the boundaries and the extent of the marshland to be brought under their control. From now on, it would be known as `Pallikaranai Swamp Forest Block.'

They said 3.17 square kilometres (780 acres) of the marshland had been classified as reserve forest area.

Earlier, it was classified under the Revenue records of the Kancheepuram district administration. For several years, nature lovers, environmentalists and civic groups had been pressing for protecting the area, as it was a natural habitat with rich flora and fauna.

With the department taking over the marshland, it would be possible to take stringent action against trespassers and those dumping and burning garbage there, the officials said. Provisions of the Tamil Nadu Forest Act and Wildlife Protection Act could be invoked against them. Pallikaranai is the 17th reserve forest area in the Tambaram Range, whose reserve forest area goes up to 56.27 square kilometres (21.73 sq mi).

The Union Environment Ministry is considering the approval of an adaptive management plan for the Pallikaranai marshland.

== Famous temples ==
There are many famous temples in Pallikaranai, with visitors from all parts of the city. Arulmigu Annai Adhiparasakthi Temple / Mandira Paavai Temple https://web.archive.org/web/20101007085846/http://omgaarasakthi.org/, Senghazlini amman temple, Sri Nagathamman Kovil, Lakshmi Narayana Perumal temple, Muthumari amman Koil, veerathaman Koil and Sivan Koil are some of the oldest temples found here.

== Economy ==
Pallikaranai is home to many BPO and IT/ITES companies. Many mid-size IT companies and MNCs are located here, including Future Works, Hexawave, Jasmine Tech, Paragon,Shell India and Kaladi.PSU's like BHEL ( Bharat Heavy Electricals Ltd) and HLL Lifecare are also located here.

== Hospitals ==
Dr. Kamakshi Memorial Hospital is one of the Tertiary Care Hospital in Pallikaranai and V-Cure Hospital is located opposite to Pallikaranai police station (high school), Avs Hospital near to Pallikaranai police station (high school) and Global Hospitals 6.3 km on to Perumbakkam sholinganallur Road.

== Colleges and research centres ==
=== Jerusalem Engineering College ===
Jerusalem Educational Trust was formed in 1993 as a charitable trust, with an objective of promoting higher education in India in the fields of engineering and technology, medicine, dentistry and paramedical works as well as arts, science, commerce and physical education.

=== Sree Balaji Dental College ===
Sree Balaji Dental College (approved by Dental Council of India and Ministry of Health & Family Welfare, Govt. of India, New Delhi and affiliated to Bharath University, Chennai) with its hospital complex is situated at Pallikaranai, a suburban landscape on the Velechery Main road, Chennai, easily accessible by road either from Saidapet or Tambaram. A very prominent center of Dental care in the city of Chennai, it has all the amenities and facilities to give treatment to its patients. It has since emerged as a center of Dental care attracting multitudes of patients every day. It offers both undergraduate and post-graduate courses of all specialties.

=== Asan Memorial College of Arts & Science ===
The Asan Memorial College of Arts & Science was established in 1994. It is a co-educational institution of repute which offers courses in Arts, Science, Commerce, Business Administration and Hotel Management. The college was formally inaugurated by His Excellency K.R. Narayanan, the Honourable Vice President of India in December 1994.

It is a co-educational institution of repute which offers courses in arts, science, commerce, business administration and hotel management. The college was formally inaugurated by His Excellency K.R. Narayanan, the Honourable Vice President of India in December 1994.

http://www.asaneducation.com/

=== National Institute of Ocean Technology (NIOT) ===
The National Institute of Ocean Technology (NIOT) was established in November 1993 as an autonomous society under the Ministry of Earth Sciences, Government of India. NIOT is managed by a Governing Council and the director is the head of the institute.

The major aim of starting NIOT under the Ministry of Earth Sciences, is to develop reliable indigenous technology to solve the various engineering problems associated with harvesting of non-living and living resources in the Indian Exclusive Economic Zone (EEZ), which is about two-thirds of the land area of India.
