= K. M. Venkatramaiah =

Tamil and saivaite scholar

K. M. Venkatramaiah (April 4, 1912 – January 31, 1994) was a Tamil and saivaite scholar.

== Early life ==
He was born in Karapakkam near Poonamallee. His mother tongue was Telugu. Because of his interest in Tamil he pass B.O.L in Tamil. He completed masters in English.

== Career ==
Hearing one of his Tamil lectures he was offered the post of Principal at Tirupanandal College run by Thiruppanandal Adheenam. In 1981 he was head of the Department in Tamil University in Thanjavur. Later he worked at Dravidian Linguistics Association. Though he was born in Vaishnava family he was having subject knowledge in shaivism. During the 2012 All India conference of Dravidian linguists, a prize was announced in the name of K.M. Venkatramaiah with Rupees 3000/- as cash prize.

== Works ==
He has written many books in Tamil and English. His works were nationalised by the Government of Tamil Nadu by paying fifteen lakhs as compensation to his heirs.

== Last days ==
On January 31, 1994, he met with an accident and was taken to hospital but died on that day. His son M. V. Pasupathi is also a Tamil Scholar and professor in Tamil.
