= State Highway 109 (Tamil Nadu) =

Road in Tamil Nadu, India

State Highway 109

Location
- Country: India
- State: Tamil Nadu

Highway system
- Roads in India; Expressways; National; State; Asian; State Highways in Tamil Nadu

Tamil Nadu State Highway 109 (SH-109) connects Pallavaram to Thoraipakkam in Tamil Nadu state, India. Its total length is 68 kilometres (42 mi).
