= Kaluveli =

Kaluveli Tank
- Location within Tamil Nadu
- Location: Tindivanam taluk, Villupuram District, Tamil Nadu, India
- Coordinates: 12°10′N 79°55′E
- Lake type: Wetland
- Catchment area: 47.22 km^{2} (18.23 sq mi)
- Basin countries: India

Kaluveli, also spelled Kazhuveli, is the second largest brackish water lake in South India located in Tindivanam taluk of Villupuram district of the state of Tamil Nadu. It is about 18 km north of Pondicherry. The tank lies adjacent to the Bay of Bengal along the East Coast Road and encompasses about 15 villages with a catchment area of 4,722 ha. Kaluveli is an old mangrove forest, which has been degraded over period of time. The entire ecosystem of this wetland is completely destroyed and denuded due to human inference, chiefly, the establishment of salt pans and overfishing. It is one of the prioritized wetlands of Tamil Nadu. It is also one of the 94 identified wetlands under National Wetland Conservation and Management Programme (NWCMP) operationalised by the Government of India in 1985-86 along with Point Calimere and Pallikaranai Marsh in the state of Tamil Nadu. A total of 196 minor irrigation tanks and ponds drains into the Kaluveli wetlands. Out of the total area of 740 km^{2}, 47.22 km^{2} has been declared as protected area under Section 26 of Tamil Nadu Forest Act. In the northern parts where brackish water could be found, attempts are made to dig up channels in fish-bone design and mangroves species such as rhizhophora and avicennia have been planted in extents varying from 50 to 100 ha annually. In the southernmost portions where seasonal water flow is available, plantations have been raised in total barren areas with appropriate species through schemes such as Tamil Nadu Afforestation Project and the National Afforestation Project. Various conservations tasks such as bio-upgradation, eco-development, community development works, protection, monitoring and evaluation are being implemented and seminars and workshops are being conducted since 2007 under the NWCMP.
