= Velachery Lake =

Lake in Velachery, Chennai, India

Velachery Aeri
- வேளச்சேரி ஏரி (Tamil)
- Location within Chennai
- Location: Velachery, Chennai, Tamil Nadu
- Coordinates: 12.988°N 80.213°E
- Basin countries: India
- Settlements: Chennai

Velachery Aeri (Tamil: வேளச்சேரி ஏரி), or Velachery Lake, is one of the lakes inside Chennai, in the Indian state of Tamil Nadu. As Velachery is a low-lying area, the monsoon rain water from the neighbouring areas drain into the lake.

The ambitious programme of the corporation was conceived three years ago. The local body had even engaged a consultant, shortlisted by experts from Anna University, Public Works Department and the agriculture department. The consultant gave a detailed plan in October last on how to beautify the lake. This included removal of encroachments in Gandhi Nagar and Ambedkar Nagar, fencing of the entire waterbody, provision of three decks for walking, viewing and fishing and a boating jetty. The consultant also suggested plantation of African grass, reed and bamboo along the middle deck and flowering plants and trees like bottlebrush, bougainvillea, royal palms and areca nut betel palms along the upper deck.

The rapid pace of real estate development in the last two decades resulted in the shrinking of the waterbody from 265 acres to 55 acres. The government allocated 53 acres to the Tamil Nadu Housing Board and 34 acres to the Tamil Nadu Slum Clearance Board for housing development.

Local residents have expressed concerns around the pollution of the lake. This is due to sewage flowing into the water, something that has caused the local mosquito populations to grow.

== See also ==
- Water management in Chennai
