= Kaluveli Bird Sanctuary =

Wildlife Sanctuary in Tamil Nadu, India

- Location within Tamil Nadu Location within India
- Interactive map of Kaluveli Bird Sanctuary
- Coordinates: 12°07′20″N 79°52′30″E
- Area: 51.56 km^{2} (19.91 sq mi)
- Established: 2021
- Governing body: Tamil Nadu Forest Department

Kaluveli Bird Sanctuary, sometimes spelled Kazhuveli Bird Sanctuary, is a protected area and bird sanctuary located in Marakkanam of Villupuram district of the Indian state of Tamil Nadu.

== Location ==
The sanctuary covers an area of 51.56 km^{2} (19.91 sq mi) and was notified in 2021. It was designated as a Ramsar site of international importance in 2024.

The sanctuary has the brackish shallow Kaluveli lake, which is connected to the Bay of Bengal by the brackish Uppukalli creek and the Edayanthittu Estuary.

== Fauna ==
It lies in the Central Asian Flyway and hence is an important stopover site for migratory bird species.
