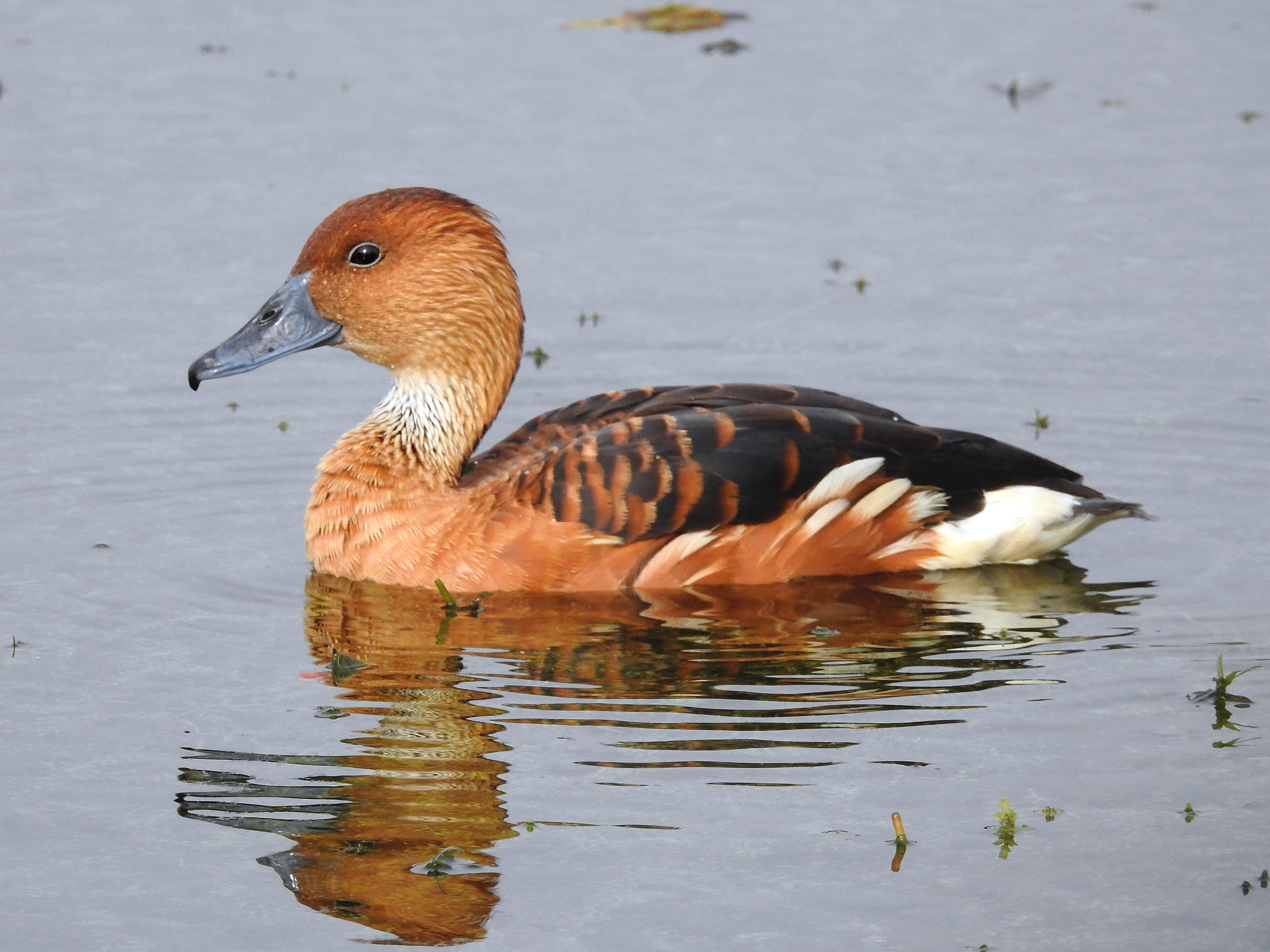
- Adult at the Lake Apopka, Florida

Conservation status
- Least Concern (IUCN 3.1)

Scientific classification
- Kingdom: Animalia
- Phylum: Chordata
- Class: Aves
- Order: Anseriformes
- Family: Anatidae
- Genus: Dendrocygna
- Species: D. bicolor

Binomial name
- Dendrocygna bicolor (Vieillot, 1816)
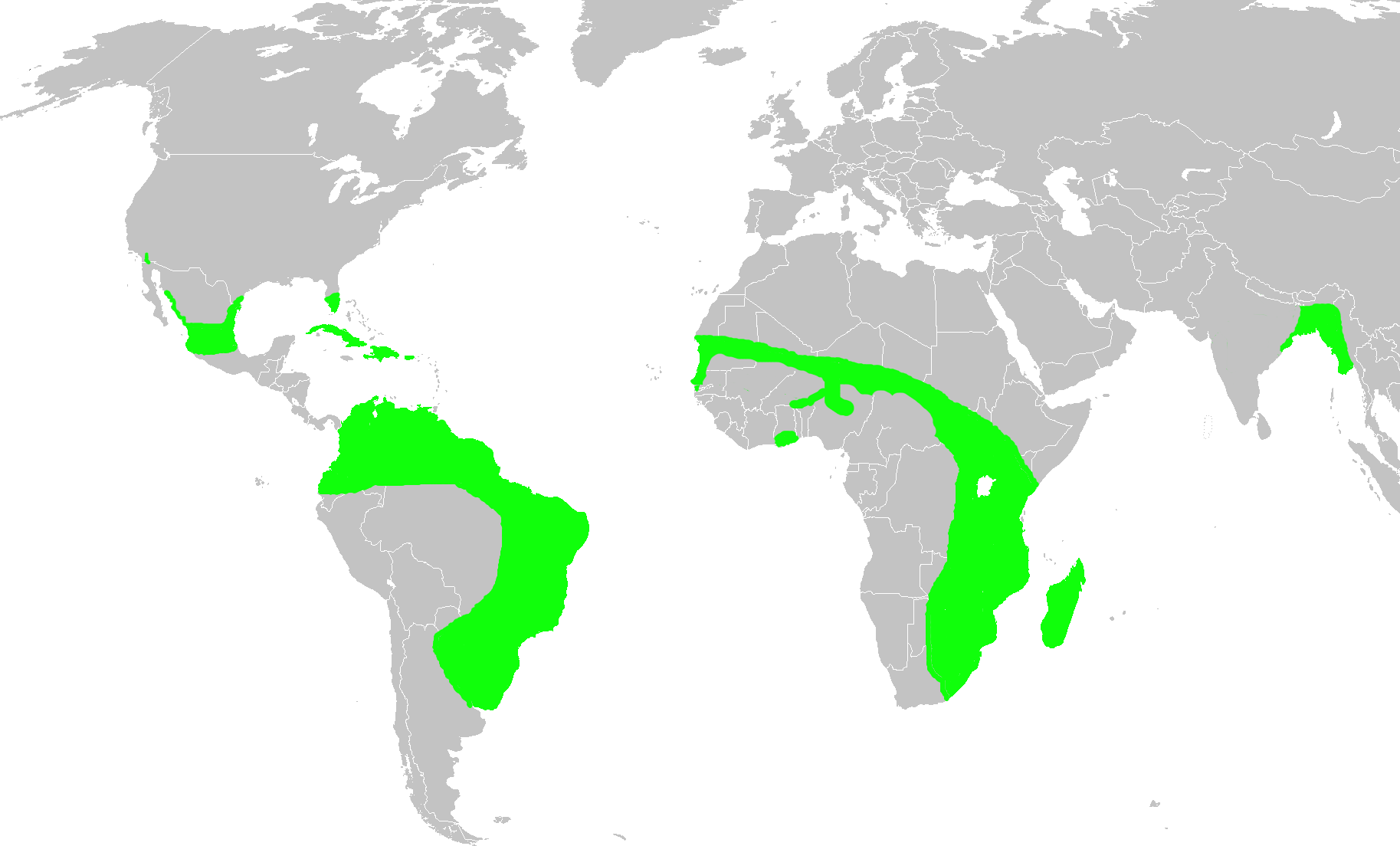
- Approximate breeding range

= Fulvous whistling duck =

Species of bird native to tropical wetlands

The fulvous whistling duck or fulvous tree duck (Dendrocygna bicolor) is a species of whistling duck that breeds across the world's tropical regions in much of Mexico and South America, the West Indies, the southern United States, sub-Saharan Africa and the Indian subcontinent. It has plumage that is mainly reddish brown, long legs and a long grey bill, and shows a distinctive white band across its black tail in flight. Like other members of its ancient lineage, it has a whistling call which is given in flight or on the ground. Its preferred habitat consists of wetlands with plentiful vegetation, including shallow lakes and paddy fields. The nest, built from plant material and unlined, is placed among dense vegetation or in a tree hole. The typical clutch is around ten whitish eggs. The breeding adults, which pair for life, take turns to incubate, and the eggs hatch in 24–29 days. The downy grey ducklings leave the nest within a day or so of hatching, but the parents continue to protect them until they fledge around nine weeks later.

The fulvous whistling duck feeds in wetlands by day or night on seeds and other parts of plants. It is sometimes regarded as a pest of rice cultivation, and is also shot for food in parts of its range. Despite hunting, poisoning by pesticides and natural predation by mammals, birds, and reptiles, the large numbers and huge range of this duck mean that it is classified as least concern by the International Union for Conservation of Nature.

== Taxonomy ==
The whistling ducks, Dendrocygna, are a distinctive group of eight bird species within the duck, goose and swan family, Anatidae, which are characterised by a hump-backed, long-necked appearance and the whistled flight calls that give them their English name. They were an early split from the main duck lineage, and were predominant in the Late Miocene before the subsequent extensive radiation of more modern forms in the Pliocene and later. The fulvous whistling duck forms a superspecies with the wandering whistling duck. It has no recognised subspecies, although the birds in northern Mexico and the southern US have in the past been assigned to D. b. helva, described as having paler and brighter underparts and a lighter crown than D. b. bicolor.

The duck was first described by Johann Friedrich Gmelin in 1789 and given the name Anas fulva but the name was "preoccupied", or already used, by Friedrich Christian Meuschen in 1787 for another species. (Note: Scientific names are given in accordance with strict chronological priority, so Gmelin's name could not be used since it had previously allocated to another species. The identity of the duck designated as Anas fulva by Meuschen is not known.) This led to the next available name proposed by French ornithologist Louis Pierre Vieillot in 1816 from a Paraguayan specimen as Anas bicolor. (Note: Le Canard roux et noir) The whistling ducks were moved to their current genus, Dendrocygna, by British ornithologist William Swainson in recognition of their differences from other ducks. The genus name is derived from the Ancient Greek dendron, "tree", and Latin cygnus, "swan", and bicolor is Latin for "two-coloured". "Fulvous" means reddish-yellow, and is derived from the Latin equivalent fulvus. Old and regional names include large whistling teal, brown tree duck, Mexican duck, pichiguila, squealer and Spanish cavalier.

== Description ==
The fulvous whistling duck is 45–53 cm (18–21 in) long; the male weighs 748–1,050 g (26.4–37.0 oz), and the female averages marginally lighter at 712–1,000 g (25.1–35.3 oz). The wingspan ranges from 85 to 93 cm.

It is a long-legged duck, mainly different shades of brown; head, neck and breast are particularly rich buff (fulvous) with a darker back. The mantle is more darker shade of brown with buff-tipped feathers, the flight feathers and tail are dark brown, and a dark brown to black stripe runs through the center of the crown down the back of the neck to the base of the mantle. It has whitish stripes on its flanks, a long grey bill and grey legs. In flight, the wings are brown above and black below, with no white markings, and a white crescent on the rump contrasts with the black tail. All plumages are fairly similar, but the female is slightly smaller and duller-plumaged than the male. The juvenile has paler underparts, and appears generally duller, especially on the flanks. There is a complete wing moult after breeding, and birds then seek the cover of dense wetland vegetation while they are flightless. Body feathers may be moulted throughout the year; each feather is replaced only once annually.

These are noisy birds with a clear whistling kee-wee-ooo call given on the ground or in flight, frequently heard at night. Quarrelling birds also have a harsh repeated kee. In flight, the beating wings produce a dull sound. The calls of males and females show differences in structure and an acoustic analysis on 59 captive birds demonstrated 100% accuracy in sexing when compared with molecular methods.

Adult birds in Asia can be confused with the similar lesser whistling duck, which is smaller, has a blackish crown and lacks an obvious dark stripe down the back of the neck. Juvenile fulvous whistling ducks are very like young lesser whistling ducks, but the crown colour is still a distinction. Juvenile comb ducks are bulkier than whistling ducks and have a dark cap to the head. In South America and Africa, juvenile white-faced whistling ducks are separable from fulvous by their dark crowns, barred flanks and chestnut breasts.

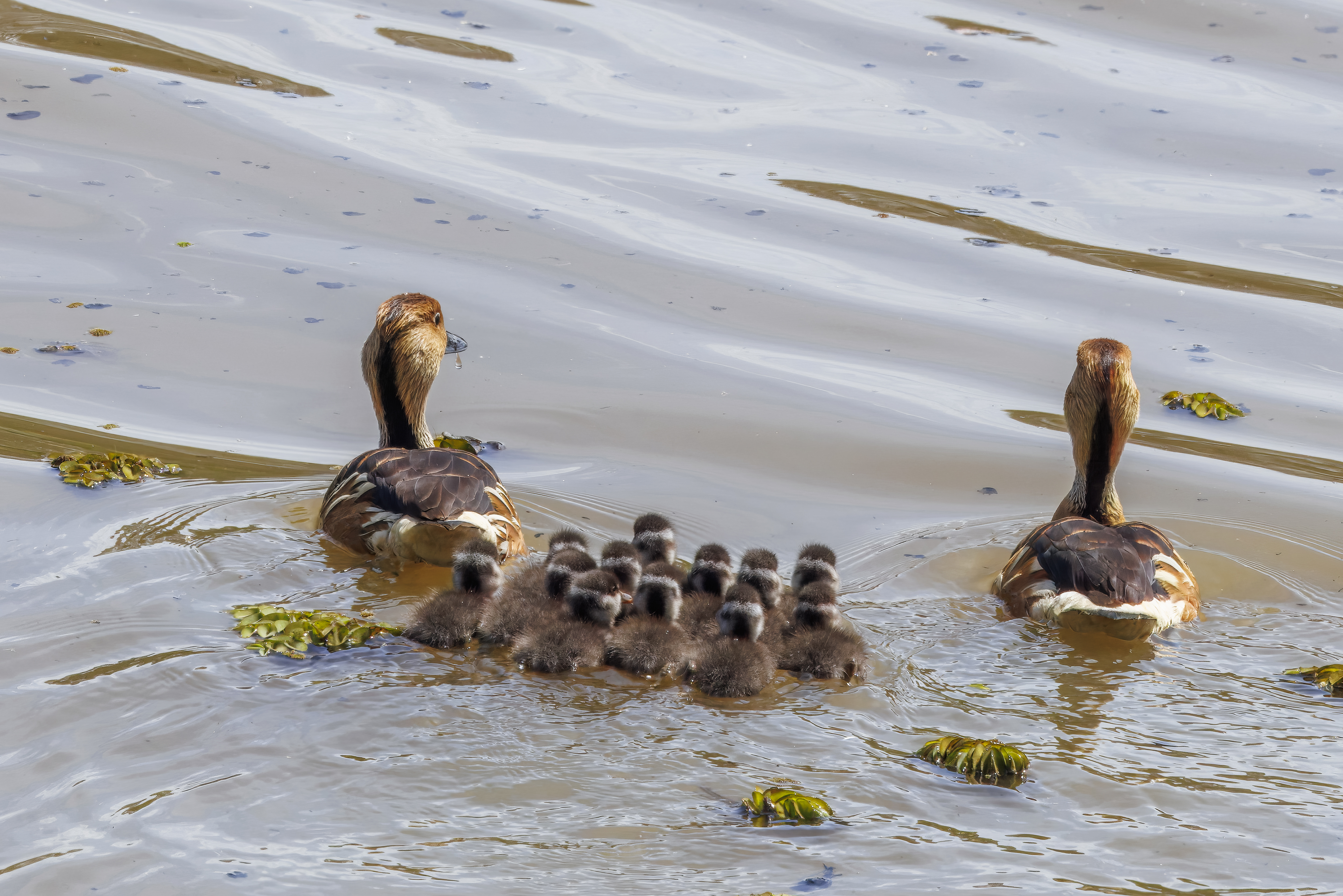
Pair with chicks

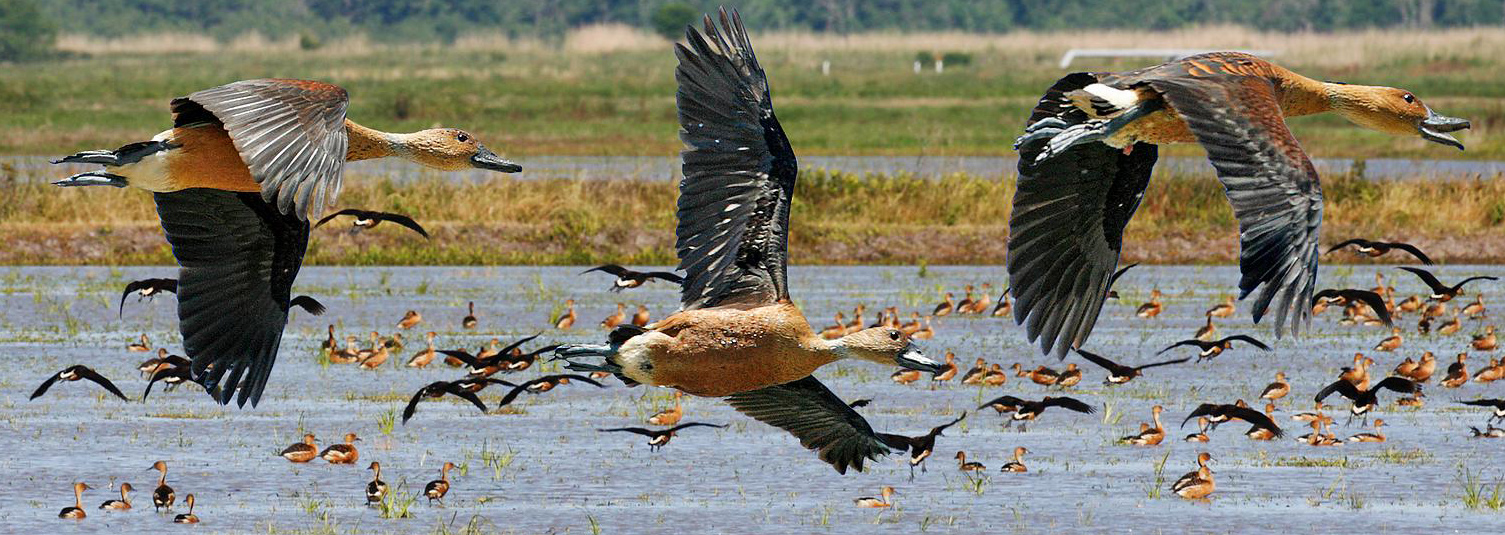
Showing black-and-white tail pattern

== Distribution and habitat ==
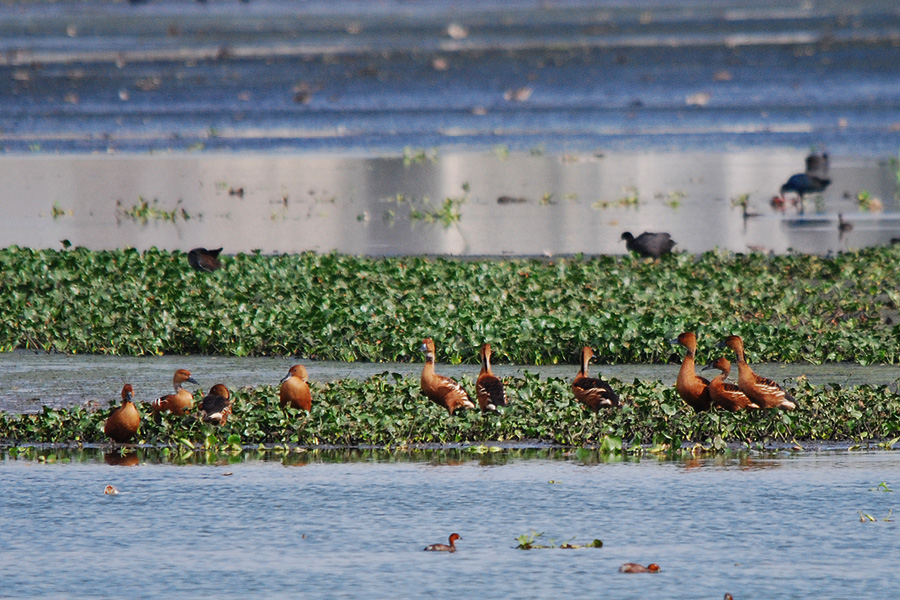
A flock at Pallikaranai wetland, India

The fulvous whistling duck has a very large range extending across four continents. It breeds in lowland South America from northern Argentina to Colombia and then up to the southern US and the West Indies. It is found in a broad belt across sub-Saharan Africa and down the east of the continent to South Africa and Madagascar. The Indian subcontinent is the Asian stronghold. It undertakes seasonal movements in response to the availability of water and food. African birds move southwards in the southern summer to breed and return north in the winter, and Asian populations are highly nomadic due to the variability of rainfall. This species has strong colonising tendencies, having expanded its range in Mexico, the US and the West Indies in recent decades with northerly range expansions into California in late 19th century and rice-growing regions of the U.S. Gulf Coastal Plain in the early to mid-20th century, given its affinity for rice-growing areas. Breeding in the northern American region is restricted to the Gulf Coastal Plain of Texas and Louisiana and localities in southern California and south- and east-central Florida. Observations of the bird outside the nesting season, especially since the 1950s have been recorded in temperate regions as far north as the Mississippi River Basin, eastern Great Lakes region, and along the Pacific and Atlantic Coasts right up to southern Canada. Wandering birds can turn up far beyond the normal range, sometimes staying to nest, as in Morocco, Peru and Hawaii.

The fulvous whistling duck is found in lowland marshes and swamps in open, rice fields, flat country, and it avoids wooded areas. It is not normally a mountain species, breeding in Venezuela, for example, only up 300 m (980 ft), but the single Peruvian breeding record was at 4,080 m (13,390 ft).

== Behaviour ==
This species is usually found in small groups, but substantial flocks can form at favoured sites. It walks well, without waddling, and normally feeds by upending, though it can dive if necessary. It does not often perch in trees, unlike other whistling ducks. It flies at low altitude with slow wingbeats and trailing feet, in loose flocks rather than tight formation. It feeds during the day and at night in fairly large flocks, often with other whistling duck species, but rests or sleeps in smaller groups in the middle of the day. They are noisy and display their aggression towards other individuals by throwing back their heads. Before taking off in alarm, they often shake their head sideways.

Several arthropod parasites have been recorded on this duck, including chewing mites of the families Philopteridae and Menoponidae, feather mites and skin mites. Internal helminth parasites include roundworms, tapeworms and flukes. In a survey in Florida, all 30 ducks tested carried at least two helminth species; none had blood parasites. Only one duck had no mites or lice.

=== Breeding ===
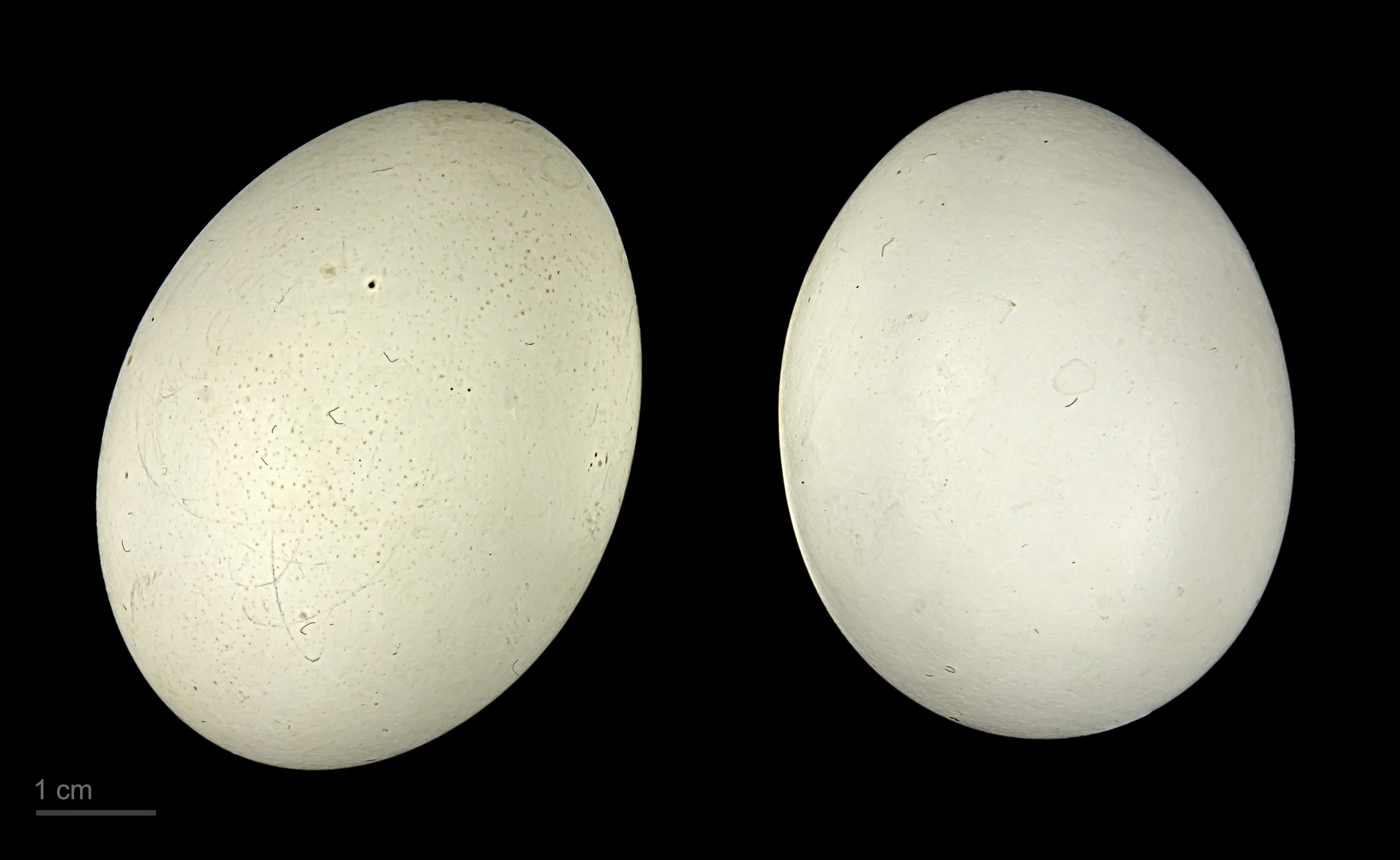
Dendrocygna bicolor - MHNT

Breeding coincides with the availability of water. In South America and South Africa, the main nesting period is December–February, in Nigeria it is July–December, and in North America mid-May–August. In India, the breeding season is from June to October but peaking in July and August. Fulvous whistling ducks show lifelong monogamy; the courtship display is limited to some mutual head-dipping before mating and a short dance after copulation in which the birds raise their bodies side by side while treading water.

Pairs may breed alone or in loose groups. In South Africa, nests may be within 50 m (160 ft) of each other, and breeding densities of up to 13.7 nests per square kilometre (35.5 per square mile) have been found in Louisiana. The nest, 19–26 cm (7.5–10.2 in) across, is made from plant leaves and stems and has little or no soft lining. It is usually built on the ground (unlike the Black-bellied whistling duck), in marsh vegetation, and in artificial habitats such as shallowly-flooded rice fields, in dense vegetation and close to water, but sometimes in tree holes. In India, the use of tree holes, and even the old nests of raptors or crows, is much more common than elsewhere. Eggs are laid at roughly 24- to 36-hour intervals, starting before the nest is complete, resulting in some losses from the clutch. They are whitish and on average measure 53.4 mm × 40.7 mm (2.10 in × 1.60 in) and weigh 50.4 g (1.78 oz). The clutch is usually around ten eggs, but other females sometimes lay into the nest, so 20 or more may be found on occasion. Eggs may also be added to the nests of other species, like ruddy duck.

Both sexes incubate, changing over once a day, with the male often taking the greater share of this duty. The eggs hatch in about 24–29 days, The downy ducklings are grey, with paler upperparts, and a white band on the neck, and weigh 22–38 g (0.78–1.34 oz) within a day of hatching. Like all ducklings, they are precocial and leave the nest after a day or so, but the parents protect them until they fledge around nine weeks later. Eggs and duckling may be preyed on by mammals, birds and reptiles; one parent may try to distract a potential predator with a broken-wing display while the other adult leads the ducklings away. Birds are sexually mature after one year, and the maximum known age is 6.5 years.

In South Africa, a few records of hybridization with the white-faced whistling duck have been noted in the wild; in most parts of southern Africa, the two species breed at different times, bicolor during the dry season (April to September) and viduata during the rains (October to March). Hybridization in captivity is more frequent but limited to other species in the genus Dendrocygna.

== Feeding ==
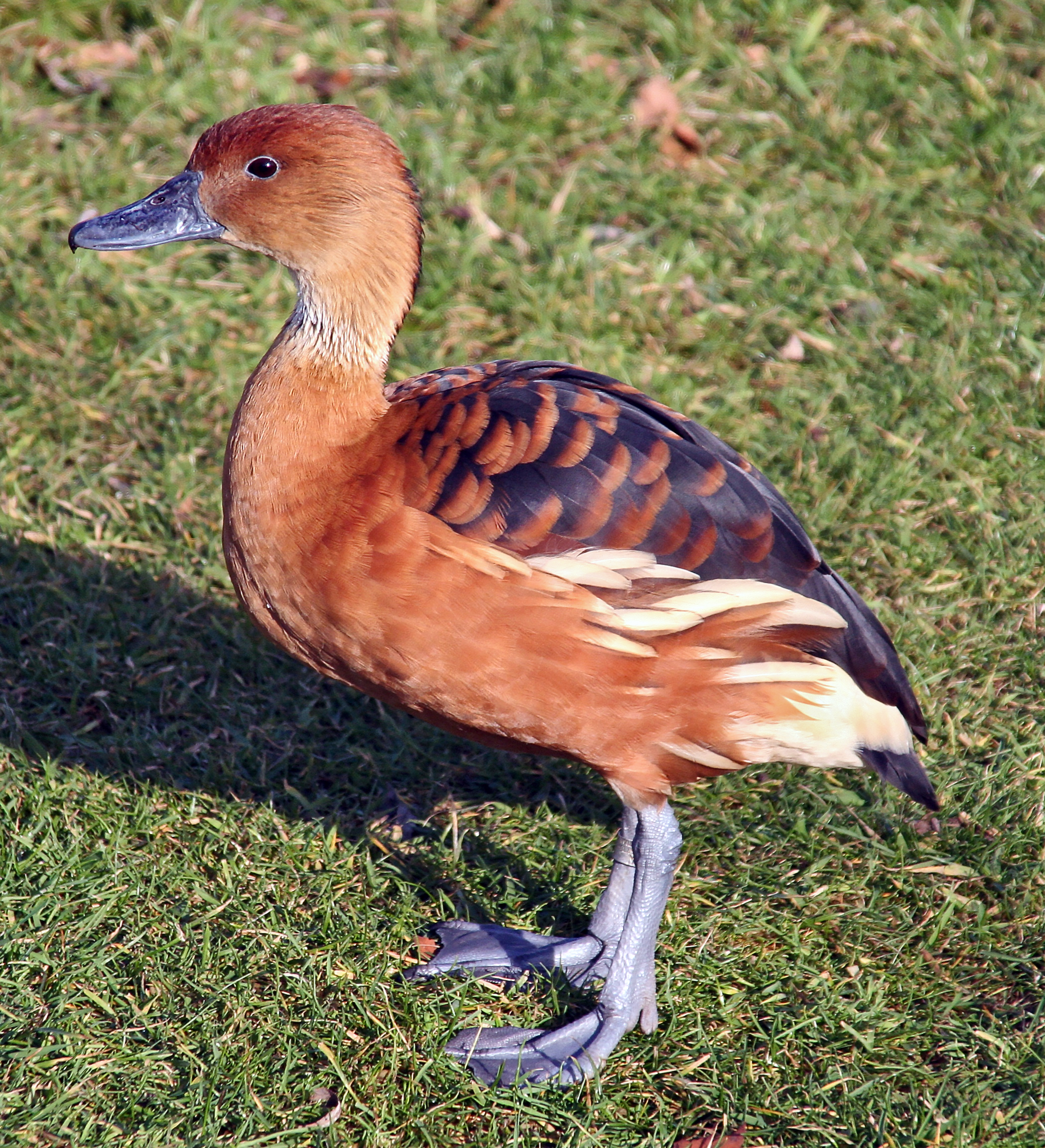
Long legs enable the duck to stand erect and walk without waddling.

The fulvous whistling duck feeds in wetlands by day or night, often in mixed flocks with relatives such as white-faced or black-bellied whistling ducks. Its food is generally plant material, including seeds, bulbs, grasses and stems, but females may include animal items such as aquatic worms, molluscs and insects as they prepare for egg-laying, which may then comprise up to 4% of their diet. Ducklings may also eat a few insects. Foraging is by picking plant items while walking or swimming, by upending, or occasionally by diving to a depth of up to 1 m (3.3 ft). Favoured plants include water snowflake, aquatic ragweeds, bourgou millet, shama grass, Cape blue water lily, waxy-leaf nightshade, beakrush, flatsedge and polygonums. Rice is normally a small part of the diet, and a survey in Cuban rice fields found that the plants taken were mainly weeds growing with the crop. However, in a study in Louisiana, 25% of the diet of incubating females consisted of cereal.

== Status ==
The International Union for Conservation of Nature (IUCN) estimates the population of the fulvous whistling duck to be from 1.3 to 1.5 million individuals around the world. This may be an underestimate since regional assessments suggest 1 million birds in the Americas, 1.1 million in Africa and at least 20,000 in South Asia for a grand total of 2.12 million ducks around the world. The population appears to be declining, but the decrease is not rapid enough to trigger the vulnerability criteria for extinction. The large numbers and huge breeding range mean that this duck is classified by the IUCN as being of Least Concern. It is one of the species to which the Agreement on the Conservation of African-Eurasian Migratory Waterbirds (AEWA) applies.

The fulvous whistling duck has expanded its range in the West Indies, and into the southern US. A series of invasions from South America and reaching the eastern US commenced around 1948, fueled by rice cultivation, and breeding was recorded in Cuba in 1964, and Florida in 1965. Some Florida birds still winter in Cuba. In Africa, it bred on the Cape Peninsula between 1940 and the 1960s. A survey of eighteen species which had colonised the area in recent decades found that most were wetland species that had used irrigated farmland as "stepping stones" across the arid country separating the peninsula from the breeding main range. However, the status of the two whistling duck species featured in the research is dubious since they are popular ornamental species, so their origin is unclear.

Outside North America it is subject to hunting for food or because of its liking for rice, and persecution means that it is now rare in Madagascar. Pesticides used on rice fields may also have an adverse impact, causing liver and breast muscle damage even at sub-lethal levels.

== Cited texts ==
- Ali, Salim; Ripley, Dillon S (1978). Handbook of the birds of India and Pakistan. Volume 1 (2nd ed.). New Delhi: Oxford University Press.
- Barlow, Clive; Wacher, Tim; Disley, Tony (1997). A Field Guide to birds of The Gambia and Senegal. Boroughbridge, Sussex: Pica Press. ISBN 978-1-873403-32-7.
- Feduccia, Alan (1999). The Origin and Evolution of Birds. New Haven, Connecticut: Yale University Press. ISBN 978-0-300-07861-9.
- Hilty, Steven L (2003). Birds of Venezuela. London: Christopher Helm. ISBN 978-0-7136-6418-8.
- Jobling, James A (2010). The Helm Dictionary of Scientific Bird Names. London: Christopher Helm. ISBN 978-1-4081-2501-4.
- Johnsgard, Paul (1965). Handbook of Waterfowl Behavior. Ithaca, New York: Comstock Publishing Associates.
- Kear, Janet (2005). Ducks, Geese and Swans. Vol. 1. Oxford: Oxford University Press. ISBN 978-0-19-854645-0.
- Madge, Steve; Burn, Hilary (1988). Wildfowl: An Identification Guide to the Ducks, Geese and Swans of the World (Helm Identification Guides). London: Christopher Helm. ISBN 978-0-7470-2201-5.
- Phillips, John Charles (1922). A Natural History of the Ducks. Vol. 1. Cambridge: Houghton Mifflin.
- Swainson, William (1837). On the Natural History and Classification of Birds. Vol. 2. London: Longman, Rees, Orme, Brown, Green & Longman.
- Vieillot, Louis Pierre (1816). Nouveau Dictionnaire d'Histoire Naturelle (in French). Vol. 5. Paris: Deterville.
