= Jalladiampet =

Jaladianpet
- city
- Location in Tamil Nadu, India
- Coordinates: 12°55′13″N 80°12′29″E
- Country: India
- State: Tamil Nadu
- District: Chennai district
- Taluka: Sholinganallur

Population (2011)
  - Total: 18,547

Languages
  - Official: Tamil
- Time zone: UTC+5:30 (IST)

Jaladianpet is a census town in Chennai district in the Indian state of Tamil Nadu.

== Demographics ==
In the 2001 India census, Jalladiampet had a population of 7,576. Males constituted 51% of the population and females 49%. Jalladiampet had an average literacy rate of 70%, higher than the national average of 59.5%: male literacy was 77%, and female literacy was 62%. In 2001 in Jalladiampet, 12% of the population was under 6 years of age.

In the 2011 census, Jalladiampet had a population of 18,547.

Jalladiampet comes under the Chennai corporation Jalladianpet got jeyachandiran textile near puliyamaram bus stop

Pillaiyar kovil streets, veerathamman kovil street, rice mill road & nesavalar nagar are the olden streets. jalladianpet got main entrance entering in area 1.from oil mill bus stop,2. near pulliyamaram bus stop,3.near vidhya school,4. near perumbakkam junction,

Jalladiampet has large number of Water bodies / Lakes.
