= Perungudi =

- Neighbourhood
- Perungudi, Chennai, Tamil Nadu
- Coordinates: 12.9654°N 80.2461°E
- Country: India
- State: Tamil Nadu
- District: Chennai
- Metro: Chennai

Government
  - Body: Greater Chennai Corporation
- Elevation: 47 m (154 ft)

Population (2011)
  - Total: 43,111

Languages
  - Official: Tamil
- Time zone: UTC+5:30 (IST)
- PIN: 600096
- Vehicle registration: TN-07

Perungudi is a neighbourhood of Chennai in the state of Tamil Nadu, India. It is situated about 10 kilometres (6.2 mi) south of Adyar. It is bordered on two sides by the Old Mahabalipuram Road and the Perungudi lake. It is situated on the Old Mahabalipuram IT Expressway right in middle of an Information Technology (IT) Estate. It is between Taramani and Thoraipakkam and parallel to Kottivakkam and Palavakkam in the East Coast Road (ECR Highway).

The suburb is inhabited by an equal mix of new migrants and descendants of some early clans who migrated to the area approximately 300 years ago. Perungudi is seeing heightened activities in recent years due to its strategic location. The population of Perungudi was approximately 8,000 in 2000 but has grown significantly in the years since then. Being in the IT Corridor of Chennai, Perungudi is increasingly being preferred as a residential locality by software engineers. Despite this significant growth, Perungudi lacks basic civic amenities such as underground storm and waste drainage system, piped potable water and good roads. This region has gained more importance owing to its location on the IT highway and proximity to city neighbourhoods like Palavakkam, Thiruvanmiyur, Adyar and Velachery.

== Geography ==
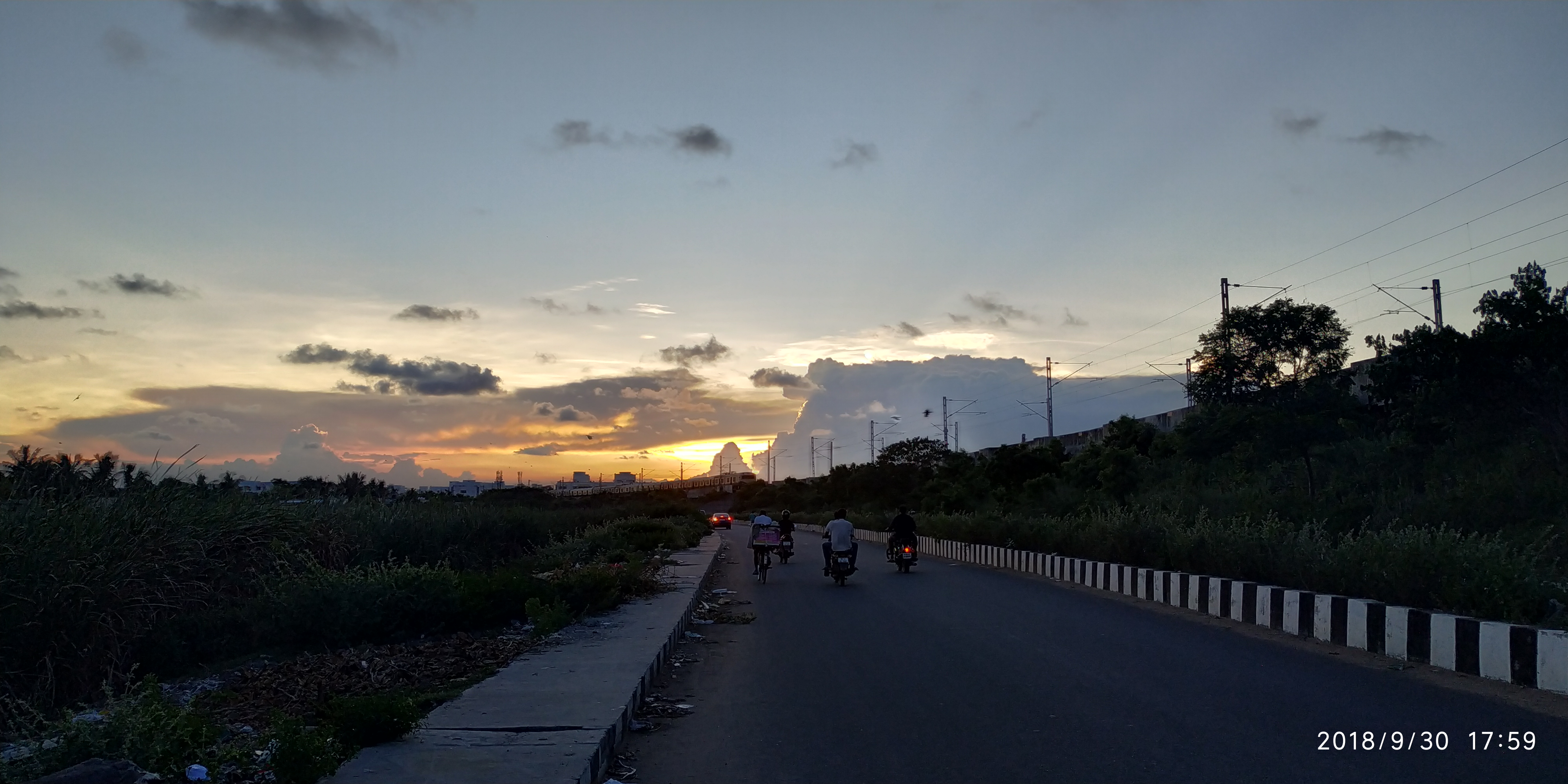
Road to Perungudi Railway station

Perungudi is located at 12.97°N 80.25°E. It has an average elevation of 9 metres (29 feet).

As of 2018, the Perungudi zone had the lowest green cover estimate at 5.31 percent, as against the city's 14.9 percent average.

== Demographics ==
As of 2001 India census, Perungudi had a population of 23,481. Males constitute 53% of the population and females 47%. Perungudi has an average literacy rate of 72%, higher than the national average of 59.5%: male literacy is 77%, and female literacy is 65%. In Perungudi, 12% of the population is under 6 years of age.

== Economy ==
Perungudi has developed from a small village to a vibrant and thriving commercial/residential hub after the boom in the Indian IT industry. The World Trade Center Chennai is located here. IT companies like Amazon company, news channel Thanthi TV & many more IT companies are present here. Perungudi had developed an industrial estate in the 90's. It is still struggling with poor infrastructure for decades despite boasting offices of some the biggest IT companies in India.

== Dump Yard ==
Perungudi houses one of the two major landfills in Chennai. The dump yard is constantly in the news for the burning of garbage despite it being banned. The dump yard also spills into the pallikarnai marshland which is home to a lot of local and migratory birds. The plans to close the dumpyard by the corporation have not yet been implemented.

== Administrative ==
=== Panchayat ===
In 2011 Perungudi Town Panchayat was merged with Chennai Corporation.

=== Elections ===
Although the Panchayat presidential elections are nominally held once every five years, no elections were held for a period of 15 years between 1979 and 1994. Later in 1996 election was conducted. In the 2010s, Perungudi Panchayat came under Chennai Corporation ward 186 (out of 200).

=== Metropolitan Transport Corporation ===
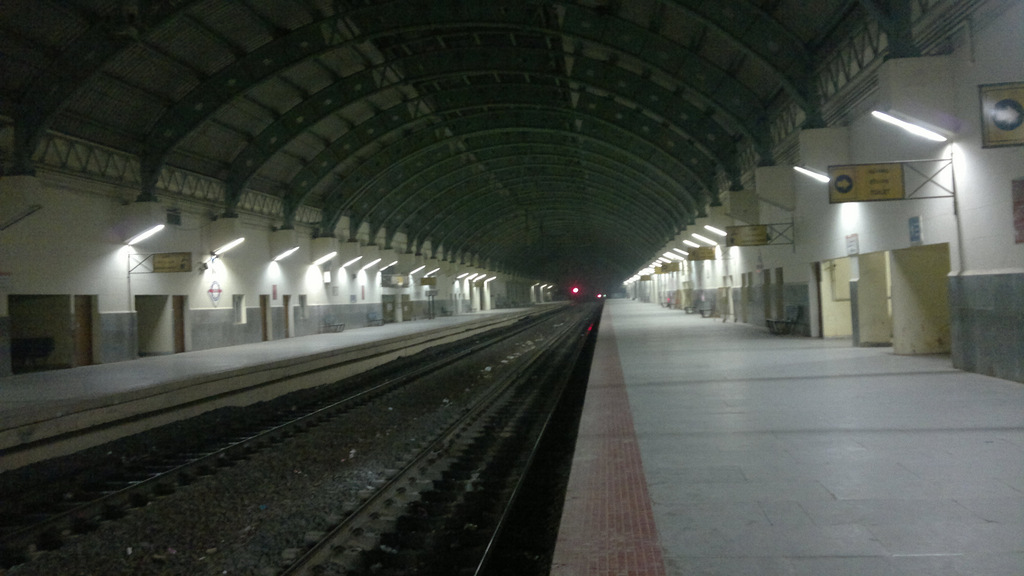
Perungudi railway station

The "Metropolitan Transport Corporation" ("MTC" from P(pallavan)TC) connects Perungudi to transit points like Saidapet, Adayar, and Tiruvanmiyur. The bus numbers include 19B, 102 and 19A. New Bus services (routes 95, 91, 102K, 221, M119, 519, 570, S95) to Tambaram, Kannagi Nagar, Kelambakkam, Royapettah, Marina, Koyambedu, Velachery have been added. There are plans to start new bus routes to the interior areas of Perungudi; Kamaraj Nagar, Rajiv Nagar, Telephone Nagar, Elim Nagar etc.
