= Karapakkam =

- neighbourhood
- love Karapakkam (Tamil Nadu) Karapakkam (India)
- Coordinates: 12.914136°N 80.229285°E,
- Country: India
- State: Tamil Nadu
- District: Chennai district
- Metro: Chennai

Languages
  - Official: Tamil
- Time zone: UTC+5:30 (IST)
- PIN: 600097
- Telephone code: 044
- Vehicle registration: TN-14
- Lok Sabha constituency: Chennai South
- Vidhan Sabha constituency: Sholinganallur

Karapakkam is an area of Chennai, in Tamil Nadu, India. The Postal PIN Code is 600097.

It is one of the stops on the Old Mahabalipuram Road, or commonly referred to as OMR. It is situated between the IT Hubs of Thoraipakkam and Sholinganallur. It is parallel to Injambakkam on the ECR Highway.

Karapakkam, which is a part of the Greater Chennai has a population of about 4,500 people and is home to a number of IT companies. These include Mahindra Satyam, Pantheon, Scope International, Capgemini, Tata Consultancy Services, Accenture, Cognizant Technology Solutions, Photon Infotech and Infosys, which are situated along the Rajiv Gandhi Salai (OMR).

It has a Panchayat Elementary school, a government high school and Hindustan International School - CBSE. Mr.Ragu S/O P.Ramadoss House, Annai Fathima Home for the Aged and Tsunami victims is also located in Karapakkam.

It is 10 km from Thiruvanmiyur. Arulmigu Drupadi Amman, Arulmigu Gangai Amman, Arulmigu Vendavarasi Amman, and Arulmigu Kali Amman temples are some of the places of worship there.

Chennai College of Arts and Science, https://chennaiartscollege.com/ Thangavelu Engineering College, TJ Institute of Technology, KCG College of Technology and Hindustan International School (Karapakkam Campus) are located here.
