= Velachery =

Neighbourhood of Chennai, India

- Neighbourhood
- Location within Chennai
- Coordinates: 12.9758°N 80.2205°E
- Country: India
- State: Tamil Nadu
- District: Chennai
- Metro: Chennai
- Zone: Adyar
- Ward: 175-182

Government
  - Type: City Municipal Corporation
  - Body: Chennai Corporation

Population (2020)
  - Total: 143,991
  - Density: 21,114/km^{2} (54,690/sq mi)
- Demonym: Indian

Languages
  - Official: Tamil
- Time zone: UTC+5:30 (IST)
- Postal code: 600042
- Vehicle registration: TN-22, TN-07
- Parliamentary constituency: South Chennai
- MP: Thamizhachi Thangapandian, DMK
- MLA: R. Kumar, TVK
- Assembly constituency: Velachery
- Planning agency: CMDA
- Website: www.chennaicorporation.gov.in (Governmental)

Velachery is a neighbourhood of Chennai. It is located in the southern part of the Chennai city sharing borders with Guindy in the north, Taramani in the east, Perungudi in the south-east, Pallikaranai in the south, Madipakkam in south-west, Adambakkam in the west and north-west. It is the headquarters of Velachery taluk and straddles the boundary between Chennai and Kancheepuram districts.

== Etymology ==
Velachery has its origin from the Tamil words வேளர் (Velar) meaning farmers or வேளிர் (Velir) from the name of older Tamilakam tribe and the word சேரி (Cheri) meaning community. The name Veli Cheri is found in an inscription at Selliamman temple dating to the period of Cholas.

புலியூர் கோட்டம் வெளிச்சேரியில் உள்ள ஊர் சபையோர் காளாபடாரி கோயிலுக்கு ஒரு நந்தா விளக்கெரிக்கவும் இரண்டு திருவமிர்துக்கும் சேர்த்து நிலம் தானமாக அளித்துள்ளனர்

Another theory states that the name might have its origin from Sanskrit Vedasreni, translated as 'refuge of the Vedas'.

== History ==
The history of Velachery dates back to ninth century CE when it was a small village. Epigraphs indicate that the area was contemporary to other historical townships in the Tondaimandalam region of Tamilakam. The oldest kalvettus in Velachery are in the ancient Selliamman temple from the reigns of Parakesarivarman/Parantaka Chola (9th century) and Parthivendravarman. The Dhandeeswaram temple contains many epigraphs from the times of Gandaraditya Chola (10th century) and emperors Raja Raja Chola I and Rajendra Chola I (11th century).

During the 12th century, Velachery, along with the rest of Tondaimandalam, was thought to have briefly come under the rule of the Kadavas (or Kadavarayas) who were feudatory powers under the Cholas and subsequent Pandya emperors. An epigraph from king Kopperunjingan I of Sendamangalam of South Arcot region is found in Velachery.

As in other contemporary Madras regions, the Velachery epigraphs attest to the remarkable system of local administration systems under Pallavas and Cholas of Tamilakam. There was harmonious functioning of the institutions of central government along a vast network of village 'sabaikal'/'sabhas' or assemblies which enjoyed considerable local autonomy and which were the real guardians of villages. The functioning of the sabaikal in places like Velachery, Kunrattur, Thirumazhisai, Poonamalle and Padi are well attested, with their composition of village elders and learned members of the community, and maintaining law and order, levying taxes and ensuring the functioning of the economy. However, under the subsequent Vijayanagara empire and their feudatories, the power of the local assemblies seems to have progressively declined in favour of more centralized rule.

The Velachery kalvettus mention instances of an Alanganattar family's (thought to be the title of the village elders) donation to the Dhandeeswaram temple, and of two people buying land from the sabai and donating them to the temple. Contemporary accounts from Kavanur near Tiruvottiyur describe how the village assemblies received money from individuals and agreed to pay interest on it. It is clear that the village assemblies possessed the right of buying and disposing of land or other categories of properties owned jointly by the villagers for them and on their behalf.

A Chola record from Velachery mentions a Council of Justice, called Dharmasana, presided by the King and assisted by learned Brahmins, called Dharmasanabhattars. Lesser cases were decided by local courts named as Nyayattar.

In the epigraphs, some parts of the Velachery village were known as Dinachintamani Chaturvedimangalam in honour of land grants given to Brahmins for teaching the four Vedas. (In current times, the Mettu Theru areas of Dhandeeswaram are thought to correspond to the references). In such Brahmadeya villages or Agarams, the lands were held by the village in common on a tenure system known as Ganabhogam, cultivated under joint ownership by the community and the profits shared in proportion to the share held on the land. Another kalvettu mentions a sale of land by non-Brahmins with the permission of king Rajendra Chola I, indicating that even non-Brahmins held land in the Brahmadeya villages.

=== 20th century and later ===
Velachery is a prominent residential neighbourhood in Chennai, which gained importance as the city expanded in the late 20th century. The American Advent Mission School has been a key educational institution in the area since the 1950s. The transformation of Velachery occurred with the widening of Bypass Road in 2005, when it was expanded to a six-laned road, leading to ample opportunities for commercial development.

== Location ==
Velachery is surrounded by Guindy in the north, IIT Madras in the northeast, Taramani in the east, Perungudi in the southeast, Pallikaranai Wetland in the south, and also Madiipakkam in the South and southwest, Adambakkam in the west and northwest.

== Geography ==
Velachery consists mostly of areas that have clay and hard rock. The Velachery lake was historically about 910 ha with the ancient Selliamman and Narasimhar temples on its southern corner. South of Velachery, there were thousands of acres of marshland called Kazhuveli made of coarse elephant grass (called Kazhu Pul) and swamps. The area was also called Kazhiveli as it allowed rainwater runoff and catchment. It had six natural spring aquifers that enabled the water table to be recharged. The marshland also was a sanctuary for resident and migratory birds. Beginning in the last decades of 20th century, the marshland all but disappeared due to rapid development and encroachment. The remaining southern portions of the marshland make up the Pallikaranai wetland.

== Transportation ==
The Velachery MRTS Flyover

=== Air ===
The nearest airport to Velachery is the Chennai International Airport near Meenambakkam which is at a distance of ~8–10.5 km (5.0–6.5 mi). The shortest route to the airport is via the Inner Ring Road (IRR) which is less traffic prone. The other way is to go via Guindy using the GST-Anna Salai(Mount Road) route which is more traffic prone and it is the longest route. There are direct Volvo buses between the airport and Velachery operated by MTC. Auto rickshaws (Indian Taxi) and taxicabs between the airport and Velachery are available at a nominal cost of ₹ 200-250 (US$4–5). MTC buses also take this route but one has to break the journey and change buses.

=== Road ===
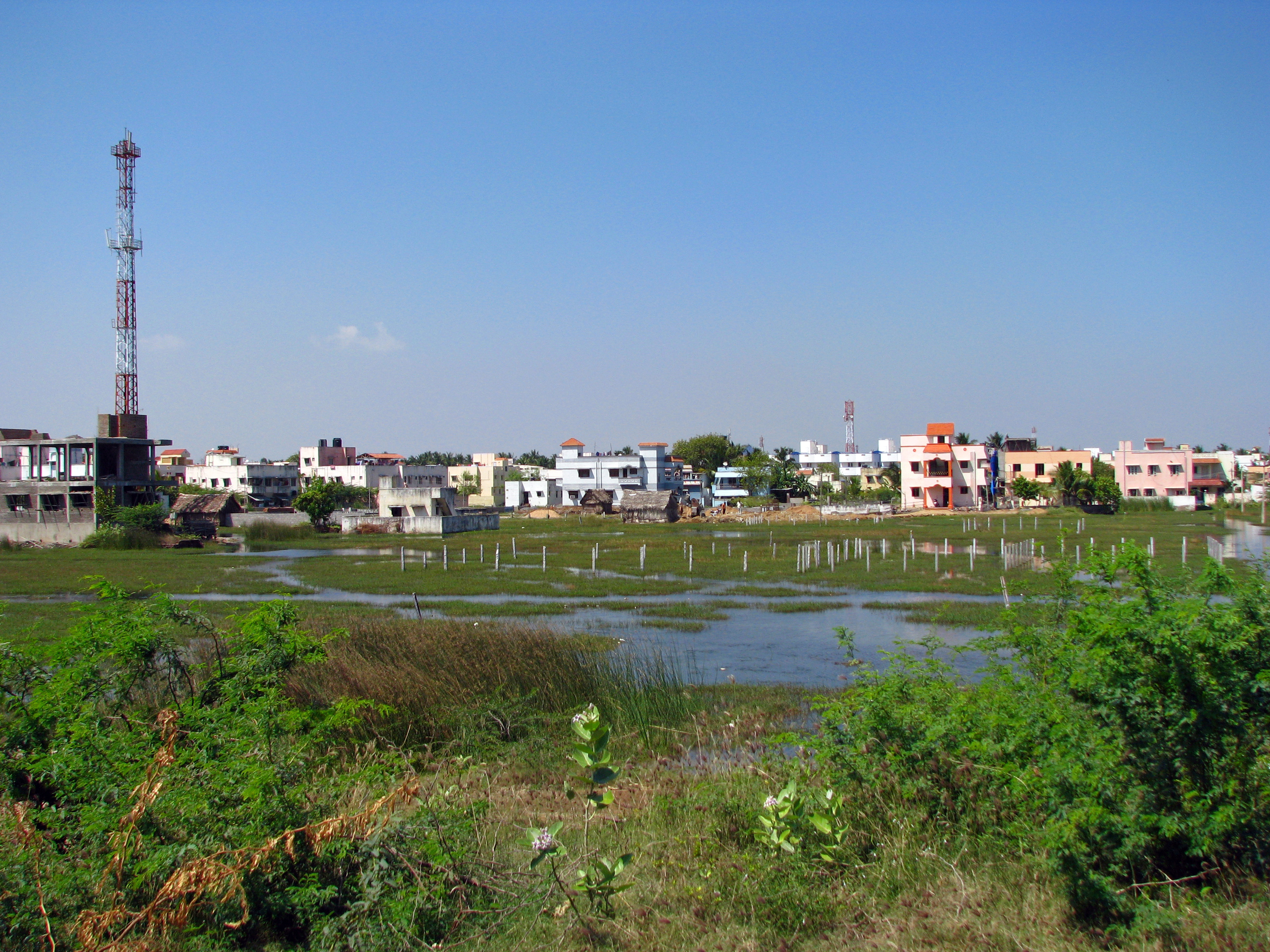
View of Velichery

Velachery is well connected to rest of the city by bus services operated by MTC. Vijayanagar Bus Terminus is the major and biggest bus stand in the Velachery locality from where buses fly to various parts of the city. There are three arterial roads: Velachery Main Road, Taramani Link Road, and Velachery Bypass Road. The Vijayanagar junction is one of the most important junctions in the city.

=== Rail ===
Station Code: VLCY-- Velachery is well connected by 5 ft 6 in (1,676 mm) broad gauge rail to the rest of the city through the Velachery MRTS Railway Station. The daily EMU services are operated by the Indian Railways. The second part of the Mass Rapid Transit System (MRTS) between Tirumailai and Velachery was formally inaugurated by M. Karunanidhi (former CM of Tamil Nadu) in the presence of R.Velu (former Union Minister of State for Railways) and this became operational on 15 November 2007.

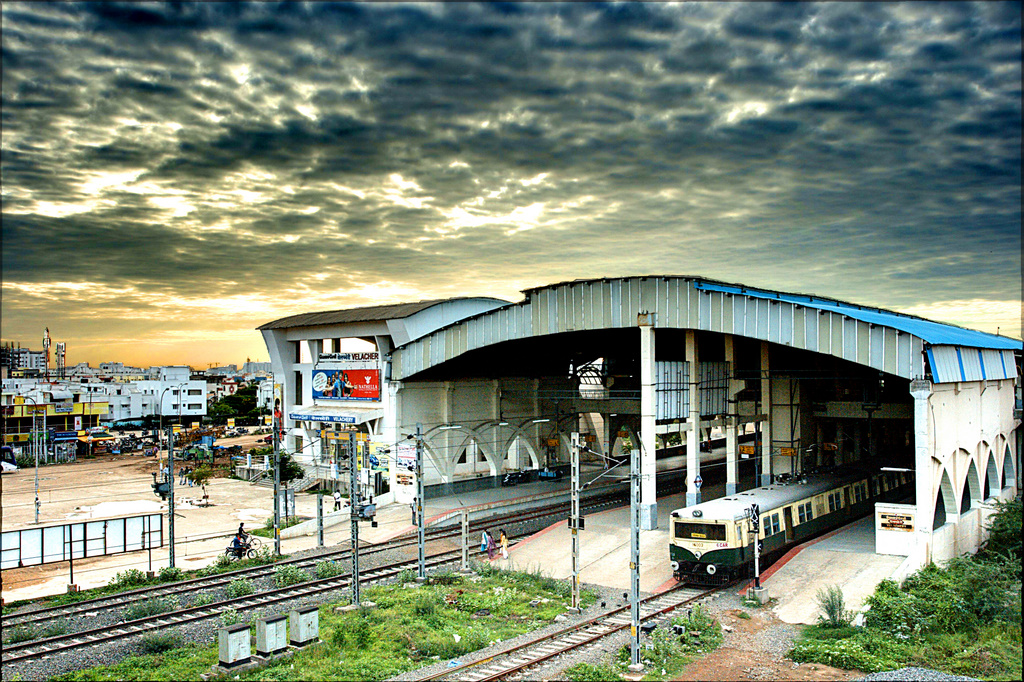
A railway station on the MRTS line

There are EMU services from Chennai Beach to Velachery at a minimum interval of 10 minutes and a maximum of 40 minutes. The first service starts at 0500 hrs and the last service is at 2300 hrs during week-days

== Infrastructure ==
One of the major reasons for Velachery to become a residential attraction is the infrastructure. Even though most of the regions in Velachery are flood prone, major investments have gone in to improve the storm water drain network in the locality. The corporation has also invested in rail and road connectivity to Velachery from the central business districts of Chennai. Some major infrastructure projects which are being executed by the Chennai Corporation in Velachery are,

- MRTS extension connecting Velachery with St. Thomas Mount.

The extension of the MRTS from Velachery to St. Thomas Mount is a long pending project which faced severe hardships since the last 0.5 km (0.31 mi) stretch of land is to be acquired from densely populated residential localities of St. Thomas Mount. This project is likely to be completed soon, as the link is crucial to realize the maximum usage of the MRTS.

- Construction of storm water drain connecting Velachery with South Buckingham canal.

The storm water drain network is being constructed underneath the 6 lane road connecting Velachery with Taramani. This project is funded by the world bank.

- Construction of twin flyovers at the busy Vijayanagar junction in Velachery

The busy Vijayanagar junction in Velachery is to dot with twin multilevel flyovers that connects three arterial roads namely Velachery-Tambaram main road, 100 feet bypass road and Taramani link road. These flyovers would bring much relief to the traffic-choked Vijayanagar junction.

- Beautification of Velachery lake.

A detailed project report was prepared to make Velachery lake fit for boating and to make it a tourist attraction. The corporation has initiated a major development plan for Velachery lake since it is one of the very few surviving water bodies in the city. The lake also serves as a major groundwater recharge for the adjoining localities.

== Infrastructure and environmental concerns ==
A major concern is that the recent rapid developments has also resulted in a few drawbacks, such as water scarcity, congestion of roads and the damage to the marshland. It is feared that in a few years unless something substantial is done, the marshlands would all be converted into residential and commercial properties.

Every November, Velachery is flooded by cyclonic rains. The major areas that are usually flooded are the low-lying areas around the Velachery Lake. A floodwater drainage canal was constructed along the Velachery 100-feet (30 m) road. Due to encroachments, some part of the canal in the Velachery-Tambaram high road is not constructed completely. Generally, it is felt that after the canal was built; to a major extent, the flooding problem in many areas along the 100-foot road had decreased substantially. All the residential colonies that are lying south of Taramani link road were flooded during the floods of 2008, which were of moderate intensity. A major storm water drain project running all through the Taramani Link road from Vijayanagar bus stand in Velachery connecting South Buckingham canal is in progress. This project which is funded by the World Bank, is expected to bring much relief to the residents of flood-prone Velachery.

The residential area of Velachery in Chennai serves as an example of flooding because of the neglect of its wetlands. The area was severely affected by flooding in 2015 and continues to experience flooding every November due to the encroachment of the neighbouring Pallikaranai marshland. Over time, the marshland has been encroached upon and has lost 1850 hectares (nearly 75.5% of the total wetland) between 1991–2015 to projects like the Mass Rapid Railway line, the IT corridor, and other infrastructural projects. Due to this, the wetland could no longer hold the capacity to absorb a large amount of flood water.

There are also two big open to air dumping grounds. These spoil the underground water and are breeding grounds for mosquitoes and other flies and the frequent burning of the waste also creates a lot of pollution problems to the people especially those traveling past it. It is a favorite shooting location among filmmakers and has been filmed in as far as 3 movies.

Now that Velachery has become a separate assembly constituency the woes of its residents are expected to be mitigated at a faster pace.

== Economy ==
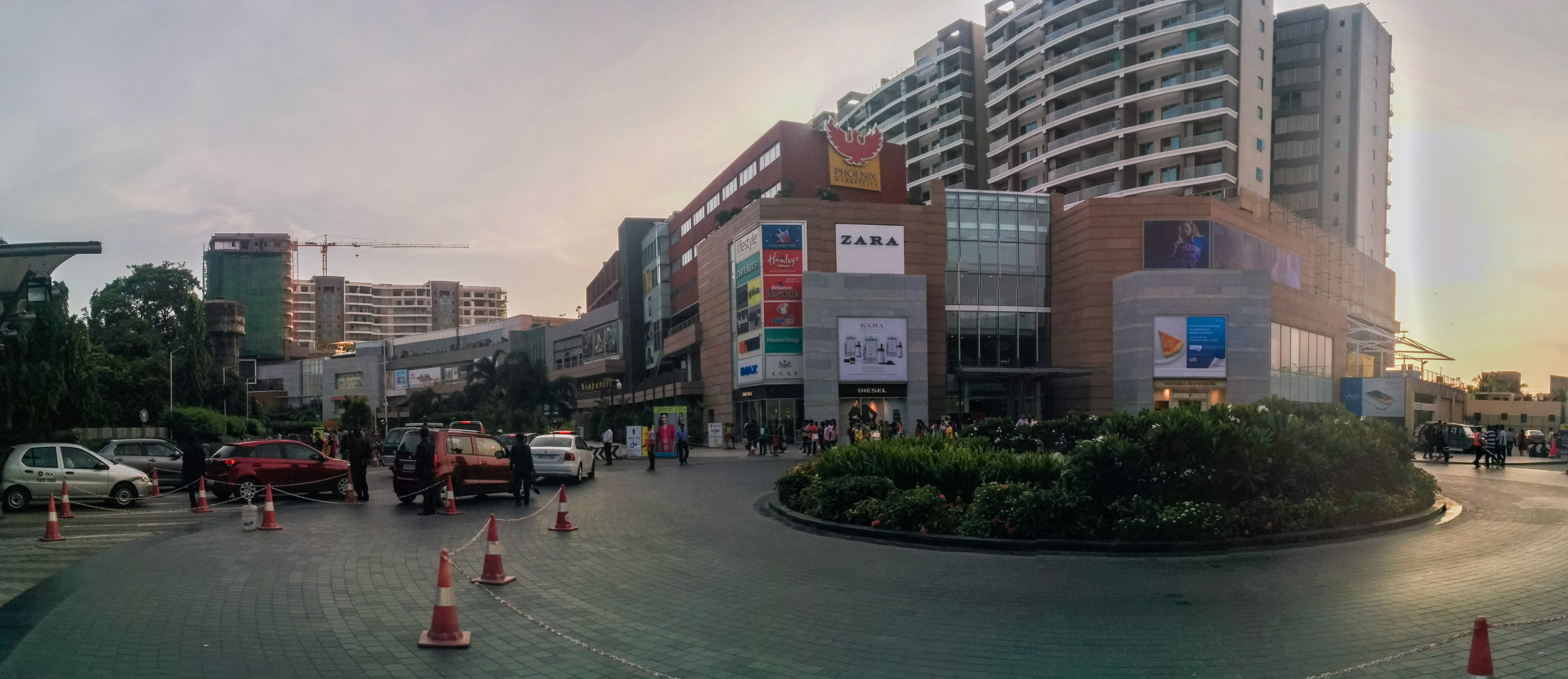
Phoenix Market City, Velachery, Chennai

Several IT/ITES companies have set up their offices in Velachery. Some major ones include Tata Consultancy Services (TCS), ZOHO Corp, AllSec Technologies. Laptopstore, Fyndus, TeleData and Sutherland Global Services. IT and working-class people prefer to settle in Velachery as more IT parks emerge on the Old Mahabalipuram road and its proximity to the Central Business Districts of Chennai. This part of Chennai was considered to be socio-economically backwards a decade ago, but the area has changed rapidly after a string of key residential projects. The standard of living in and around Velachery has increased considerably.

Phoenix Market City was opened in January 2013 at Velachery is one of India's Biggest shopping Malls Further, The Grand Mall was also opened in 2013 near the Velachery railway station.

== See also ==
- Chennai
- Chennai Mass Rapid Transit System
- Pallikaranai wetland
