= Thuraipakkam =

Neighborhood of Chennai, India

Okkiyam Thuraipakkam Oggiyandorai துரைப்பாக்கம்
- neighbourhood
- Location within Chennai Location within Tamil Nadu Location within India
- Coordinates: 12.949045°N 80.240546°E
- Country: India
- State: Tamil Nadu
- District: Chennai
- Metro: Chennai

Languages
  - Official: Tamil
- Time zone: UTC+5:30 (IST)
- PIN: 600097
- Telephone code: +91 44 2496/ 2458
- Vehicle registration: TN-14

Okkiyam Thuraipakkam (Tamil: ஒக்கியம் துரைப்பாக்கம்) also known as Torapakam or Oggiyandorai, is an area of Chennai, India. It is one of the stops on what is called as the IT expressway, on Old Mahabalipuram Road, now known as Rajiv Gandhi Salai, the first six lane road in Chennai. Okkiyam Thoraipakkam is on the eastern banks of the Pallikaranai marsh which has been designated as a reserve forest area and is one of the few remaining significant natural ecosystems within Chennai . Thoraipakkam is 3 km in length, starting from Perungudi to its north. It is located exactly in the middle of the OMR Road (Like Sholinganallur or Navalur).

The Thoraipakkam Pallavaram Radial road running east to west connects the IT corridor and the GST Road (Grand Southern Trunk Road) making Thoraipakkam well connected to the airport especially after the opening of the flyover (ROB) at the western end of the radial road in October 2010. This road plays a significant role, enabling quicker and easier movement of traffic between the major arterial roads to the south of Chennai including GST Road, Tambaram-Velachery main road and Old Mahabalipuram Road.

Okkiyam Thoraipakkam has experienced substantial growth over the past decade, and it serves as a residential and commercial hub for neighbourhood in the south of Chennai. A number of information technology companies are based in Thoraipakkam. It has many IT Buildings and has many plants in the middle of the road. Palm Trees are known to grow in here.

Okkiyam Thoraipakkam has pollution-related problems because a portion of the Pallikaranai marsh has been converted into a dump yard and garbage including medical waste, plastics, tires, are burnt. However, since beginning of 2009, burning has been officially banned and this has led to considerable improvement in the air quality and reduced the levels of pollution in the area. After the tsunami of 2004, affected fishermen were relocated to Kannagi Nagar which is a part of Thoraipakkam.

The adjacent places to Thoraipakkam are

- Perungudi
- Neelankarai
- Palavakkam
- Karapakkam
- Pallikaranai
- Injambakkam
- Okkiyam Thoraipakkam

Chennai city corporation boundaries were expanded in the latter half of 2011. Subsequently, Thoraipakkam has ceased to be a village panchayat and has become fully integrated within Greater Chennai corporation.

== Transport ==
There are three major bus routes for the OMR road. One is from Madhya Kailash {Guindy, Tambaram, Broadway, Central and also MRTS}, second from Adyar {Adyar, High Court, T.Nagar, Saidapet, Mylapore, Thrivanmiyur, Santhome, Foreshore Estate, Parrys, Mahabalipuram, Thiruporur, Kalpakkam, Tambaram} and lastly from Velachery {Taramani, Guindy, Vadapalani, Guduvancherry, Pallavaram, Chrompet, Vandalur, Koyambedu Thoraipakkam Pallavaram Link Road}. Thoraipakkam is well connected to the city by the Chennai metropolitan transport corporation. Bus Route No's. [95, 19B, 19C, M5, 21H, H21, T21, 519, 5G, M5G, M70, M19P, M5S, A21,91, 570, 568C 521, M19D, M119, 119A, 568, 5Gct, M119ct, 91, 91V] All buses heading towards the city from Sholinganallur and Kelambakkam run through Thoraipakkam. Auto rickshaws also serve the area. Moreover, Share-Auto-s are also available which are comparatively cheaper than the former.

== Economy ==
Few Industrial and IT/ITES companies have set up their offices in Thoraipakkam. Some major ones include [cognizant, Tata Consultancy Services, Ramco R&D center, Grundfos Pumps, Vestas Wind Technology, Infoview Technologies, Bahwan CyberTek, etc.]. Thoraipakkam also houses few IT parks [Chennai One IT SEZ, ASV Suntech Park, ASV Chandilya Towers, AKDR tower, Purva primus, etc.]

== Malls and Hotels ==
BSR Mall was opened in 2019 at Thoraipakkam, it is a small mall with departmental stores like Cromā, Westside and the first Starbucks on OMR.

Thoraipakkam has quite a few hotels Park Plaza Chennai OMR, Holiday Inn Express.

== Schools ==
List of schools in this area : Sishya OMR, APL Global School, Little Angles, Buds n Blossoms, S.T George, Akshara School, RMT International, Podar Kids (play school) and Government High school. Government run High school oldest and serves lower & lower-middle-class family children. It has very huge land allocated near main road, for play ground and future infrastructures.

Other popular schools near Thoraipakkam: BVM Global@ Seevaram, Sishya, Sankara Matriculation school near Cognizant Technology Solutions, and Jeppiar Matriculation school serves by sending a separate bus for this area kids pickup & drop. Since transportation & crossing of OMR is extremely difficult nowadays, all schools are providing Pickup & Drop facilities by School Van & Bus. Private Van operation also on high demand.

== Colleges ==
Arts and Science college - Dhanraj Baid Jain college (DB Jain college) and MNM Engineering College, CL Metha Pharmacy college is located in this area, near Thoraipakkam Police station. It is one of the oldest landmarks in this area, even now important landmark.

== Music Education ==
Artium Academy (artiumacademy.com), Academy of Indian Music and Arts, Triplet Music Academy are some of the famous music education providers available in Thoraipakkam.

== Residential projects ==
1. Akshaya Tango 2. BBCL Ashraya 3. TVH Park Villa 4. Casa Grande has three projects in the area - Aldea (luxury apartments), Pallagio (villas) & Lanterns Court (premium apartments) 5. Jains Pebble Brook Phase 1 & 2 6. Nu-Tech Kamalalaya 7.Arihant Escapade
