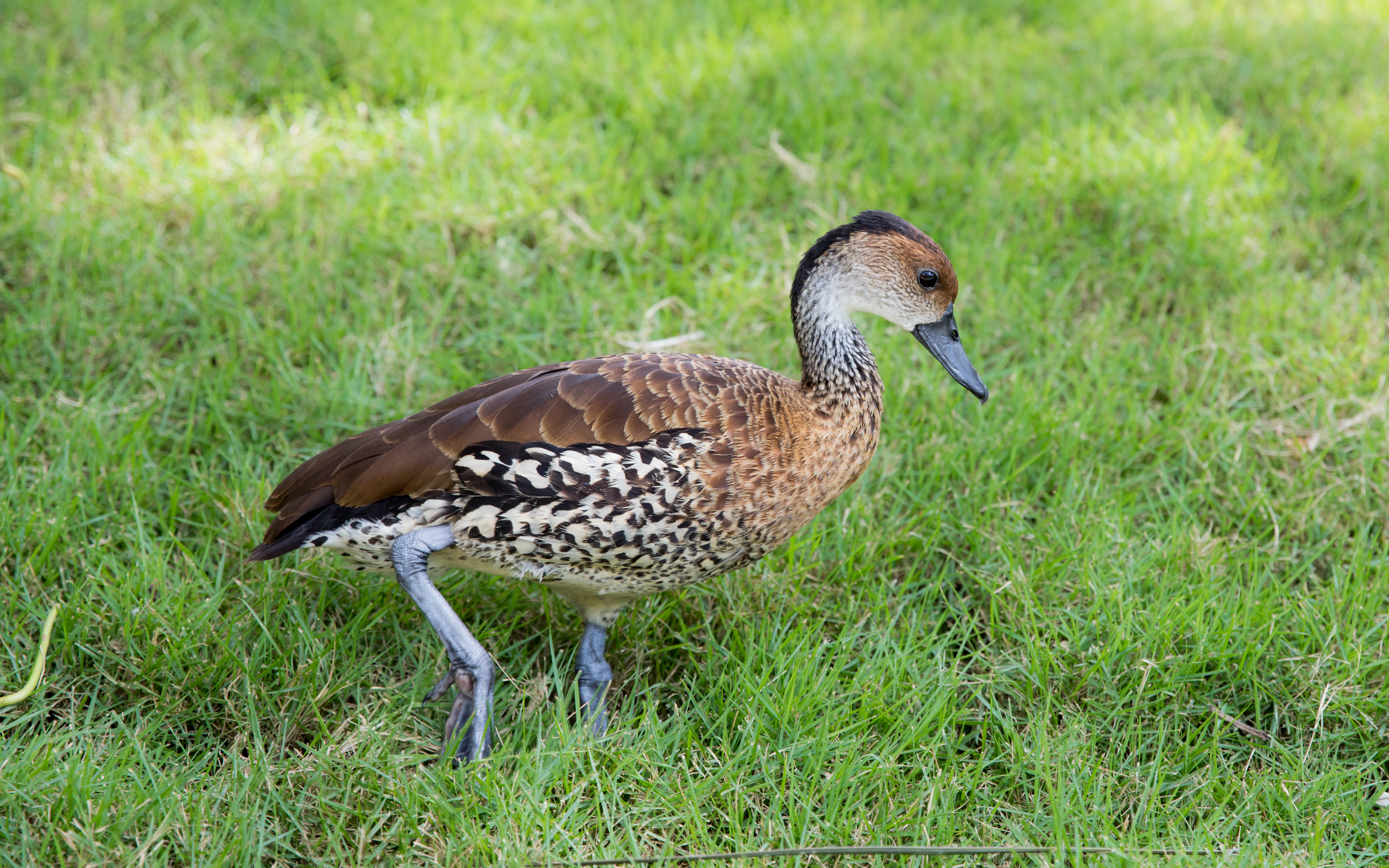

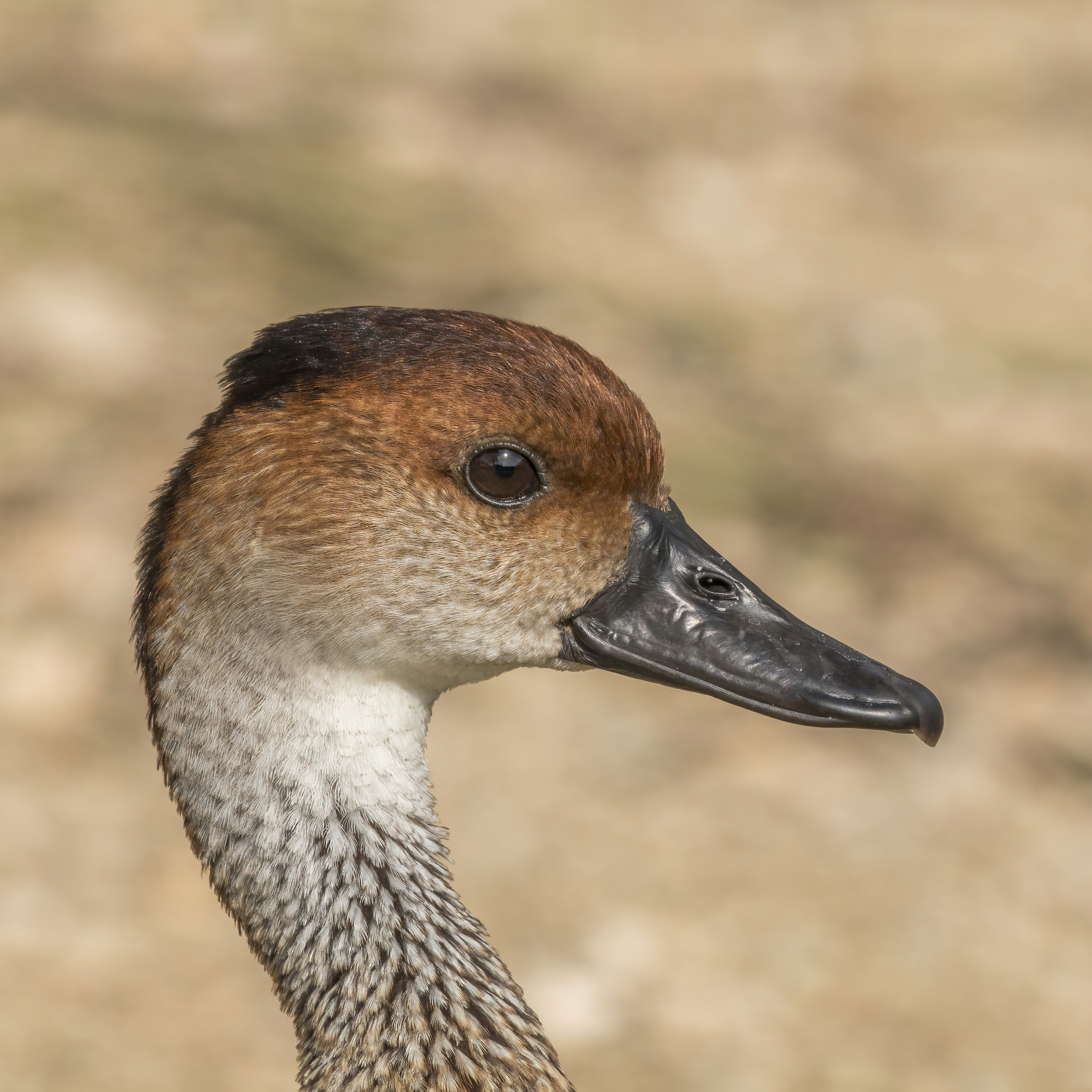

Conservation status
- Near Threatened (IUCN 3.1)
- CITES Appendix II

Scientific classification
- Kingdom: Animalia
- Phylum: Chordata
- Class: Aves
- Order: Anseriformes
- Family: Anatidae
- Genus: Dendrocygna
- Species: D. arborea

Binomial name
- Dendrocygna arborea (Linnaeus, 1758)

Synonyms
- Anas arborea Linnaeus, 1758

= West Indian whistling duck =

Species of bird

The West Indian whistling duck (Dendrocygna arborea) is a whistling duck that breeds in the Caribbean. Alternative names are black-billed whistling duck and Cuban whistling duck.

== Taxonomy ==
The West Indian whistling duck was formally described in 1758 by the Swedish naturalist Carl Linnaeus in the tenth edition of his Systema Naturae under the binomial name Anas arborea. Linnaeus based his account on the descriptions by earlier authors. In 1725 the Irish physician, naturalist and collector Hans Sloane had described and illustrated the "Whistling-Duck" in the second volume of his A Voyage to the Islands Madera, Barbados, Nieves, S. Christophers and Jamaica. Sloane noted that it was common on the island of Jamaica. The English naturalist George Edwards had included a description and a hand-coloured illustration of the "Black-bill'd whistling Duck" in the fourth volume of his A Natural History of Uncommon Birds that was published in 1751. Edwards had been able to examine a specimen at the home of Admiral Sir Charles Wager at Stanley House in Chelsea, west London.

The West Indian whistling duck is now one of eight species placed in the genus Dendrocygna that was introduced in 1837 by the English naturalist William Swainson. The species is treated as monotypic, with no subspecies being recognised. The genus name combines the Ancient Greek dendron meaning "tree" with the genus Cygnus. The specific epithet arborea is from Latin arboreus meaning "tree".

== Description ==
The West Indian whistling duck is the largest and darkest of the whistling ducks with a length of 48 to 58 cm (19 to 23 in). The female weighs from 800 to 1,320 g (1.76 to 2.91 lb) and the male weighs from 760 to 1,240 g (1.68 to 2.73 lb); this species is about the size of a mallard. It has a long black bill, long head and longish legs. It has a pale foreneck and light brown face. The crown, back, breast and wings are dark brown to black, and the rest of the underparts are white with heavy black markings.

All plumages are similar, except that juveniles are duller and have a less contrasting belly pattern.

== Distribution ==
The West Indian whistling duck is widely scattered throughout the West Indies, including a large breeding population in the Bahamas, and smaller numbers in Cuba, the Cayman Islands, Antigua and Barbuda, Jamaica, Hispaniola (both the Dominican Republic and Haiti), and Puerto Rico. It is largely sedentary, apart from local movements, which can be 100 km (62 mi) or more.

== Behaviour ==
=== Breeding ===
Nests have been reported in tree cavities, on branches, in clumps of bromeliads, and on the ground under thatch palms and other dense bushes. The usual clutch size is 10–16 eggs. It habitually perches in trees, which gives rise to its specific name.

=== Food and feeding ===
The birds are mostly nocturnal and secretive, inhabiting wooded swamps and mangroves, where this duck roosts and feeds on plant food including the fruit of the royal palm.

== Threats ==
The West Indian whistling duck has suffered extensive hunting for its eggs and for sport. Wetlands are a very limited habitat in the Caribbean, with continuing conversion for development and agriculture. More than 50% of remaining wetlands are seriously degraded by the cutting of mangroves and swamp-forest, pollution (especially over-use of pesticides) and natural catastrophes such as droughts and hurricanes. Predation by non-native predators is inadequately documented but may be a factor.

== Current conservation measures ==
D. arborea is ranked under CITES Appendix II, as well as CMS Appendix II. It is legally protected throughout much of its range, but law enforcement is inadequate. The West Indian Whistling Duck Working Group initiated a conservation programme in 1997. There are several protected areas in the region but, in general, suitable habitat, especially wetlands, is under-represented. Ducks are predated on Antigua and Barbuda by the small Indian mongooses introduced to control the cane rats which was largely unsuccessful as the rats live in trees.

== Proposed conservation measures ==
Conduct extensive surveys to assess numbers and distribution; assist local authorities in establishing a long-term monitoring programme; conserve key sites; enforce legal protection; initiate public education and awareness programmes.
