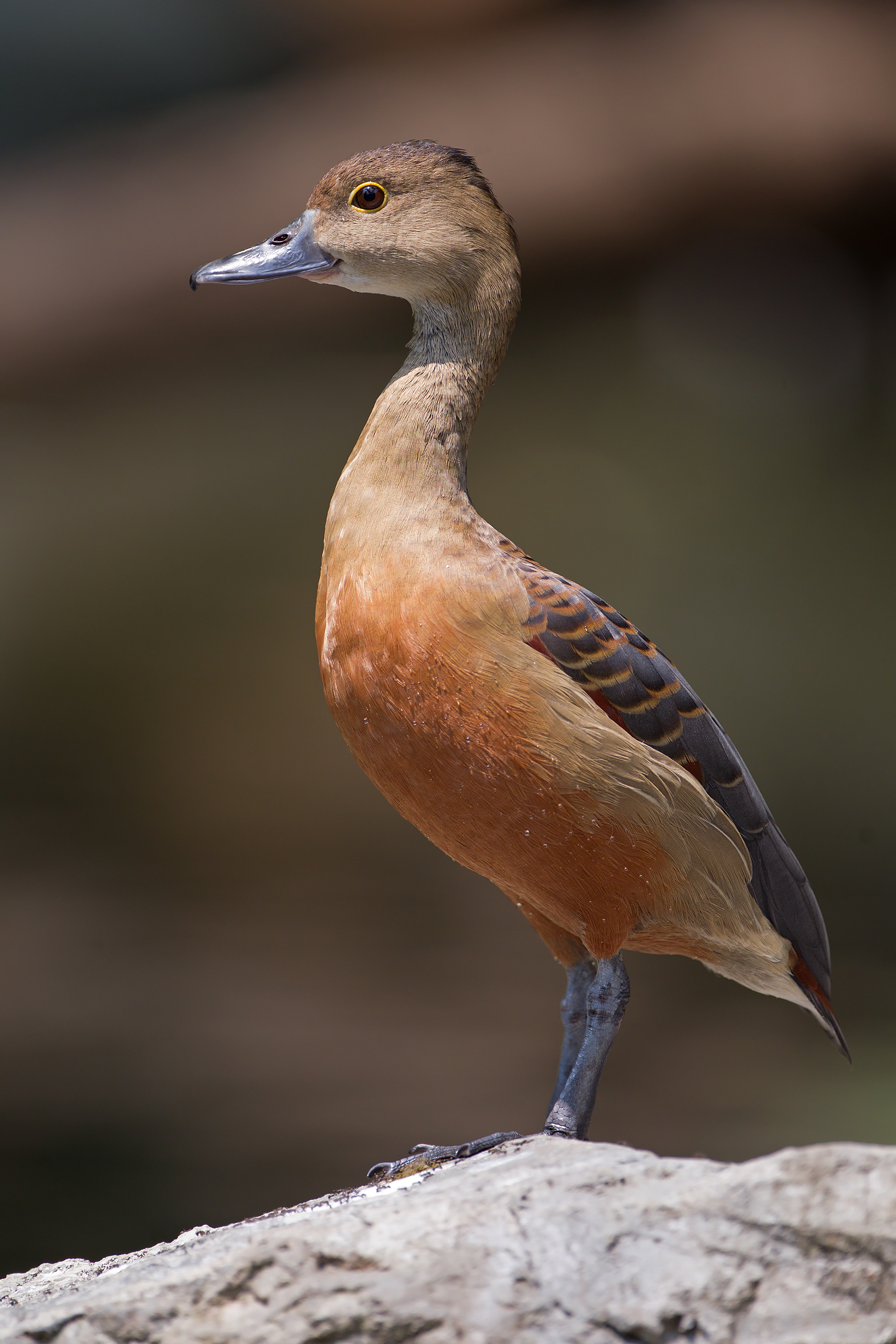
- In Chiang Mai Province, Thailand

Conservation status
- Least Concern (IUCN 3.1)

Scientific classification
- Kingdom: Animalia
- Phylum: Chordata
- Class: Aves
- Order: Anseriformes
- Family: Anatidae
- Genus: Dendrocygna
- Species: D. javanica

Binomial name
- Dendrocygna javanica (Horsfield, 1821)
- Resident range in green and summer range in blue

= Lesser whistling duck =

Species of bird

The lesser whistling duck (Dendrocygna javanica), also known as Indian whistling duck or lesser whistling teal, is a species of whistling duck that breeds in the Indian subcontinent and Southeast Asia. They are nocturnal feeders that during the day may be found in flocks around lakes and wet paddy fields. They can perch on trees and sometimes build their nest in the hollow of a tree. This brown and long-necked duck has broad wings that are visible in flight and produces a loud two-note wheezy call. It has a chestnut rump, differentiating it from its larger relative, the fulvous whistling duck, which has a creamy white rump.

== Description ==
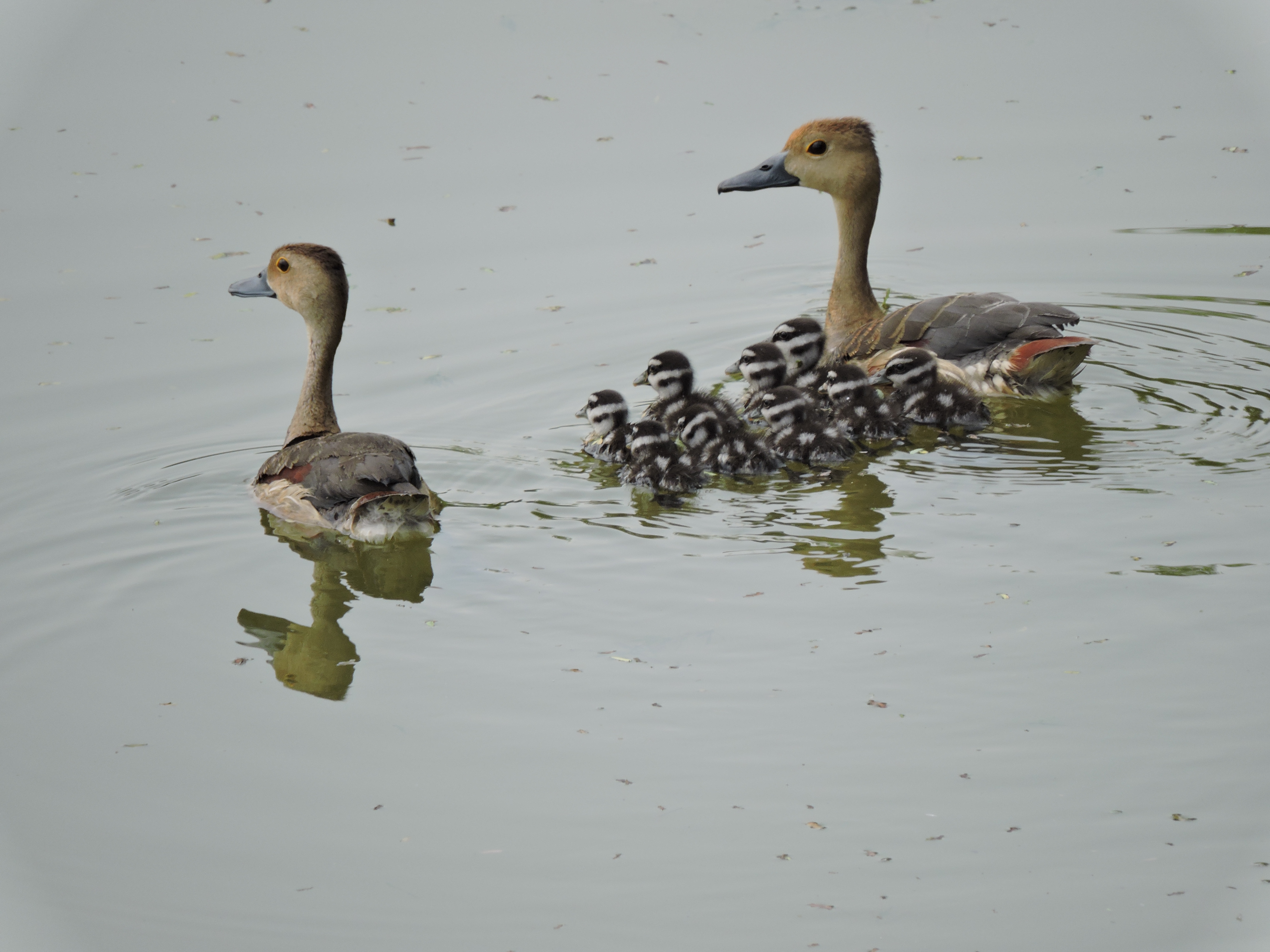
The chicks are patterned in black and white

This chestnut brown duck is confusable only with the fulvous whistling duck (D. bicolor) but has chestnut upper-tail coverts unlike the creamy white in the latter. The ring around the eye is orange to yellow. When flying straight, their head is held below the level of the body as in other Dendrocygna species. The crown appears dark and the sexes are alike in plumage. They fly slowly but with rapid wing-flapping and usually produce a repetitive wheezy seasick call as they circle overhead. They are very nocturnal and often rest during the day. The outermost primary feather has the inner vane modified. They produce very prominent whistling sound while flying.

== Distribution and habitat ==
Shape of the outermost primary, claimed to produce a whistle in flight

This is a largely resident species distributed widely across lowland wetlands of the Indian subcontinent and Southeast Asia. The species also occur on islands in the region including the Andamans, Nicobars and Maldives. They sometimes make local movements in response to weather and changes in water availability and the more northern birds winter further south. They are found in freshwater wetlands with good vegetation cover and often rest during the day on the banks or even on the open sea in coastal areas. Downy chicks are black with a white eyebrow and white patches on the back of the head, the wing, lower back and rump. Albino individuals have been seen in the wild.

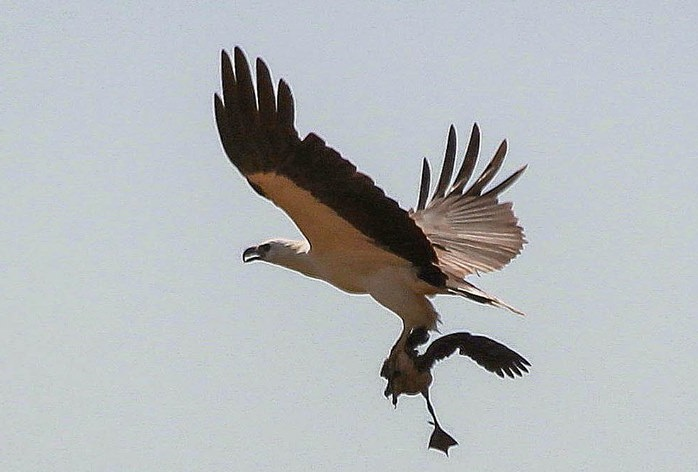
White-bellied sea eagle (Icthyophaga leucogaster) with captured duck

Large numbers are sometimes found in urban wetlands such as in Kolkata and Goa, particularly during winter. In the Alipore Zoological Gardens, captive individuals were introduced in the 1930s and wild birds joined this nucleus subsequently.

With a wide distribution range between 1 and 10 million km², they are considered to have a secure global population of between two and twenty million individuals. They are not threatened by hunting as they are not considered good to eat. Hunters in Assam however have been known to raise the ducklings to serve as live decoy.

== Behaviour and ecology ==
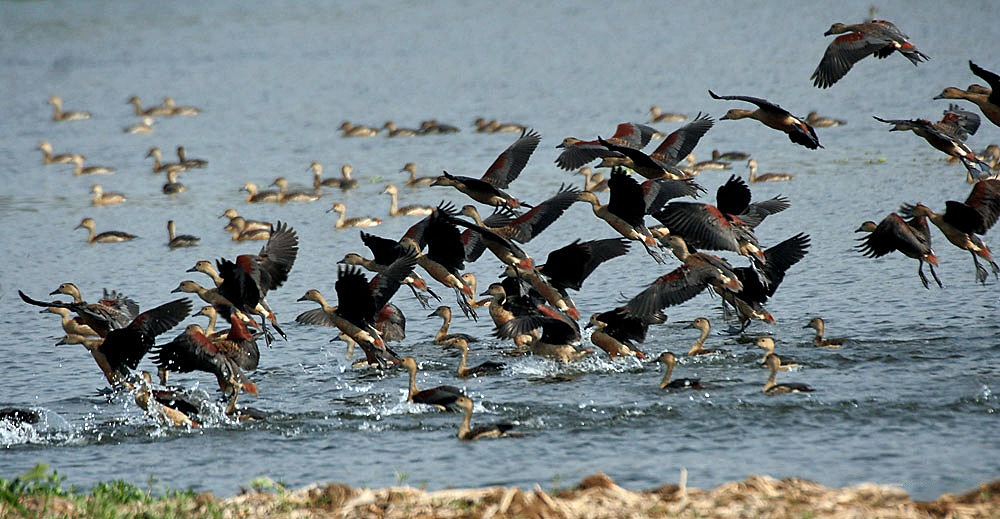
A flock landing (Kolkata, India)

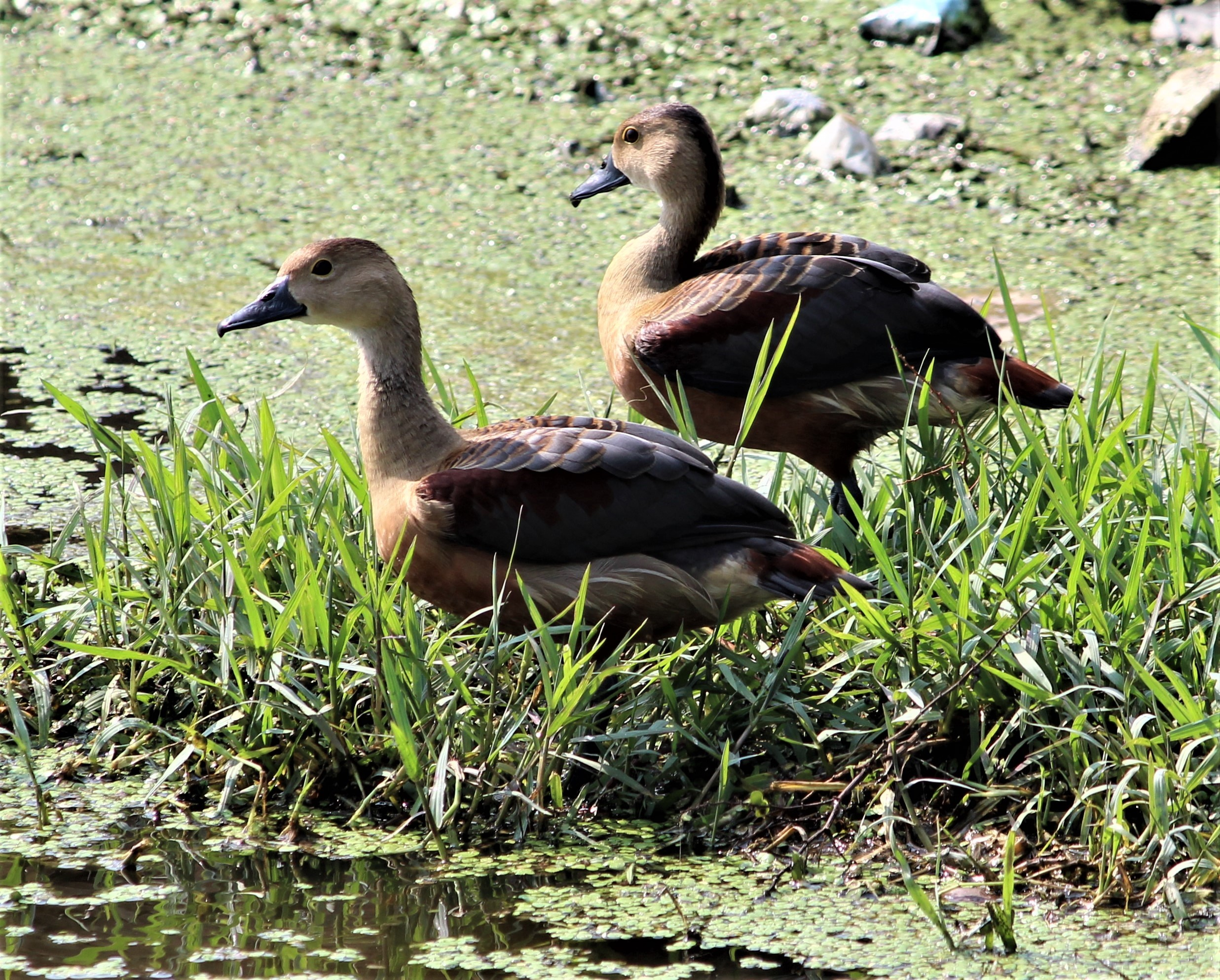
Lesser whistling ducks near Chandigarh.

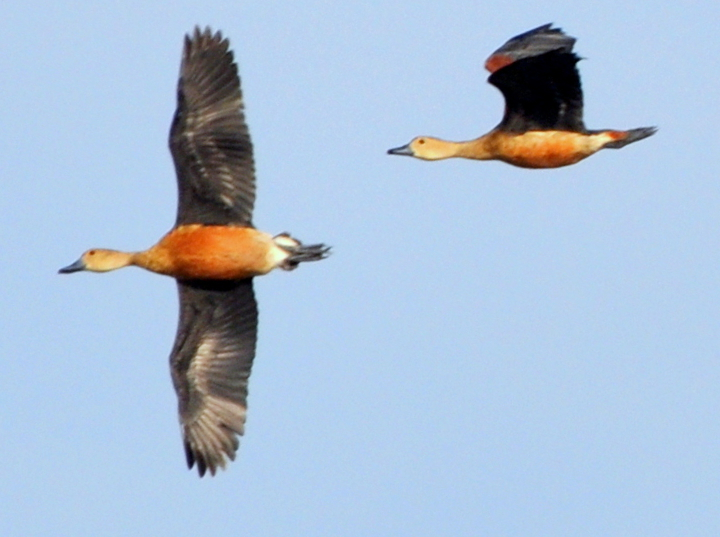
In flight the broad wings are distinctive

Lesser whistling duck are usually gregarious. They feed mainly on plants taken from the water as well as grains from cultivated rice apart from small fish, frogs and invertebrates such as molluscs and worms. They dabble as well as dive in water. They will often waddle on the land and common mynas have been noted to follow them on grass. Courtship involves the male facing the female and dipping and raising its bill in the water and swimming around the female. They breed during the monsoon or rainy season and may vary locally in relation to the food availability. The nest site may be a tree hole lined with twigs and grass or built in the fork of a large tree, sometimes reusing an old nest of a kite or heron or even on the ground. The clutch varies from 7 to 12 white eggs that are incubated by both the parents. Large clutches of up to 17 have been noted although these may be indications of intraspecific brood parasitism. The eggs hatch after about 22–24 days. More than one brood may be raised in a single season. Young birds may sometimes be carried on the back of the parents.

Local names like sili and silhahi in India are based on their wheezy two-note calls. They become very tame in captivity, walking about and responding to whistles. Individuals in captivity in the USA have lived for up to 9 years.

Several endoparasitic cestodes including Hymenolepis javanensis and Cittotaenia sandgroundi have been described from lesser whistling duck hosts apart from ectoparasitic bird lice and mites.
