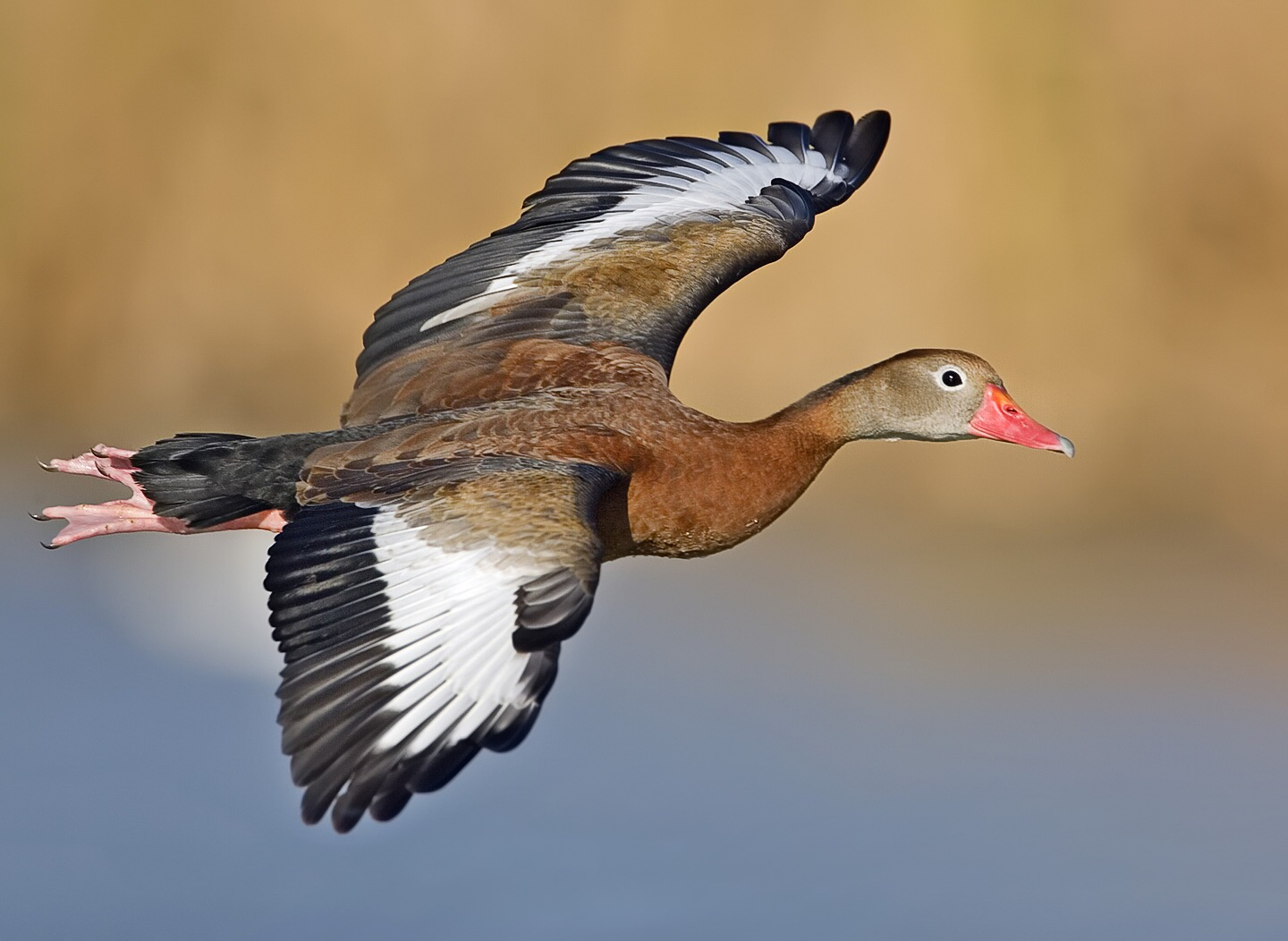
- Black-bellied whistling duck

Scientific classification
- Kingdom: Animalia
- Phylum: Chordata
- Class: Aves
- Order: Anseriformes
- Family: Anatidae
- Subfamily: Dendrocygninae; Reichenbach, 1850
- Genus: Dendrocygna; Swainson, 1837

Type species
- Anas arcuata Horsfield, 1824

= Whistling duck =

Whistling ducks

Subfamily of birds

The whistling ducks or tree ducks are a subfamily, Dendrocygninae, of the duck, goose and swan family of birds, Anatidae. In other taxonomic schemes, they are considered a separate family, Dendrocygnidae. Some taxonomists list only one genus, Dendrocygna, which contains eight living species, and one undescribed extinct species from Aitutaki of the Cook Islands, but other taxonomists also list the white-backed duck (Thalassornis leuconotus) under the subfamily.

== Taxonomy and evolution ==
Whistling ducks were first described by Carl Linnaeus in the 10th edition of Systema Naturae in 1758: the black-bellied whistling duck (then Anas autumnalis) and the West Indian whistling duck (then Anas arborea). In 1837, William Swainson named the genus Dendrocygna to distinguish whistling ducks from the other waterfowl. The type species was listed as the wandering whistling duck (D. arcuata), formerly named by Thomas Horsfield as Anas arcuata.

Whistling duck taxonomy, including that of the entire order Anseriformes, is complicated and disputed. Under a traditional classification proposed by ornithologist Jean Théodore Delacour based on morphological and behavioral traits, whistling ducks belong to the tribe Dendrocygnini under the family Anatidae and subfamily Anserinae. Following the revisions by ornithologist Paul Johnsgard, Dendrocygnini includes the genus Thalassornis (the white-backed duck) under this system.

In 1997, Bradley C. Livezey proposed that Dendrocygna were a separate lineage from Anserinae, placing it and its tribe in its own subfamily, Dendrocygninae. Alternatively Charles Sibley and Jon Edward Ahlquist recommended placing Dendrocygna in its own family, Dendrocygnidae, which includes the genus Thalassornis.

Simplified Anseriformes phylogeny

- Anseriformes
  - Anhimidae (screamers)
  - - Anseranatidae (magpie-geese)
    - Anatidae
      - Dendrocygninae (whistling ducks)
      - - Anatinae (dabbling ducks)
        - - Anserinae (swans and true geese)
          - Oxyurinae (stiff-tailed ducks and allies)

Detailed Anatidae phylogeny

- Anatidae
  - (Lamprocygna)
    - D. autumnalis
    - D. viduata
  - - Thalassornis
    - - (Nesocygna)
        - D. arborea
        - D. guttata
      - - - - D. bicolor
            - D. eytoni
          - - - - D. arcuata
                - D. javanica
                - all Anserinae
                - Malacorhynchus, Nettapus, Oxyurinae, Salvadorina
                - Stictonetta
                - - other Anatinae
                  - other Anatidae

=== Species ===
Eight species of whistling duck are currently recognized in the genus Dendrocygna. However, Johnsgard considers the white-backed duck (Thalassornis leuconotus) from Africa and Madagascar to be distinct ninth species, a view first proposed in 1960 and initially supported by behavioral similarities. Later, similarities in anatomy, duckling vocalizations, and feather proteins gave additional support. Molecular analysis in 2009 also suggested that the white-backed duck was nested within the whistling duck clade. In addition to the extant species, subfossil remains of an extinct, undescribed species have been found on Aitutaki of the Cook Islands.

Genus Dendrocygna – Swainson, 1837 – eight species
Common name	Scientific name and subspecies	Range	Size and ecology	IUCN status and estimated population
West Indian whistling duck	Dendrocygna arborea (Linnaeus, 1758)	Cuba, the Cayman Islands, Antigua and Barbuda, Jamaica, Hispaniola (both the Dominican Republic and Haiti), and Puerto Rico.	Size: Length of 48 to 58 cm (19 to 23 in). The female weighs from 800 to 1,320 g (1.76 to 2.91 lb) and the male weighs from 760 to 1,240 g (1.68 to 2.73 lb) Habitat: Diet:	NT 6,000 - 15,000 ▼
Wandering whistling duck	Dendrocygna arcuata (Horsfield, 1824) Three subspecies: D. a. arcuata (Horsfield, 1824); D. a. australis (Reichenbach, 1850); D. a. pygmaea (Mayr, 1945)	Australia, the Philippines, Borneo, Indonesia, Papua New Guinea, and the Pacific Islands	Size: 54–60 cm in height and weigh on average 750 grams. Habitat: Diet:	LC ▼
Black-bellied whistling duck	Dendrocygna autumnalis (Linnaeus, 1758) Two subspecies: D. a. autumnalis (Linnaeus, 1758); D. a. fulgens (Friedmann, 1947)	southernmost United States, Mexico, and tropical Central to south-central South America	Size: Length ranges from 47 to 56 cm (19 to 22 in), body mass from 652 to 1,020 g (1.437 to 2.249 lb), and wingspan ranges from 76 to 94 cm (30 to 37 in). Habitat: Diet:	LC ▲
Fulvous whistling duck	Dendrocygna bicolor (Vieillot, 1816)	Mexico and South America, the West Indies, the southern United States, sub-Saharan Africa and the Indian subcontinent.	Size: 45–53 cm (18–21 in) long; the male weighs 748–1,050 g (26.4–37.0 oz), and the female averages marginally lighter at 712–1,000 g (25.1–35.3 oz) Habitat: Diet:	LC ▼
Plumed whistling duck	Dendrocygna eytoni (Eyton, 1838)	Australia.	Size: Measuring 42–60 cm (16.5–23.5 in) and weighing around one kilogram (2.2 lb) Habitat: Diet:	LC 66,700-667,000
Spotted whistling duck	Dendrocygna guttata (Schlegel, 1866)	Indonesia, New Guinea, Australia and the Philippines	Size: 43–50 cm tall. Males can weigh anywhere from 590g to 650g while females weigh 610g to 860g. Habitat: Diet:	LC 6,700 - 17,000
Lesser whistling duck	Dendrocygna javanica (Horsfield, 1821)	Indian subcontinent and Southeast Asia.	Size: Habitat: Diet:	LC 133,000-1,330,000 ▼
White-faced whistling duck	Dendrocygna viduata (Linnaeus, 1766)	sub-Saharan Africa and much of South America.	Size: Habitat: Diet:	LC 1,410,000-1,700,000 ▲

== Description ==
Whistling ducks are found in the tropics and subtropics. As their name implies, they have distinctive whistling calls.

The whistling ducks have long legs and necks, and are very gregarious, flying to and from night-time roosts in large flocks. Both sexes have the same plumage, and all have a hunched appearance and black underwings in flight.

After breeding and pairing with a female, male whistling ducks (especially within the Fulvous whistling duck species) will often help with the construction of nests and will take turns with the female incubating the eggs.
