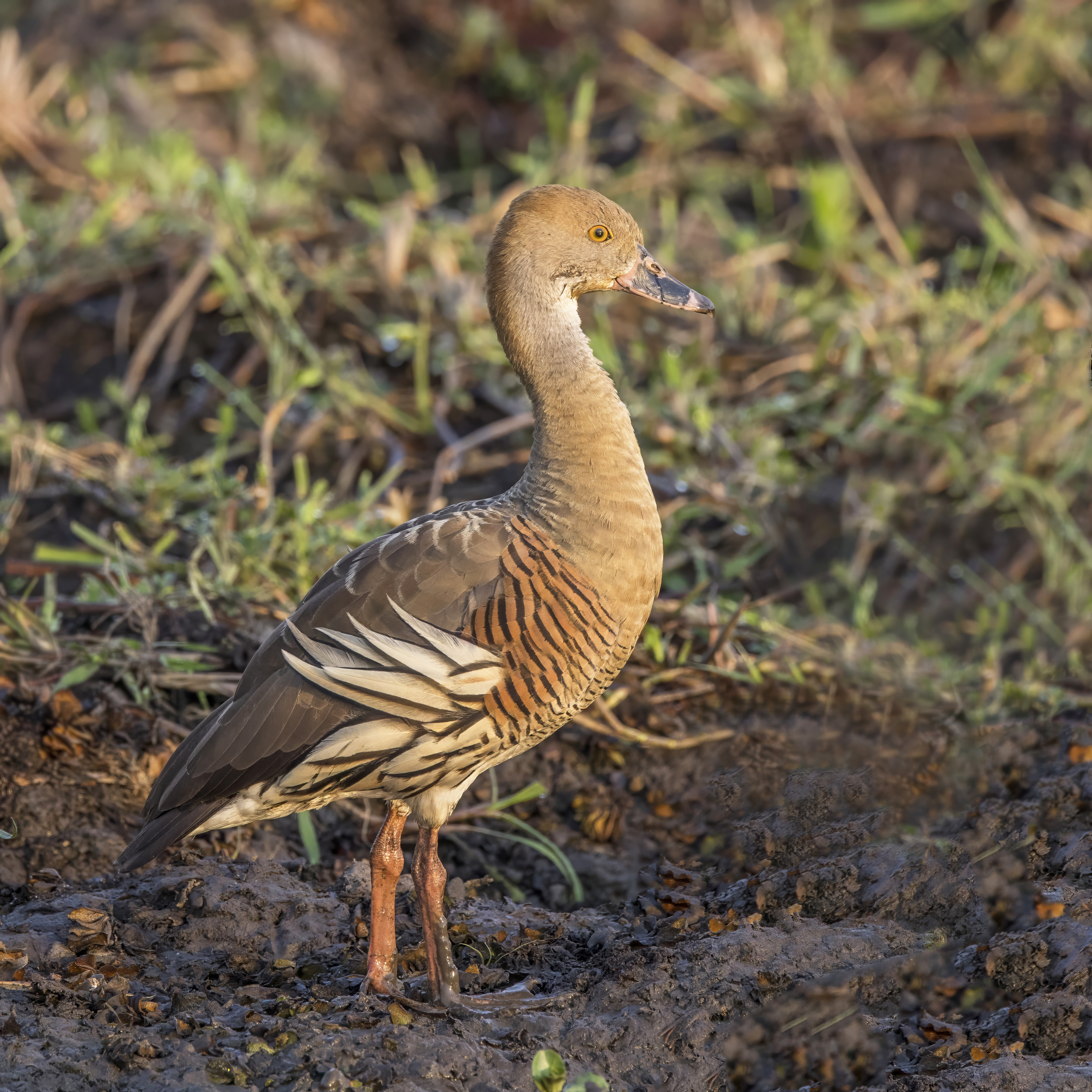
- Kakadu National Park, Northern Territory

Conservation status
- Least Concern (IUCN 3.1)

Scientific classification
- Kingdom: Animalia
- Phylum: Chordata
- Class: Aves
- Order: Anseriformes
- Family: Anatidae
- Genus: Dendrocygna
- Species: D. eytoni

Binomial name
- Dendrocygna eytoni (Eyton, 1838)
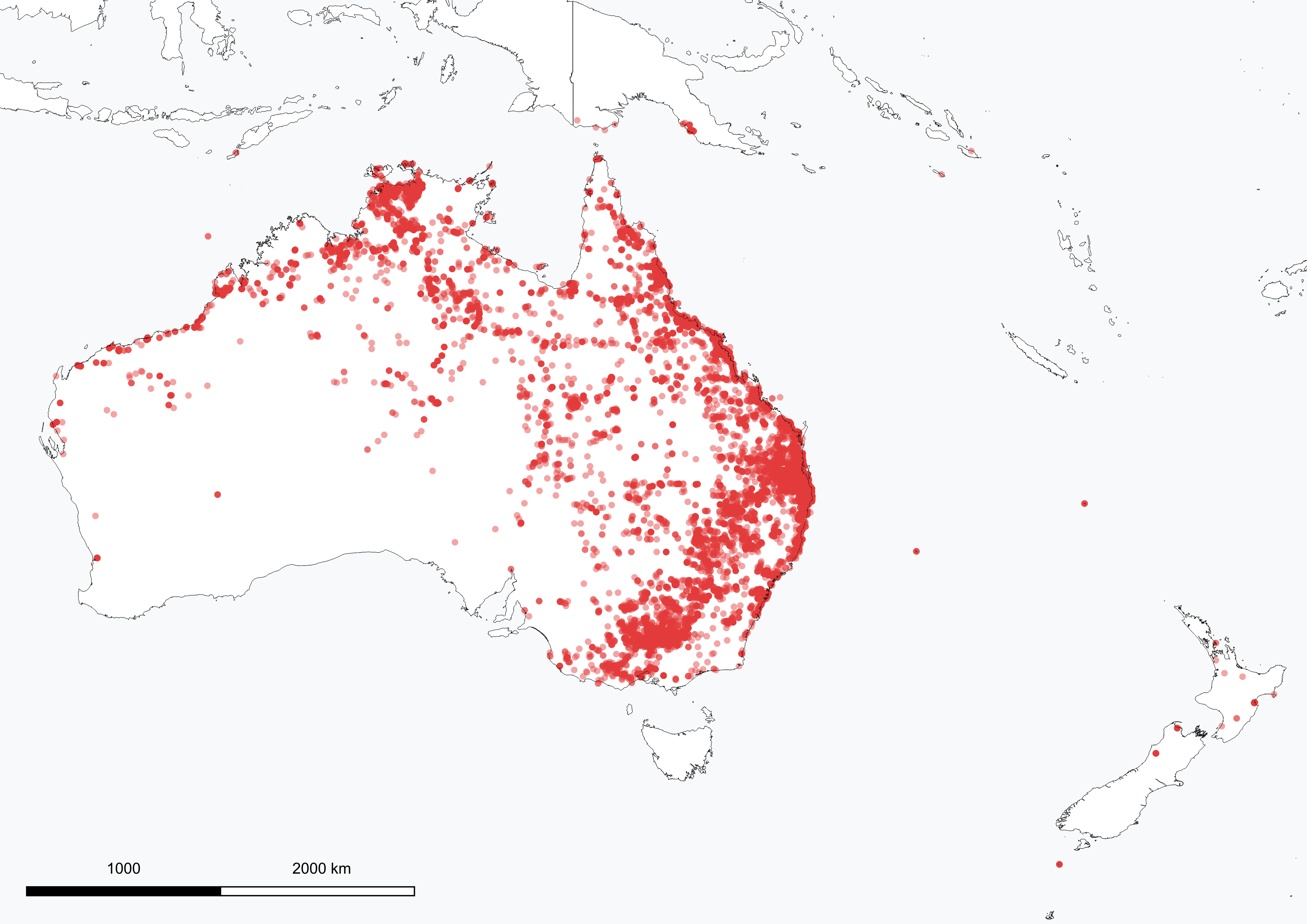
- Species distribution

Synonyms
- Leptotarsis eytoni Eyton, 1838 – original combination

= Plumed whistling duck =

Species of duck

The plumed whistling duck (Dendrocygna eytoni), also called the grass whistling duck, is a species of bird in the whistling duck subfamily of the family Anatidae. It is resident and breeds in Australia, in a broad arc covering the northern half and most of the eastern third of the continent. There are also non-breeding and seasonally uncertain populations in New Zealand, the Solomon Islands, Indonesia and Papua New Guinea. It is a predominantly brown-coloured duck with a long neck and characteristic plumes arising from its flanks. The sexes are similar in appearance.

== Taxonomy ==
Described by English naturalist Thomas Campbell Eyton in 1838, its specific epithet honours its namer. Its generic name is derived from the Ancient Greek terms dendron "tree", and kuknos (via Latin cygnus) "swan". Alternate common names include; Eyton's plumed, red-legged or whistling tree-duck, and grey or red-legged whistler.

== Description ==
Measuring 42–60 cm (16.5–23.5 in) and weighing around one kilogram (2.2 lb), it is a long-necked duck with brown upperparts, paler underparts and a white rump. The chest is a chestnut colour with thin black bars, while long black-margined plumes arise from its flanks. Its bill and legs are a pinkish red, and the iris of the eyes are yellow. The male and female are similar in appearance. The species has a characteristic lowered neck and short, dark, rounded wings while flying.

The call is a characteristic whistle, which gives the bird its common name.

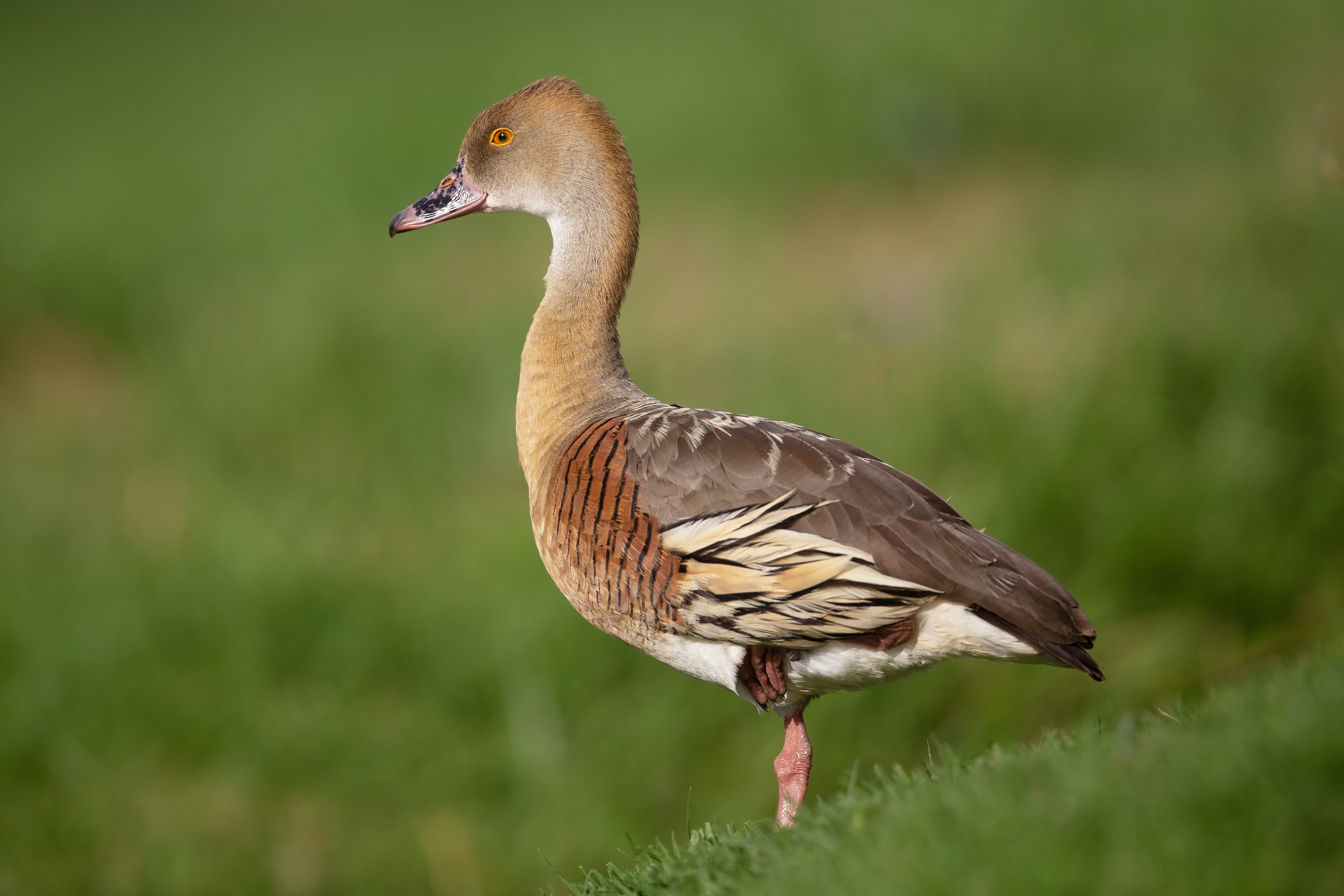
New South Wales, Australia

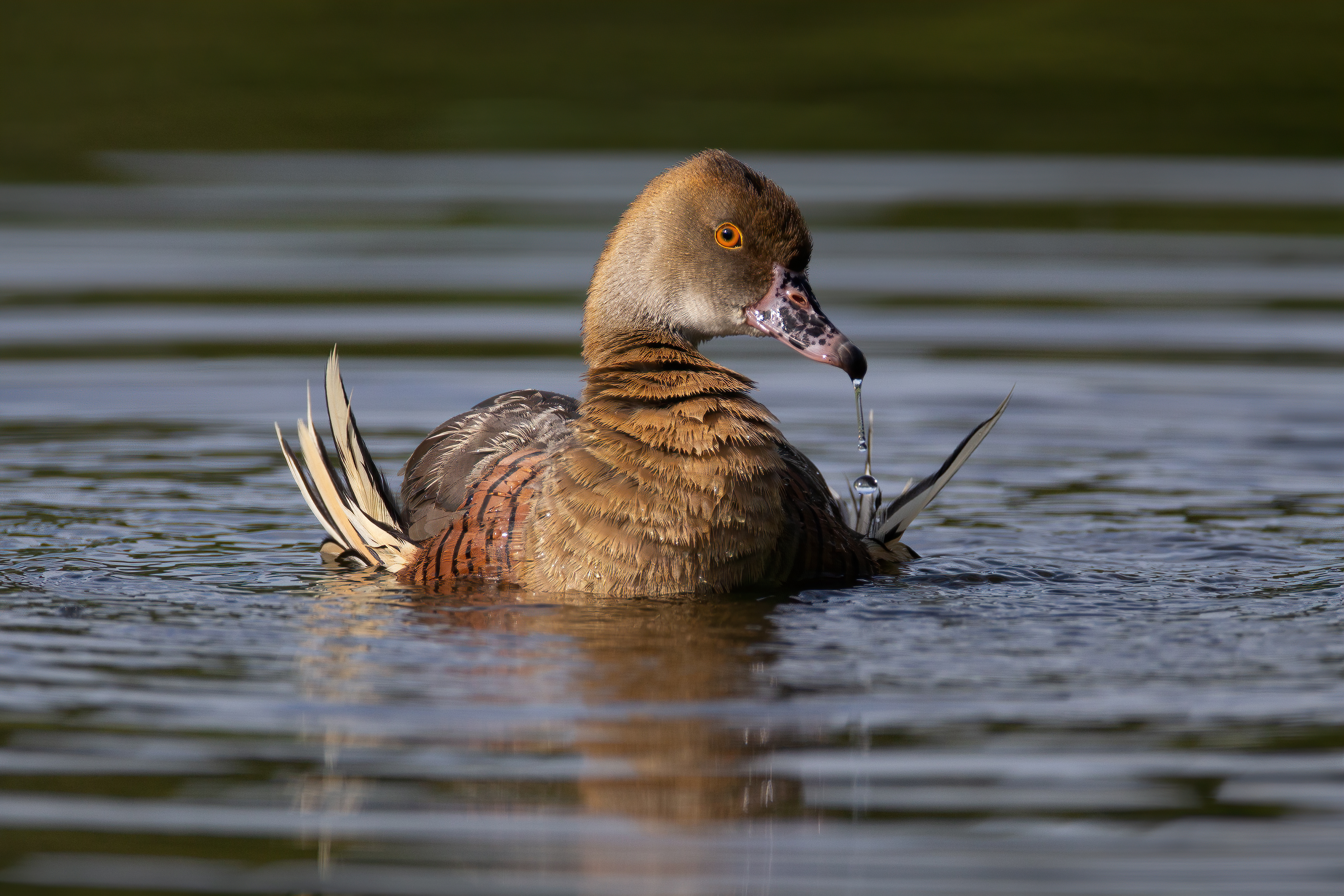
Swimming with plumes visible

Gatton, SE Queensland, Australia

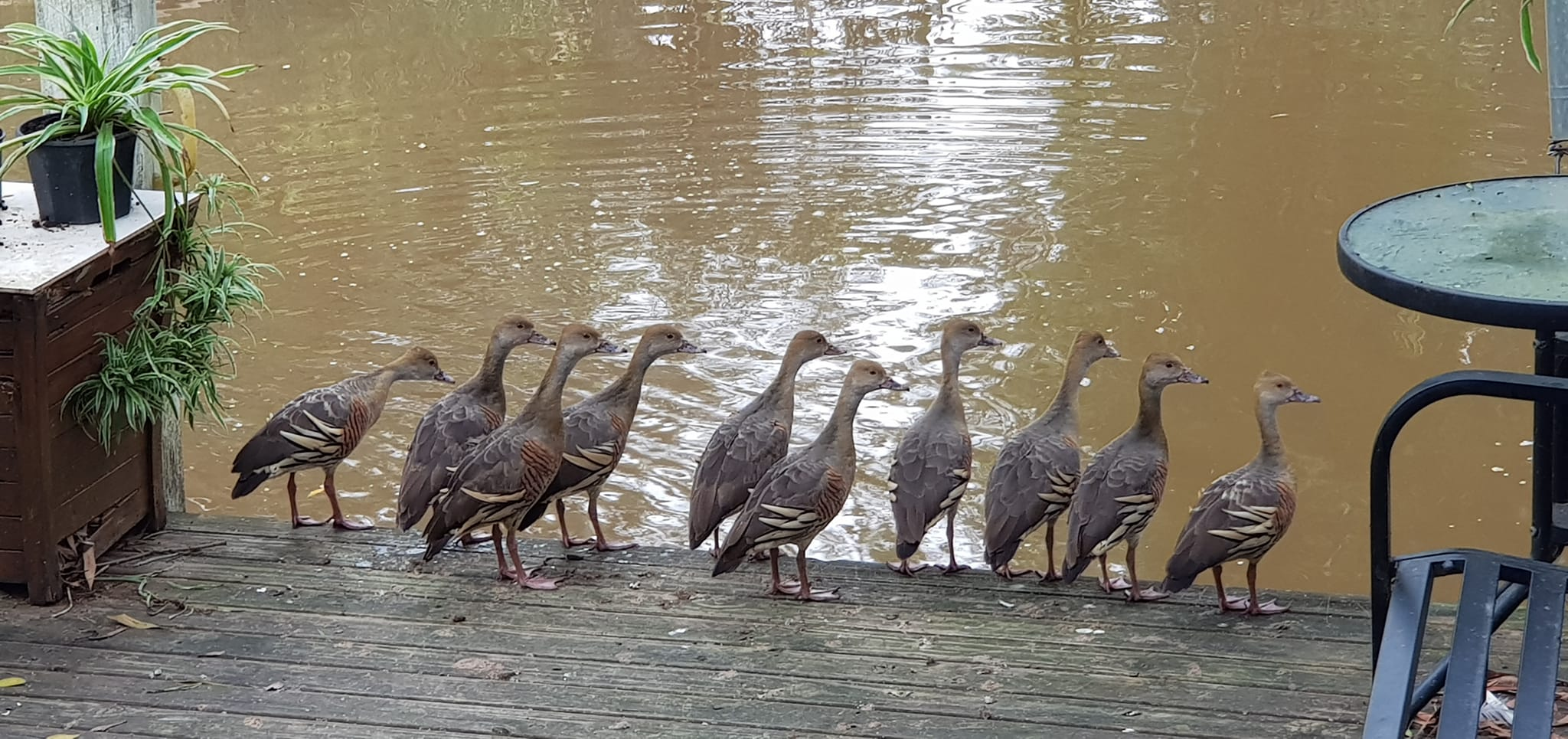
Group of plumed whistling ducks

== Distribution and habitat ==
The plumed whistling duck has a range across the eastern, northern and central parts of Australia from the Kimberley across the Top End and Cape York, down to southern Queensland and northern New South Wales on the east coast, although may reach north-western Victoria inland, in the vicinity of the Murray River. It is also found in New Guinea. The preferred habitat is tall grassland and savanna, often near bodies of water.

== Feeding ==
Rather than diving for food in bodies of water like other ducks, the plumed whistling duck feeds by cropping grass on land.

== Breeding ==
The plumed whistling duck breeds during the wet season, generally in January to March, although it can be later in April or, in a few cases, May. One brood is raised per season. The nest is a mattress of grasses or similar material in tall grass, or in or near vegetation as cover. Ten to 12 oval eggs are laid, measuring 48 by 36 millimetres (1.9 in × 1.4 in); 14 or more have been recorded on occasion. Initially shiny and creamy-coloured, they may become stained. The incubation period is around 30 days.
