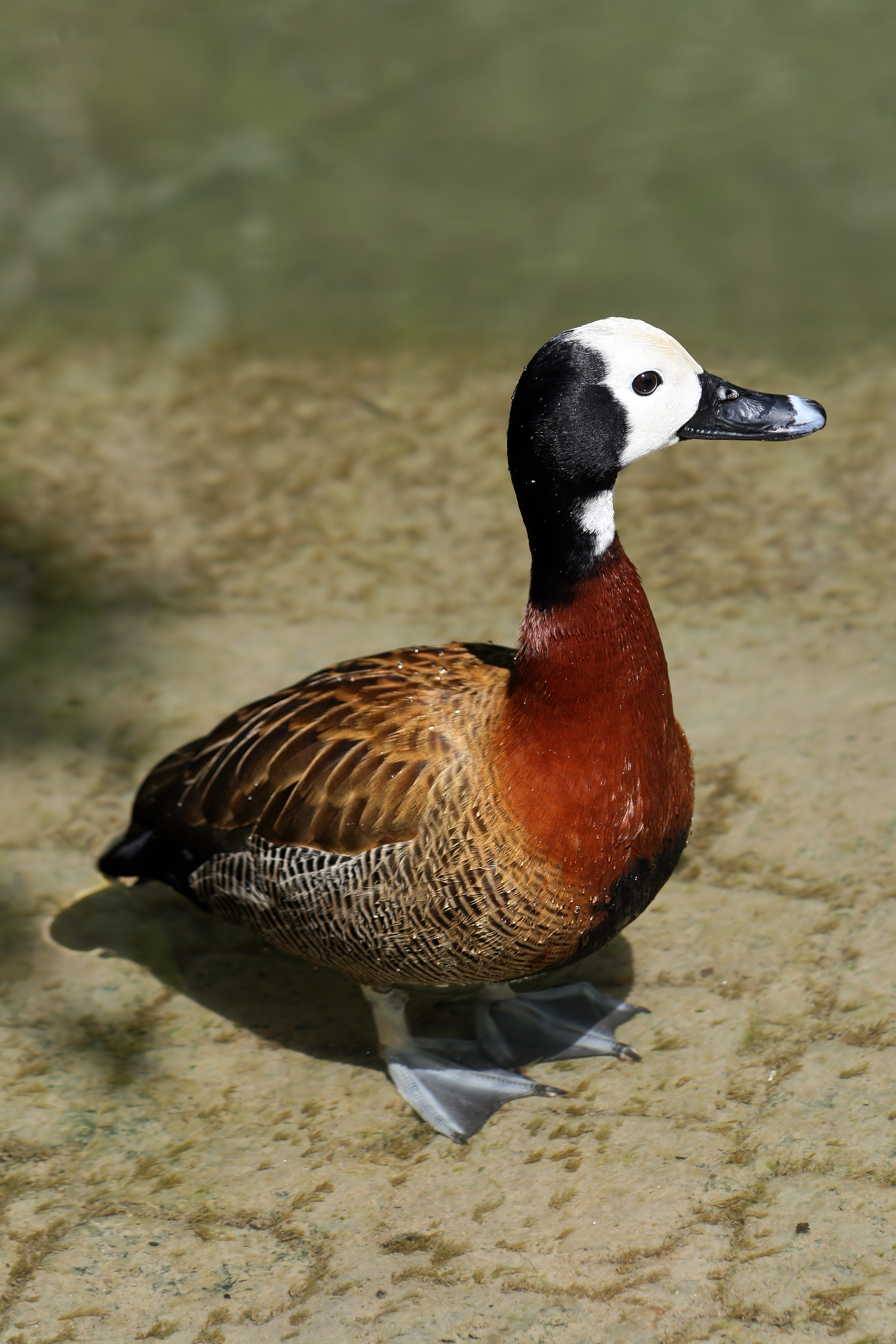

Conservation status
- Least Concern (IUCN 3.1)

Scientific classification
- Kingdom: Animalia
- Phylum: Chordata
- Class: Aves
- Order: Anseriformes
- Family: Anatidae
- Genus: Dendrocygna
- Species: D. viduata

Binomial name
- Dendrocygna viduata (Linnaeus, 1766)
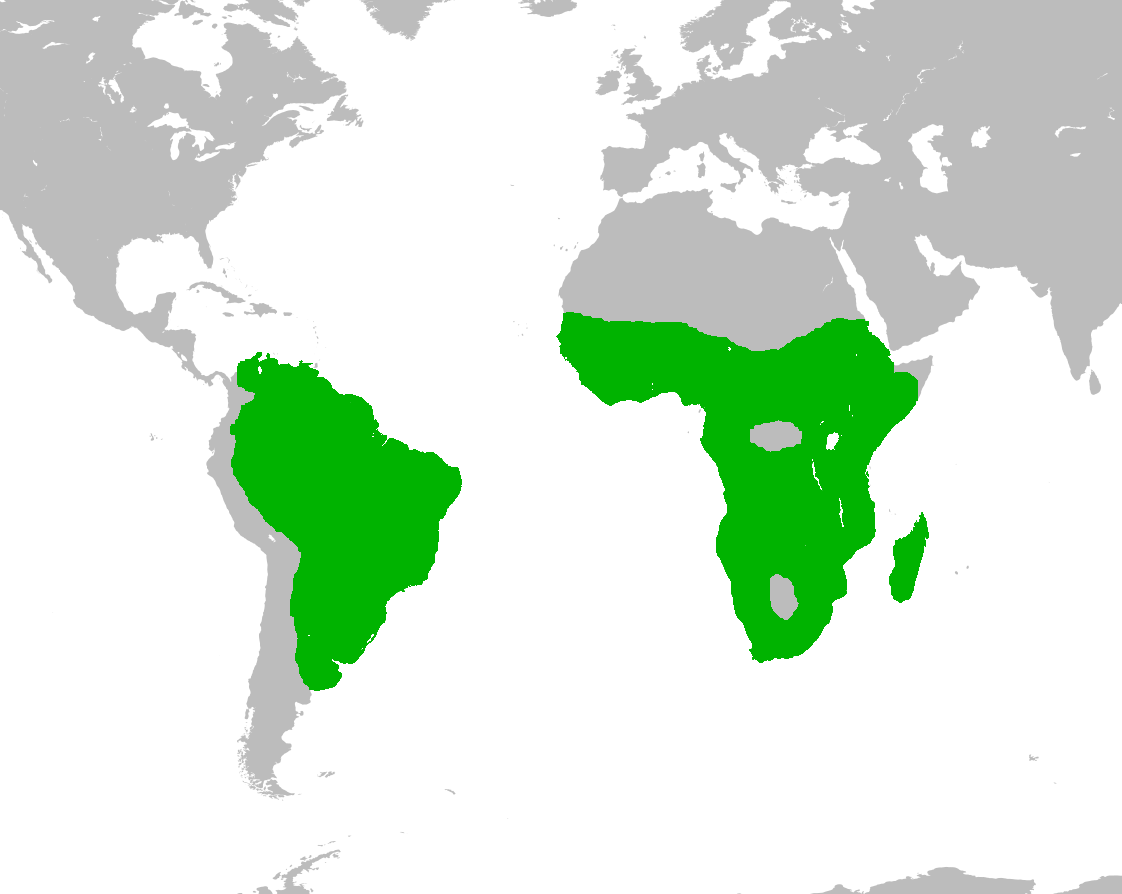
- Range

Synonyms
- Anas viduata Linnaeus, 1766 (protonym)

Audio
- Three-note whistling call

= White-faced whistling duck =

Species of bird

The white-faced whistling duck (Dendrocygna viduata) is a whistling duck that breeds in sub-Saharan Africa and much of South America.

This species is gregarious, and the flocks of a thousand or more arrive at dawn at favored sites. As the name implies, these are noisy birds with a clear three-note whistling call.

== Taxonomy ==
The white-faced whistling duck was formally described by the Swedish naturalist Carl Linnaeus in the 1766 twelfth edition of his Systema Naturae, under the binomial name Anas viduata. He specified the type locality as Cartagena in Colombia. The white-faced whistling duck is now one of eight species placed in the genus Dendrocygna that was introduced in 1837 by the English naturalist William Swainson. The species is considered as monotypic: no subspecies are recognised. The genus name combines the Ancient Greek dendron, meaning "tree", with the genus name Cygnus, meaning "swan" in Latin. The specific epithet viduata is Latin and means "widowed" or "in mourning".

== Description ==
The white-faced whistling duck has a long grey bill, a long head, and longish legs. It has a black neck and head, and a distinctive white face that gives it its name, though the amount of white color visible has regional variations among the species. For example, the white-faced whistling ducks with more black coloration are commonly found in western Africa where rainfall supersedes the dry season. The back and wings are dark brown to black, and the underparts are black with a fine white barring on the flanks. The neck is chestnut. Males and females have similar plumage. Juveniles are similar in color to adults but have a much less contrasted head pattern.

== Distribution and habitat ==
The white-faced whistling duck has a peculiar disjunctive distribution, occurring in Africa and South America. It has been suggested that they may have been transported to new locations worldwide by humans. The habitat is still freshwater lakes or reservoirs, with plentiful vegetation, where this duck feeds on seeds and other plant food.

Because of its large range, there are many common names for the white-faced whistling duck, including "irere" and "guiriri".

== Behaviour and ecology ==
This is an abundant species. It is largely resident, apart from local movements which can be 100 km or more.

=== Breeding ===
The nest site is a depression in the ground or in reed beds. The clutch is 6 to 12 eggs which are incubated by both sexes. The eggs hatch after 26 to 28 days. Both sexes attend the ducklings and usually keep them hidden in reeds. The chicks have dark down above and yellow down below. They fledge after two months.

== Conservation ==
The white-faced whistling duck is one of the species to which the Agreement on the Conservation of African-Eurasian Migratory Waterbirds (AEWA) applies.

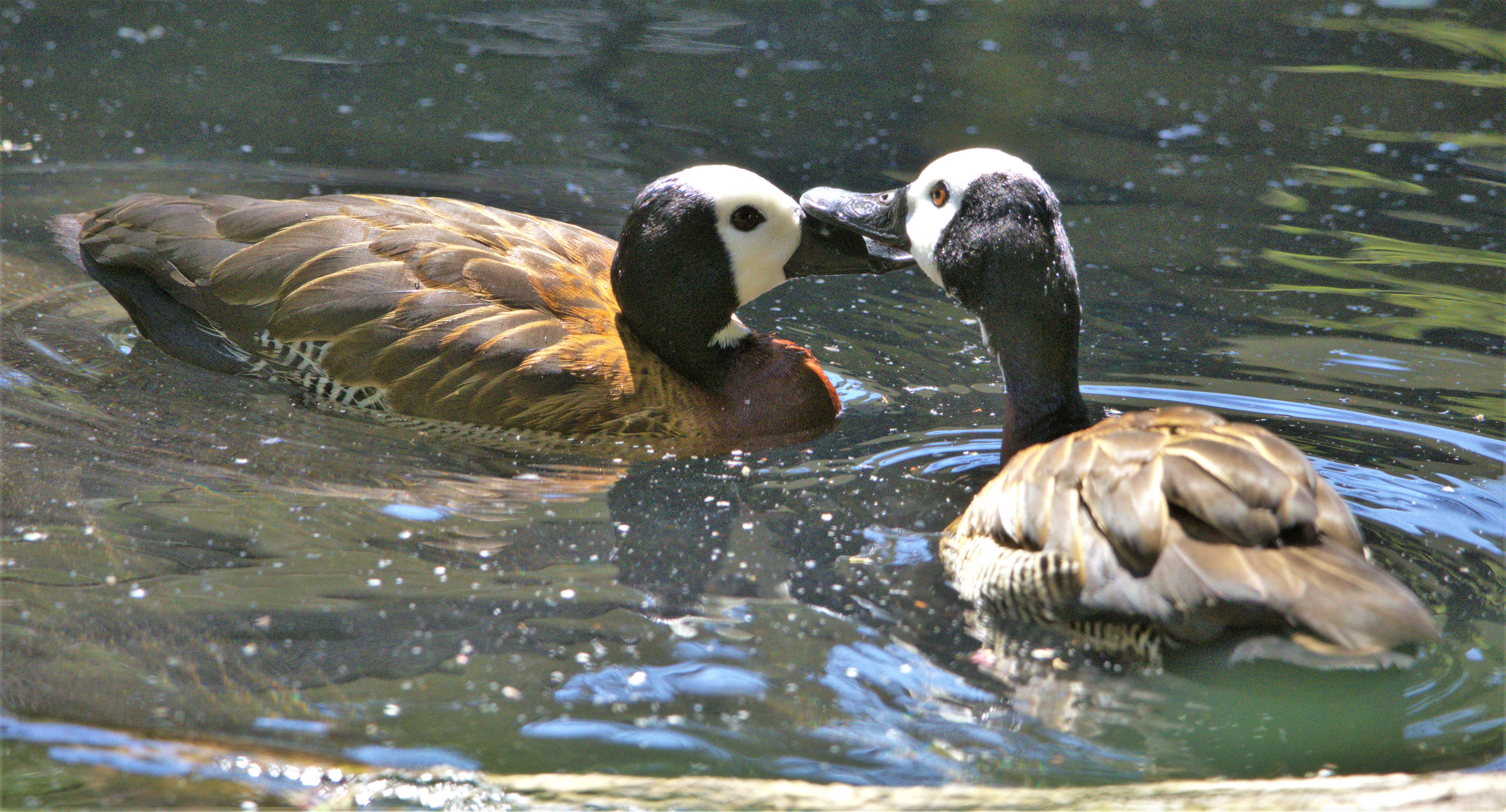
Mated pair of White-Faced ducks

== Gallery ==
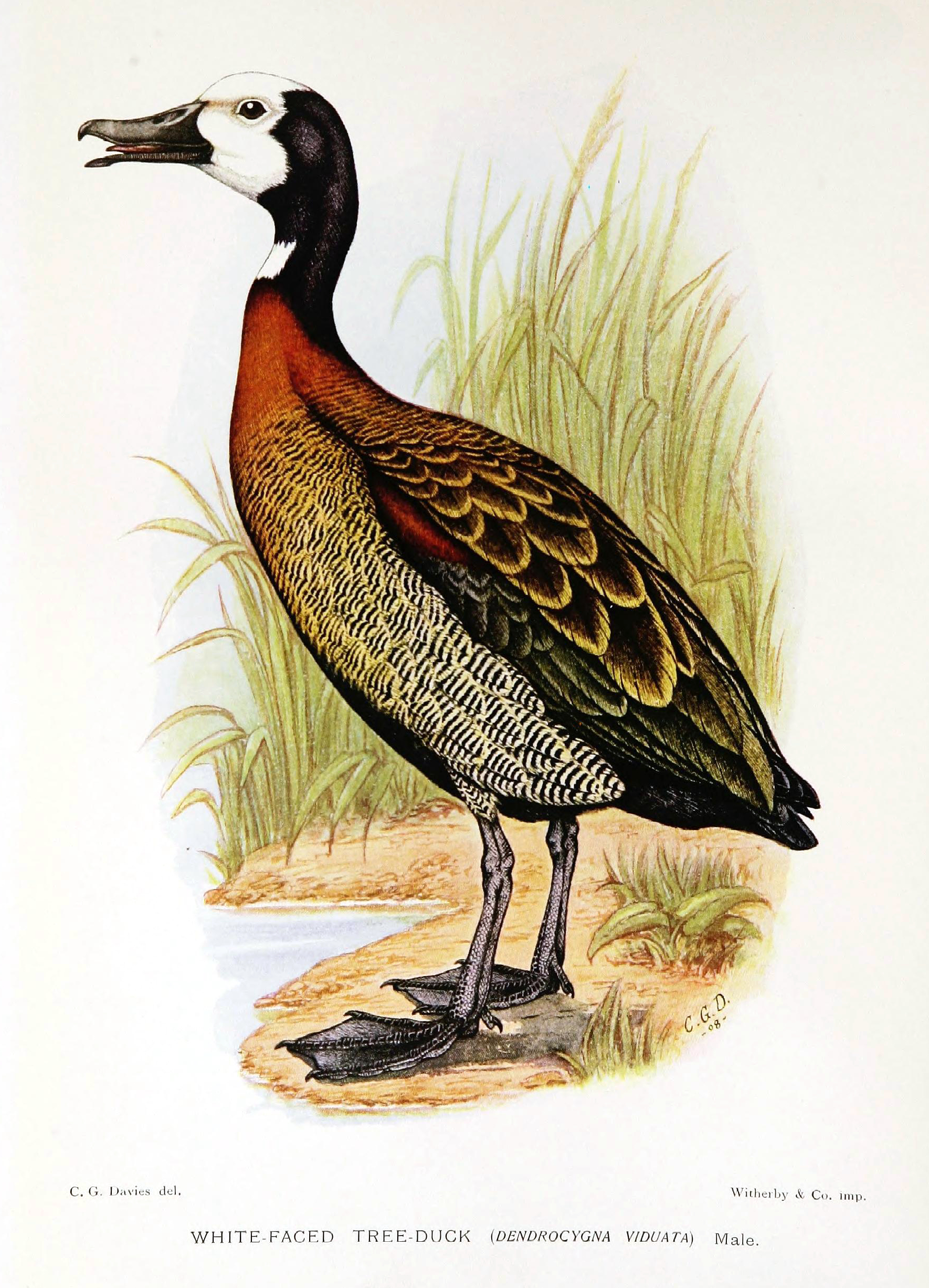

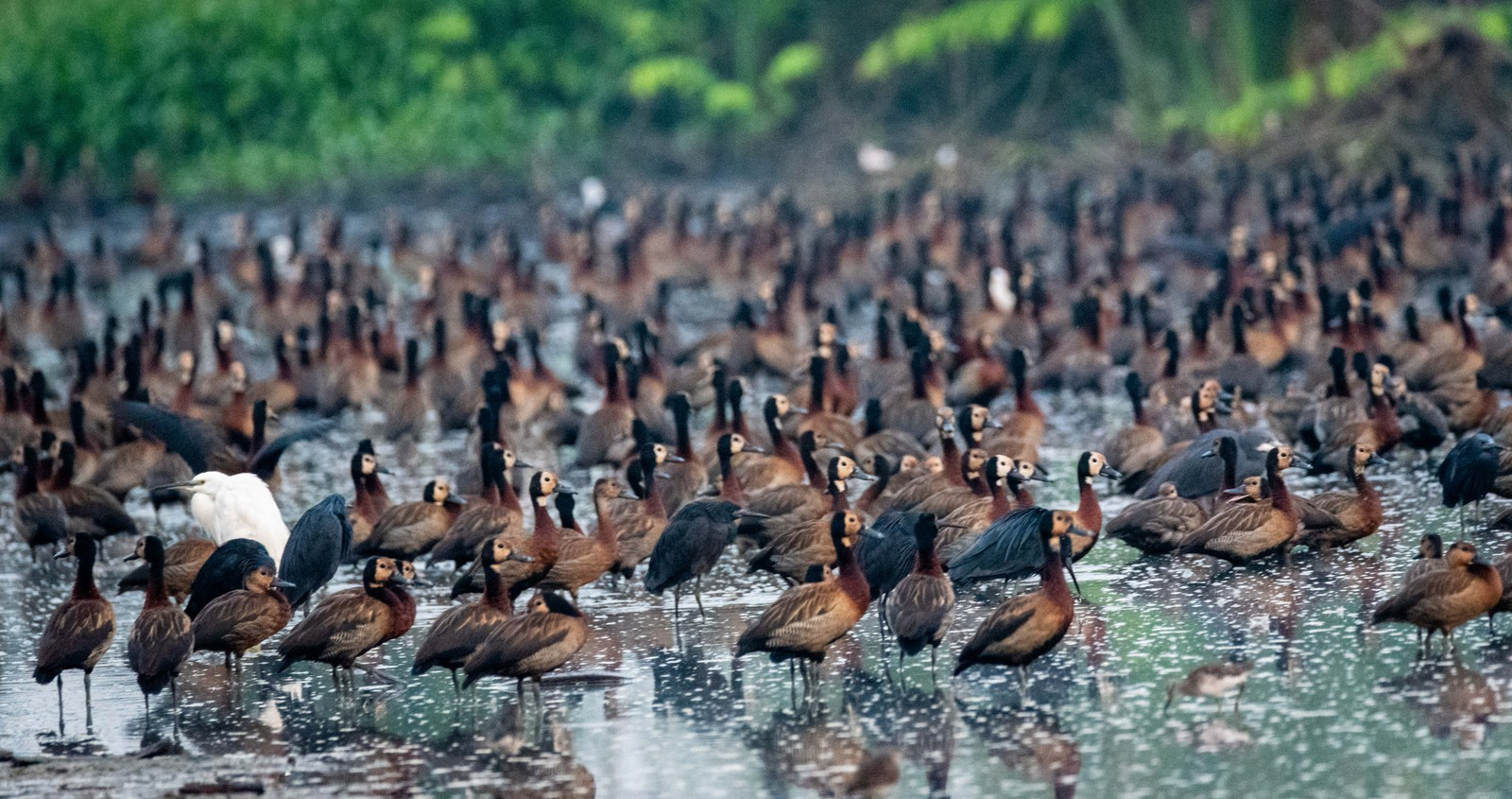

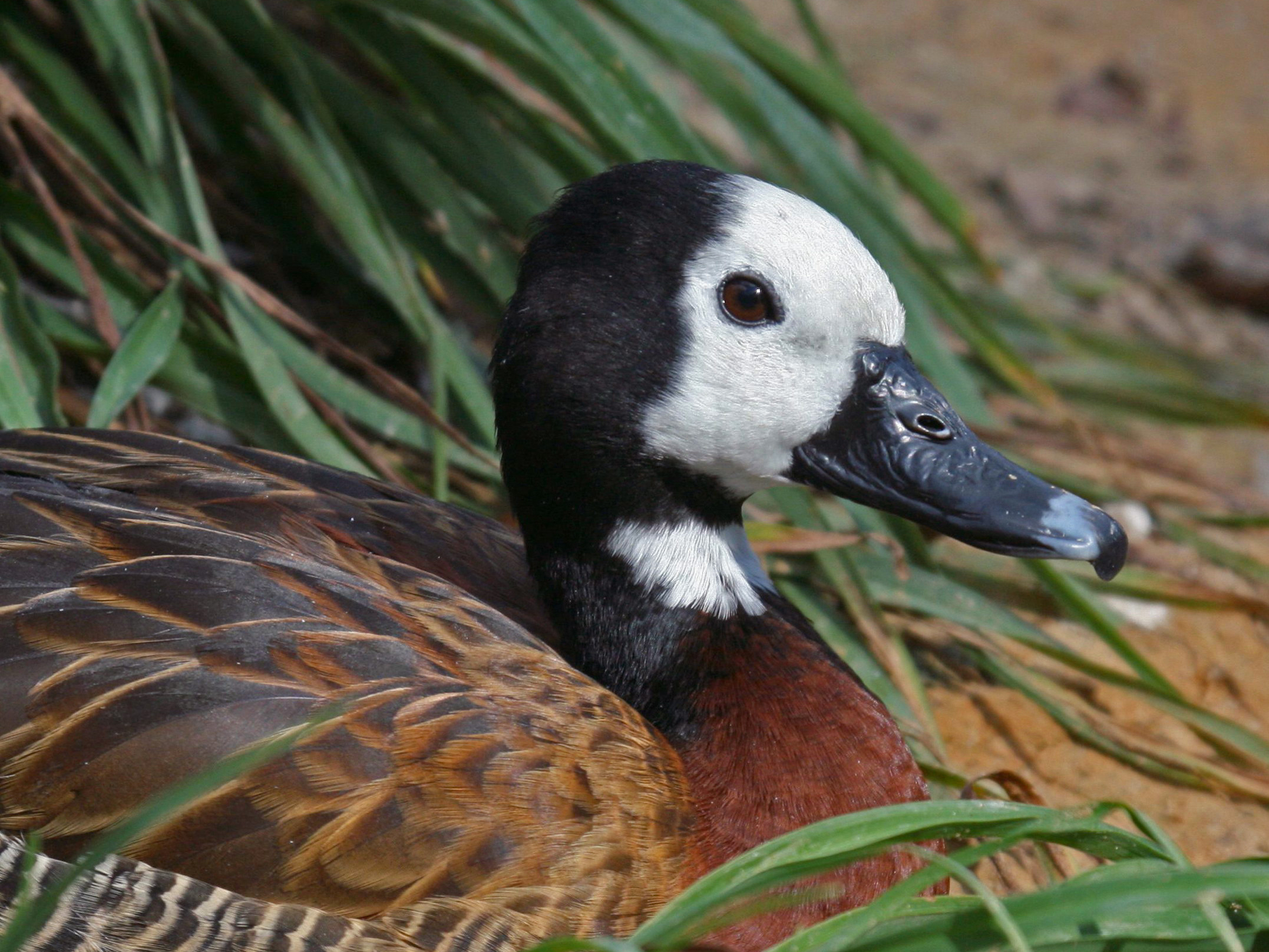

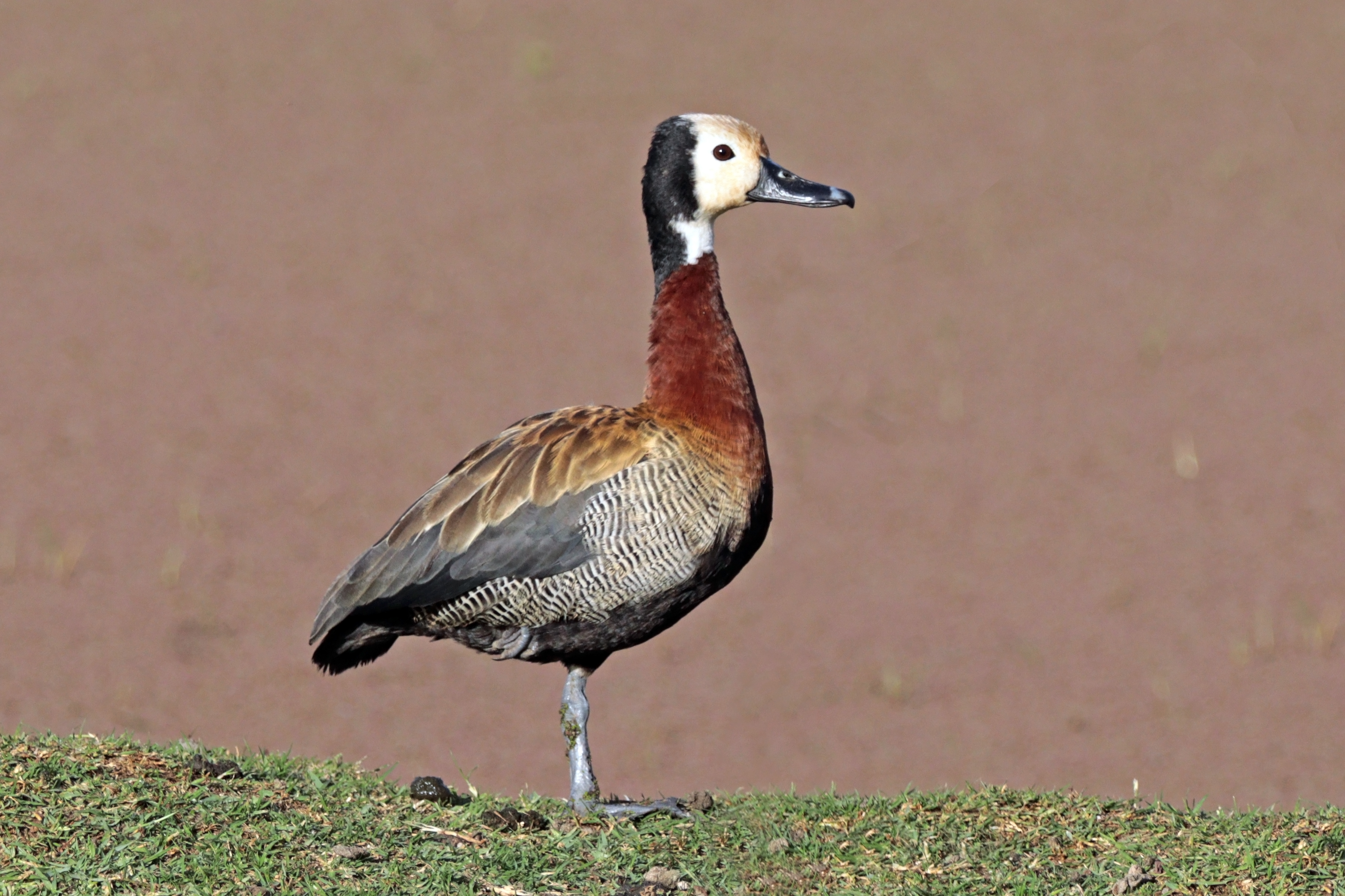
subadult

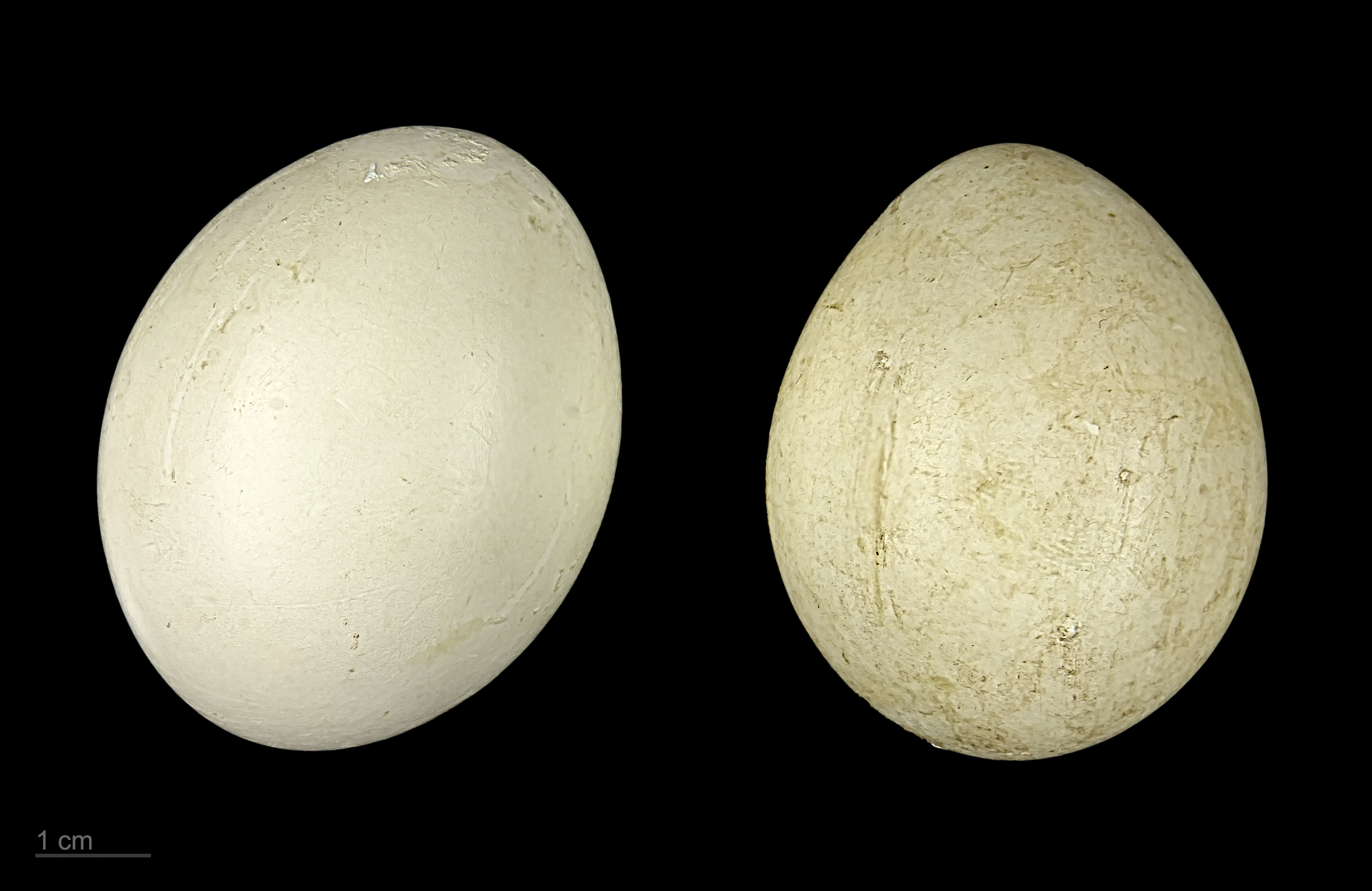
Dendrocygna viduata - MHNT
