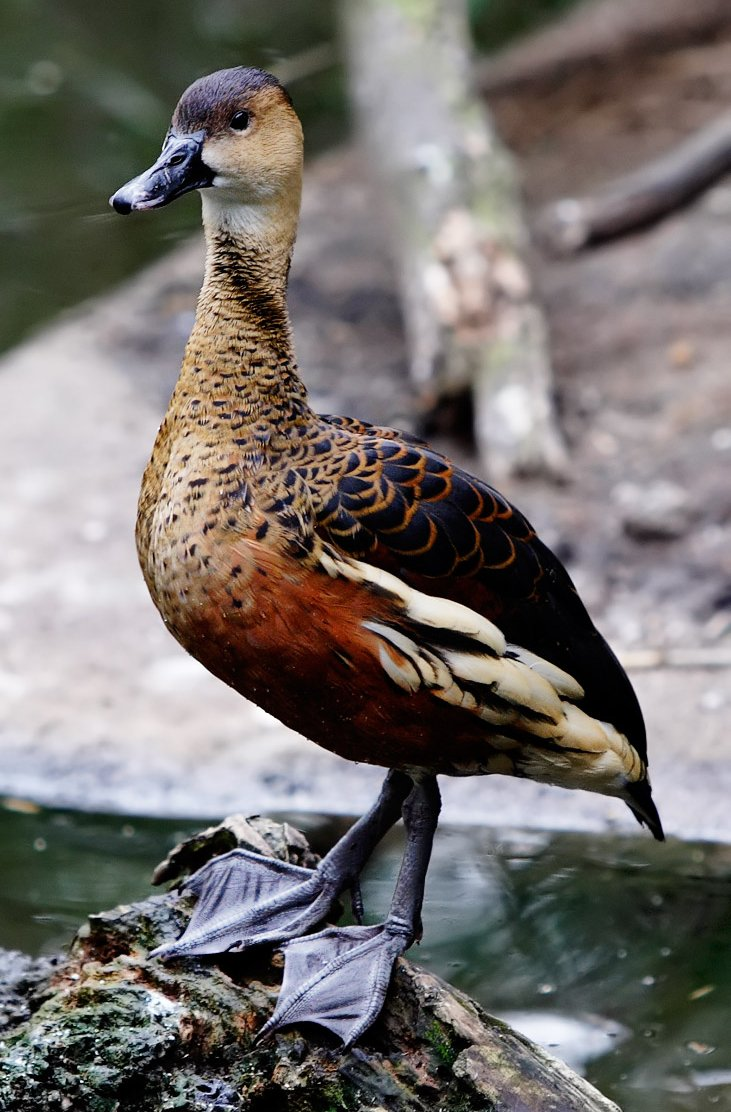
- At Melbourne Zoo, Australia

Conservation status
- Least Concern (IUCN 3.1)

Scientific classification
- Kingdom: Animalia
- Phylum: Chordata
- Class: Aves
- Order: Anseriformes
- Family: Anatidae
- Genus: Dendrocygna
- Species: D. arcuata

Binomial name
- Dendrocygna arcuata (Horsfield, 1824)

Subspecies
- D. a. arcuata (Indonesian wandering whistling duck) (Horsfield, 1824); D. a. australis (Australian wandering whistling duck) (Reichenbach, 1850); D. a. pygmaea (New Britain wandering whistling duck) (Mayr, 1945)
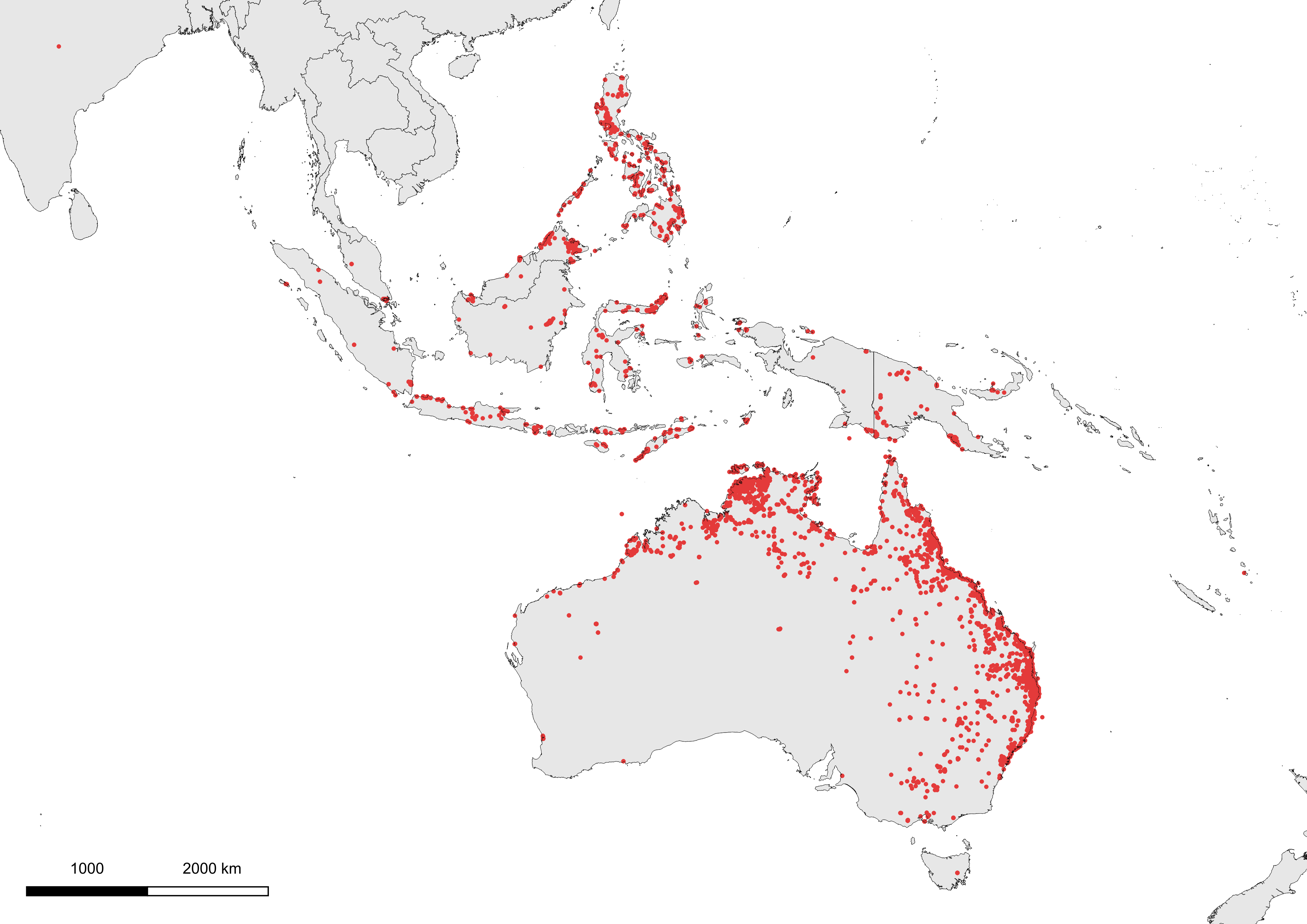
- Species distribution

= Wandering whistling duck =

Species of bird

The wandering whistling duck (Dendrocygna arcuata) is a species of whistling duck. They inhabit tropical and subtropical Australia, the Philippines, Borneo, Indonesia, Papua New Guinea, Timor-Leste, and the Pacific Islands.

== Taxonomy ==
There are three subspecies associated with this bird, D. a. arcuata (Indonesian wandering whistling duck), D. a. australis (Australian wandering whistling duck), and D. a. pygmaea (New Britain wandering whistling duck).

== Description ==
Formerly named tree ducks, the wandering whistling duck has its new name because of their loud whistling calls and the whistling noise their wings make during flight. They have long necks and legs and look like a cross between a goose and a duck. They have a strong head and neck with a darker crown and hindneck. The breast contains black spotting and the feathers are mostly dark brown. They range in size from 54–60 cm in height and weigh on average 750 grams. They mainly feed on grasses, waterlilies, water plants and occasionally insects and aquatic vertebrae.

== Habitat ==
The wandering whistling duck lives in deep lagoons, flooded grasslands or dams. They enjoy the water and rarely leave the shore. They can swim and dive with ease.

== Breeding ==
Breeding occurs during the tropical wet season usually between December and May. During this time six to fifteen eggs are laid in a nest not far from water and usually in high grass or a sheltered area.

== In Aboriginal language and culture ==
The Bininj people of western Arnhem Land call this animal djilikuybi in the Bininj Kunwok language, and hunt it for food. In the Kundjeyhmi dialect, it is known as djirrbiyuk, and there is an Aboriginal outstation in Kakadu National Park which is named Djirrbiyuk after this bird. In Yolŋu languages it is known as guyiyi or walkuli.

== Gallery ==
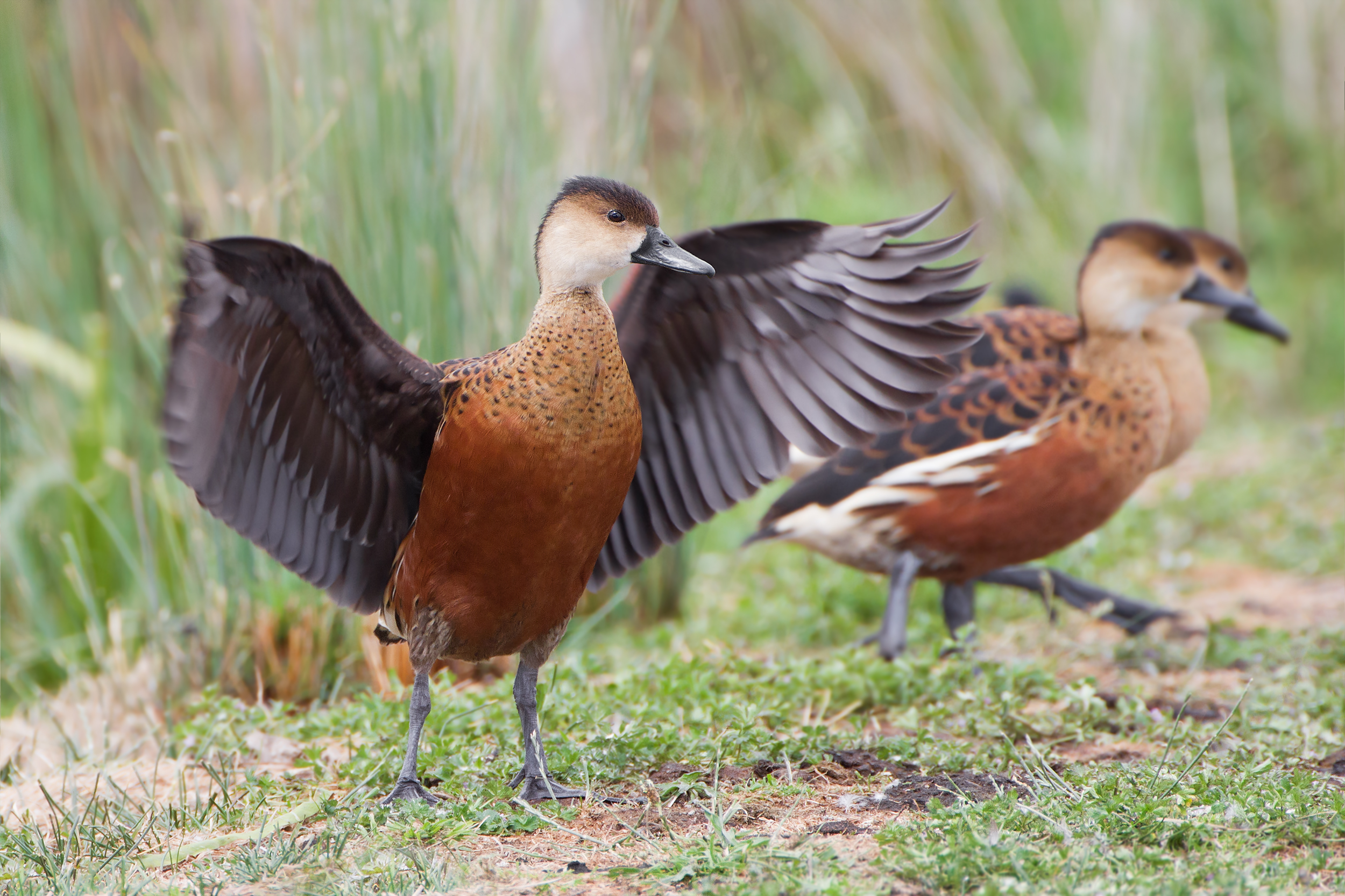

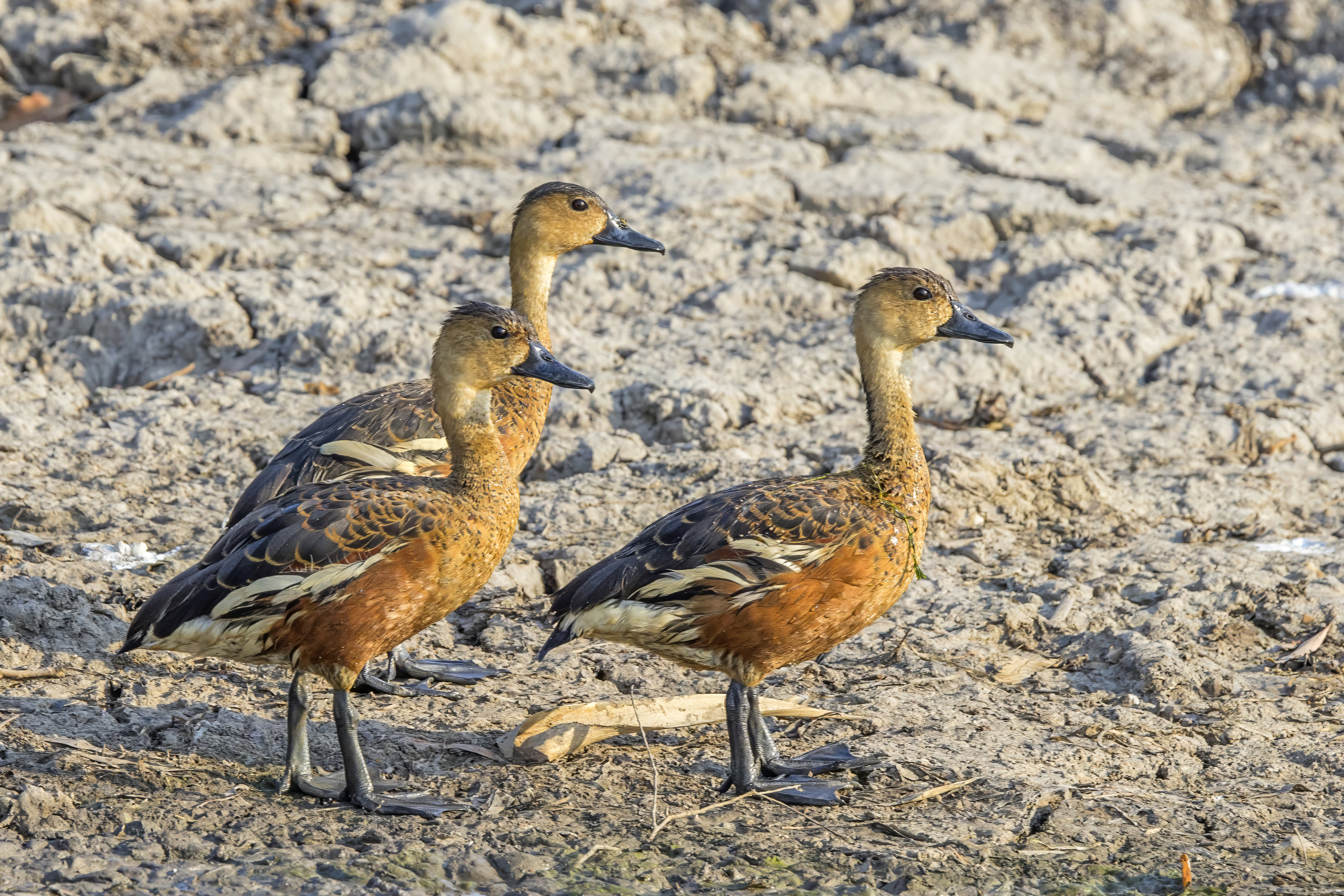

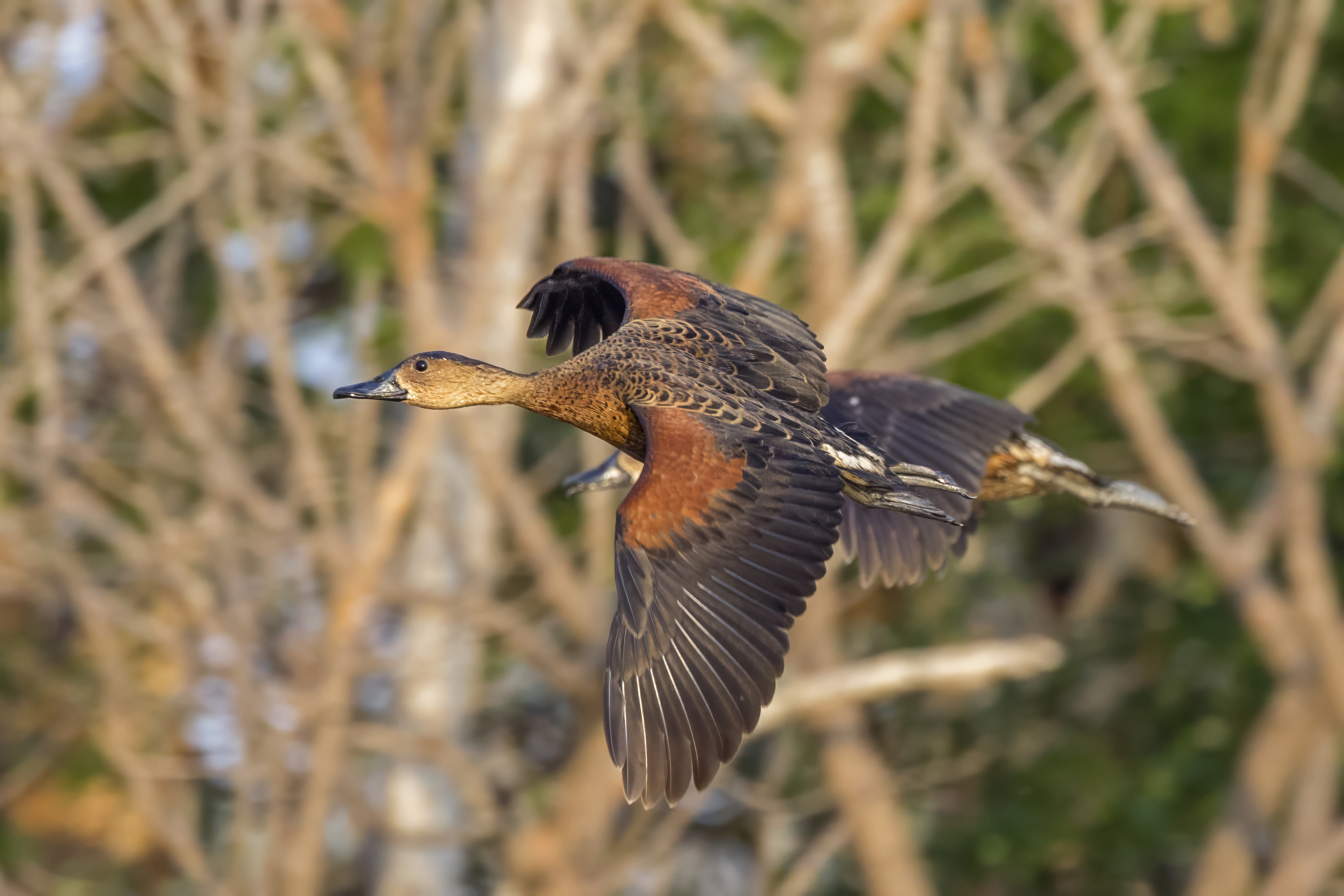

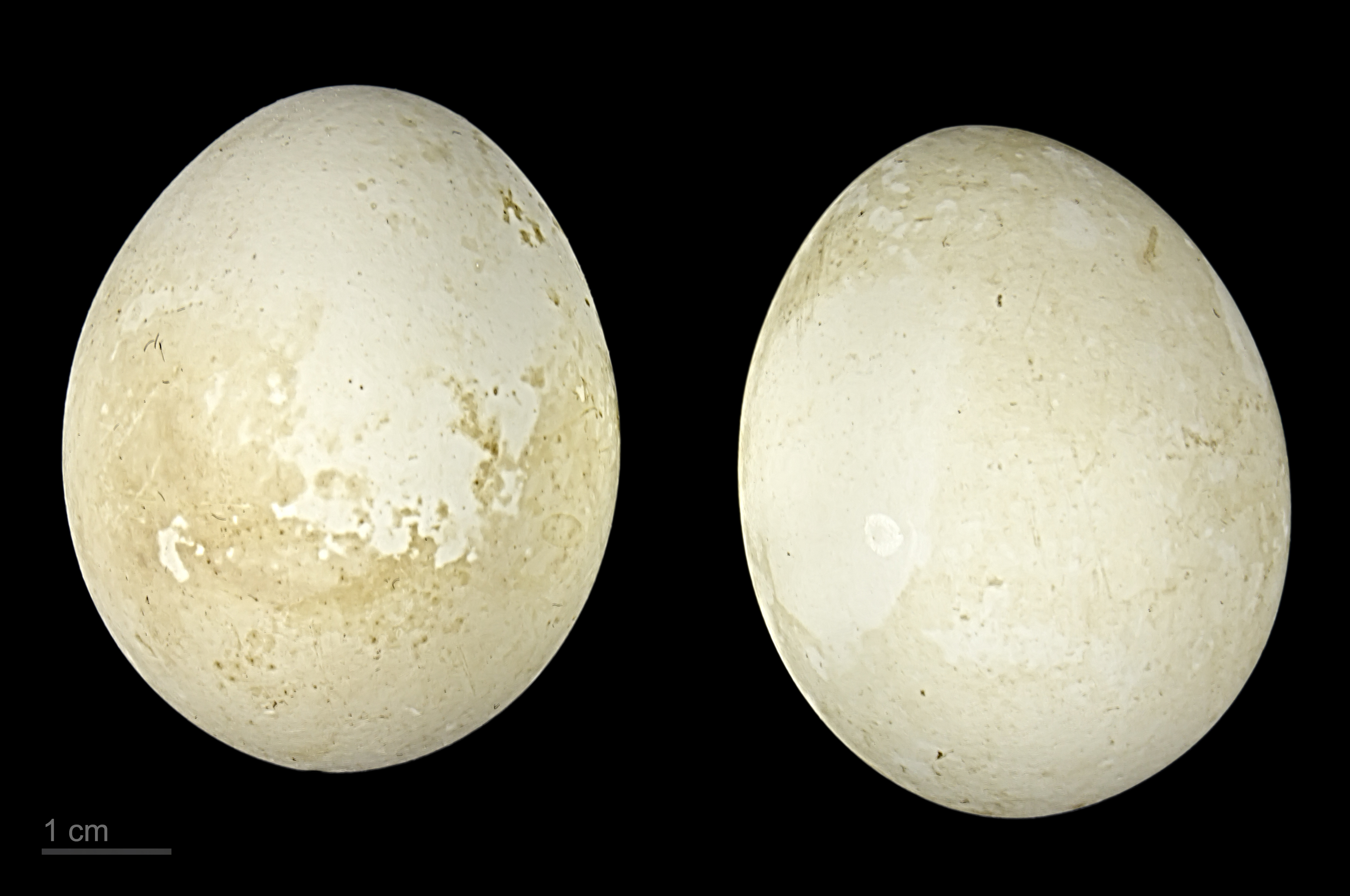
Eggs of Dendrocygna arcuata - MHNT
