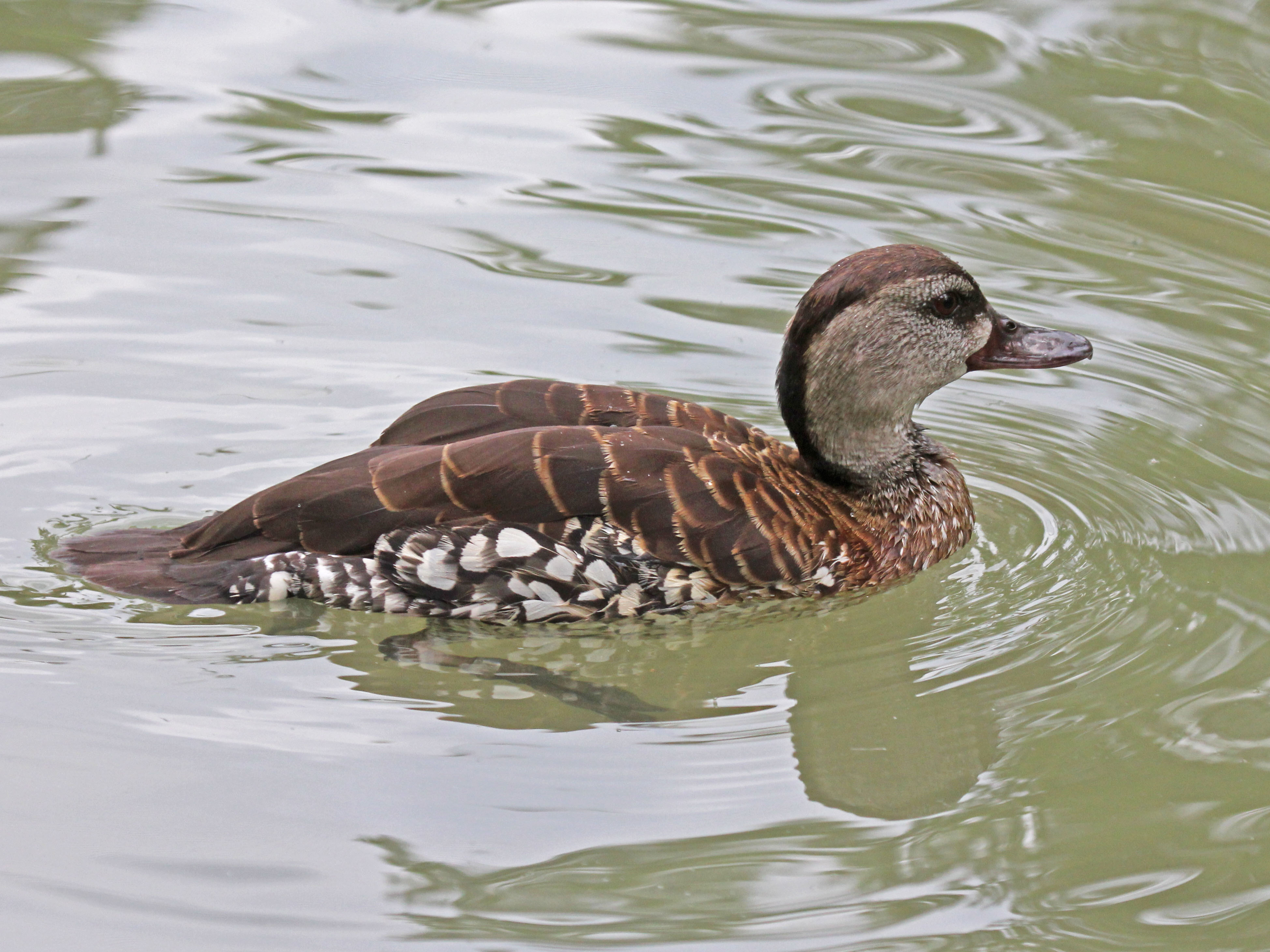

Conservation status
- Least Concern (IUCN 3.1)

Scientific classification
- Kingdom: Animalia
- Phylum: Chordata
- Class: Aves
- Order: Anseriformes
- Family: Anatidae
- Genus: Dendrocygna
- Species: D. guttata

Binomial name
- Dendrocygna guttata Schlegel, 1866
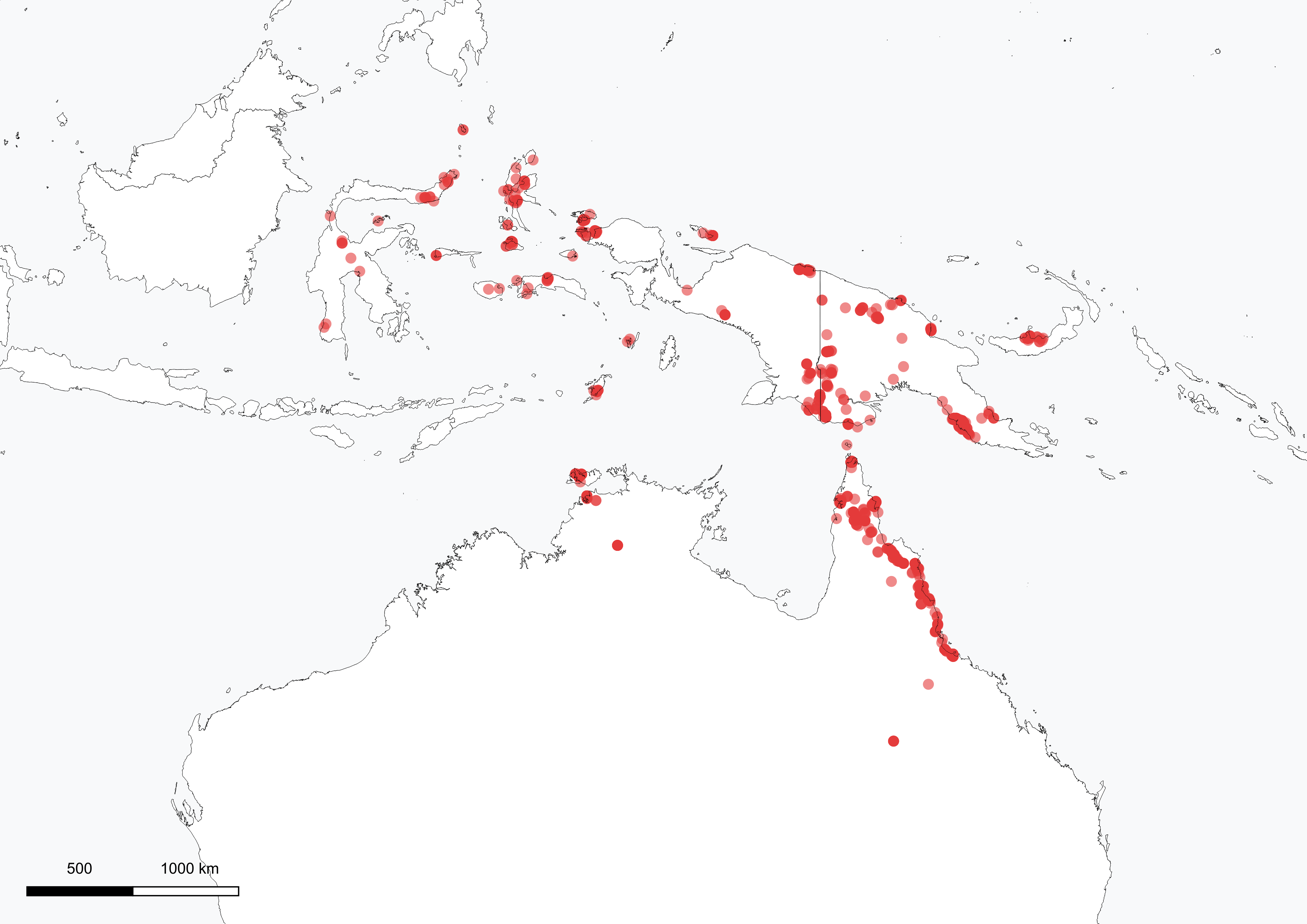
- Species distribution

= Spotted whistling duck =

Species of waterfowl

The spotted whistling duck (Dendrocygna guttata) is a member of the duck family Anatidae. It is also referred to as the "spotted tree duck". This duck can be found in Indonesia, New Guinea, Australia and the Philippines. Spotted ducks are also held in captive populations.

== Description ==
The Spotted whistling duck is one of the smaller species in the genus Dendrocygna. This duck grows to 43–50 cm tall. Males can weigh anywhere from 590g to 650g while females weigh 610g to 860g. White spots on their flanks and breasts gave these ducks the spotted name. The sides of the neck, faces, and eyebrows are all grey. Black or dark brown coloring stretches from the crown nape to the hindneck. This dark coloring is also found in the eyepatch. Their coloring resembles a cape with a thick collar. This cape starts as a light brown then fades into a darker brown closer to the tail. Their underbelly is mostly brown, sometimes spotted, and significantly lighter than the wings and the "collar." A white bar on the upper tail coverts can be seen during flight aiding in identification. They have dull pink legs with black webbed feet and sharp nails. The bill is dark, yet often seen with portions of red and a small white mark on the lower mandible. Spotted whistling ducks look as though they are raised from the ground, as though they are standing up tall. (look more into this). Their wings pressed strongly against the body. Inner vanes of the outer primaries are jagged and can be seen in flight (check on this). While flying, the head is positioned down causing the whole bird to look hunched. The tail stays pointed and looks long when in flight. Juveniles are seen with white streaks on flanks instead of spots and have significantly duller coloring. Spotted whistling ducks are visually similar to D. arborea, yet many scientists believe its closest relative is D. eytoni. After gaining their adult plumage at the age of 6 months,. the spotted whistling duck has a single annual molt. Like other ducks, swans, and geese, the spotted whistling duck molts synchronously. Synchronous molting is common within Anseriformes because waterfowl have the ability to avoid terrestrial predators. Unlike other birds, waterfowl float in ponds and lakes while they molt, safe from predators. Other more evolved ducks have two molts, whistling ducks only molt once.

== Taxonomy and Systematics ==
The spotted whistling duck, Dendrocygna guttata, was first reported in 1866. Like all other birds, it is an animal in the phylum Chordata and the class Aves. The spotted whistling duck is a part of the order Anseriformes, which includes all waterfowl. Swans, geese, and ducks are all a part of the family Anatidae. Within Anatidae, the family Dendrocygna encompasses all whistling ducks. Bird phylogenies are difficult to determine due to massive adaptive radiations throughout history. Scientists change phylogenetic trees often as new genetic information becomes available. In Australia philogonies are especially difficult, due to visually similar endemic and monotypic genera. Before genetic information was available, the Dendrocygna was classified within Anserinae by Delacour and Mayr. Within Anserinae, the Dendrocygna and Thalassornis were combined into one by Monrow in 1990 using DNA-DNA hybridization data. This genus then stayed consistent. Using mitochondrial DNA in 1996 Swaml et al. discovered Dendrocyna diverged first following Anseranatidae. This genus is the most basal group after the magpie goose. Whistling ducks are more closely related to swans and geese than the "true ducks" such as mallards. Then, in 2002 a study using sequenced DNA from the complete mitochondrial control region supported the 1996 conclusion. Within Denrocygna, the Spotted Whistling Duck was the most recent species discovery. In 1995 Livezey partitioned clades within the Dendrocygna, one clade including the Fulvous Whistling-Duck, Lesser whistling, D. arcuata and D. eytoni. D. arcuata and D. javanica are sister species. Outside this clade, the spotted whistling duck and the West Indian whistling duck are sister species.

== Distribution ==
Whistling ducks are found all over the world. The spotted whistling duck is distributed throughout the Philippines, Australia, and New Guinea. These ducks live in the southern part of the Philippines and several islands of Indonesia. In Indonesia spotted whistling ducks stretch from the Eastern Lesser Sundas islands to new guinea. Spotted whistling ducks are also found in Weipa and Iron ranges of Australia, but have also been seen at Wonga Beach. Scientists hypothesize the Indonesian population was introduced due to a storm blowing the birds off course.

== Habitat ==
Spotted whistling ducks live around bodies of water, like many other ducks. These ducks specifically live around small ponds and marshes surrounded by trees. They prefer humid and low altitude habitats. Spotted whistling ducks build hollows within the trees surrounding their habitats.

== Diet and Feeding ==
The Diet of the spotted whistling duck contains grass seeds, aquatic invertebrates, aquatic plants, and small fish. These ducks obtain their food by dabbling and diving. The ducks dabble at the surface of the ponds, filtering the water through their bills. The birds bounce on the surface to enter the water headfirst, after being underwater for a maximum of 15 seconds they emerge with another bounce. Scientists never observed food in the bill after the diving behavior. They concluded the birds consume the food while underwater. (Beruldsen) The majority of feeding occurs at night.

== Breeding ==
The genus Dendrocygna has strong pair bonds. Male and female birds are visually similar, females are slightly heavier than males. Without weighing the bird sex is difficult to determine. Breeding season begins in September with active nests found as late as April. Their nests are found in hollowed-out trees. Both parents participate in nest building at the same time. One pair can have several clutches a year consisting of 10-11 eggs. Eggs of this species measure 5.2 cm × 3.8 cm (2.0 in × 1.5 in) in length and width. Both parents incubate the eggs for 18–31 days and when hatched the chick weighs 17.5g. In captivity, the chicks fledged at 7 weeks, yet in the wild scientists have observed chicks flying at 45–50 days old. The spotted whistling duck has a breeding system described as 'primitive,' which is consistent with other basal groups in Anseriformes.

== Behavior ==
Spotted whistling ducks are found in groups with their own species and often with D. arcata. Compared to others in the genus, these ducks are less vocal. These birds perch on tree branches in groups slightly smaller than flocks. The flocks are often a mix of adults and juveniles. The adults shepherd the juveniles, keeping them close to the group. In 2000, Beruldsen observed a group consisting of 6 juveniles and two adults, male and female. The juveniles seemed unbothered by the human presence, but the adults made sure there was distance between Beruldsen and the juveniles. The birds kept their distance but seemed to be unaffected. The adult male positioned himself between the juveniles and the humans, protecting the other birds. This behavior was often accompanied by several high-pitched ticking calls.

== Threats ==
The spotted whistling duck is listed as least concern. Their population is stable with populations ranging from 10,000 to 25,000 birds. In captivity they were found to be specifically susceptible to avian tuberculous. Twenty-seven percent of bird species get avian tuberculosis and the disease is usually fatal. Spotted whistling ducks die at a higher rate than other birds. Within one collection of captive birds, the death rate of avian tuberculous reached 70% with the majority of deaths occurring from January to March. The relatively small size of this bird could explain the increased death rate.

== Interactions with Humans ==
The spotted whistling duck is not hunted often. These ducks are found in captivity, like many other duck species.

== Gallery ==
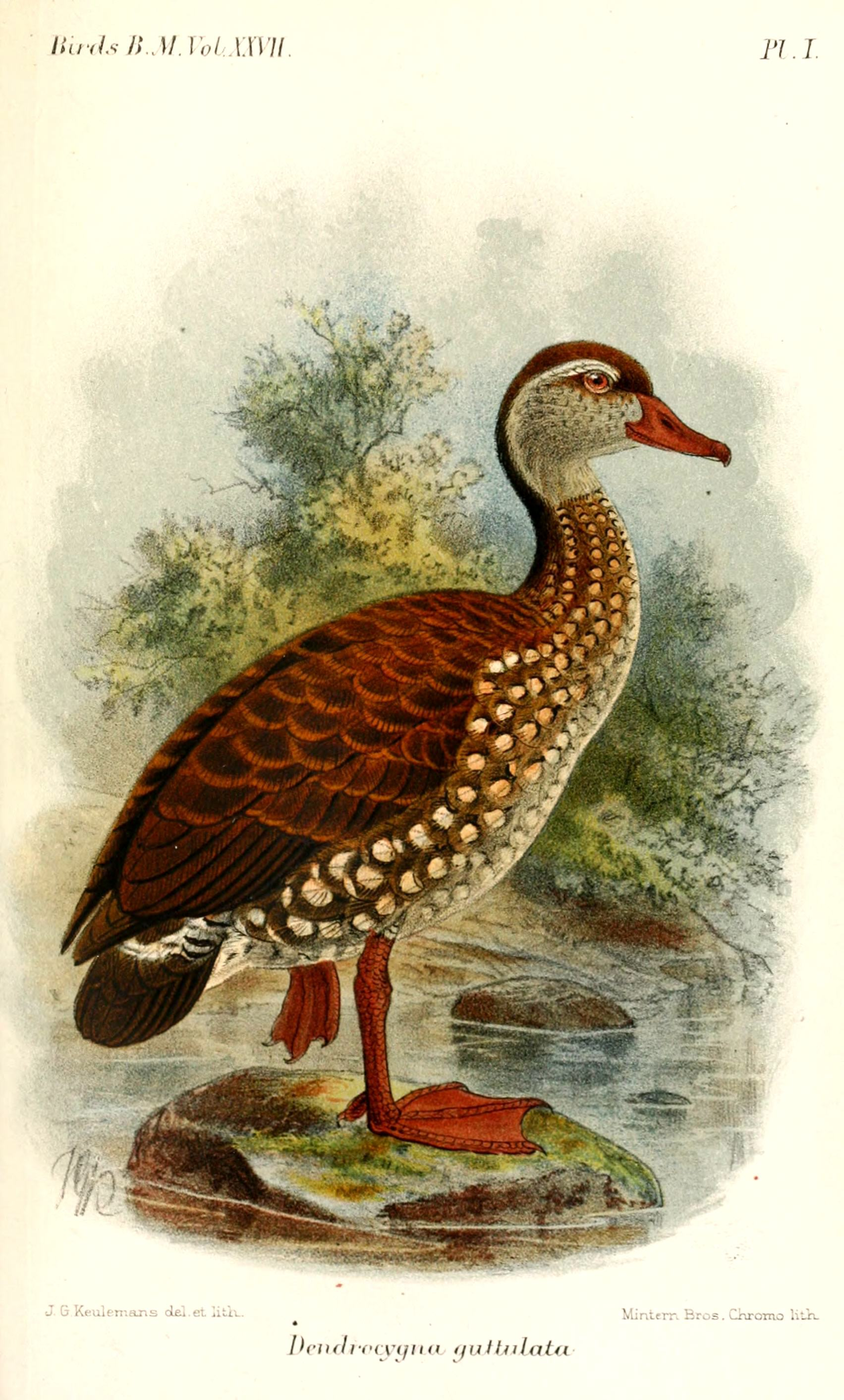

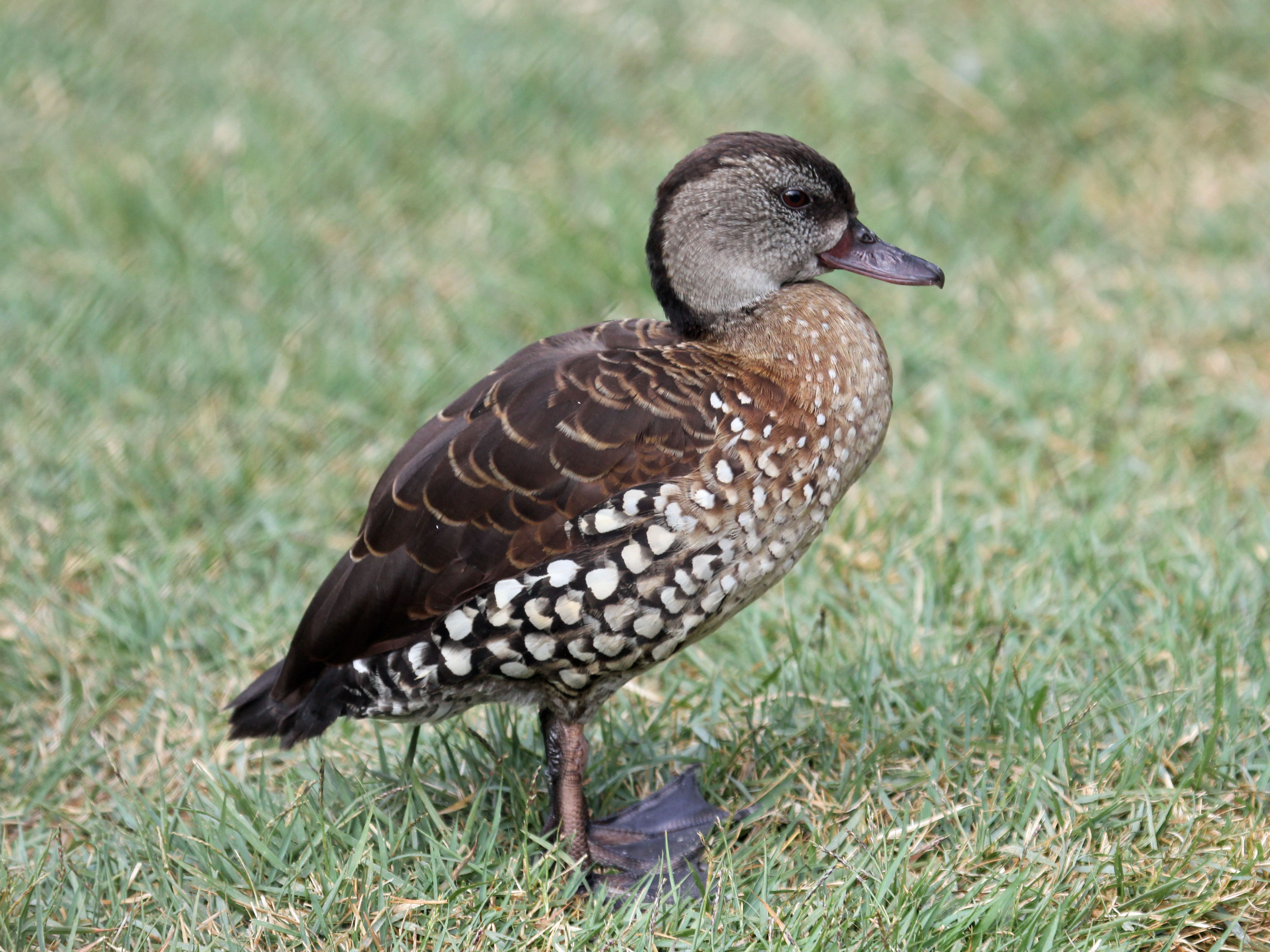

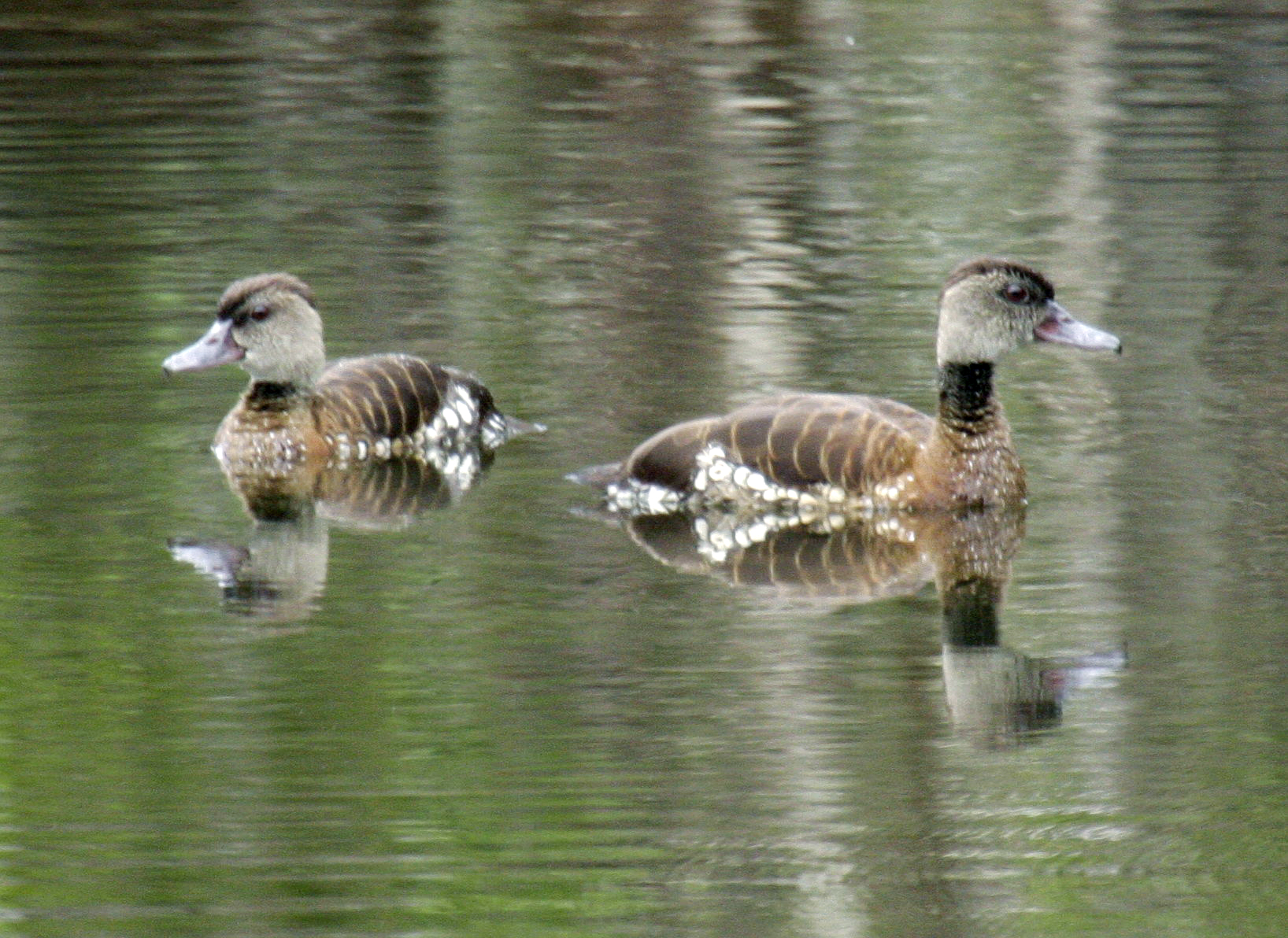

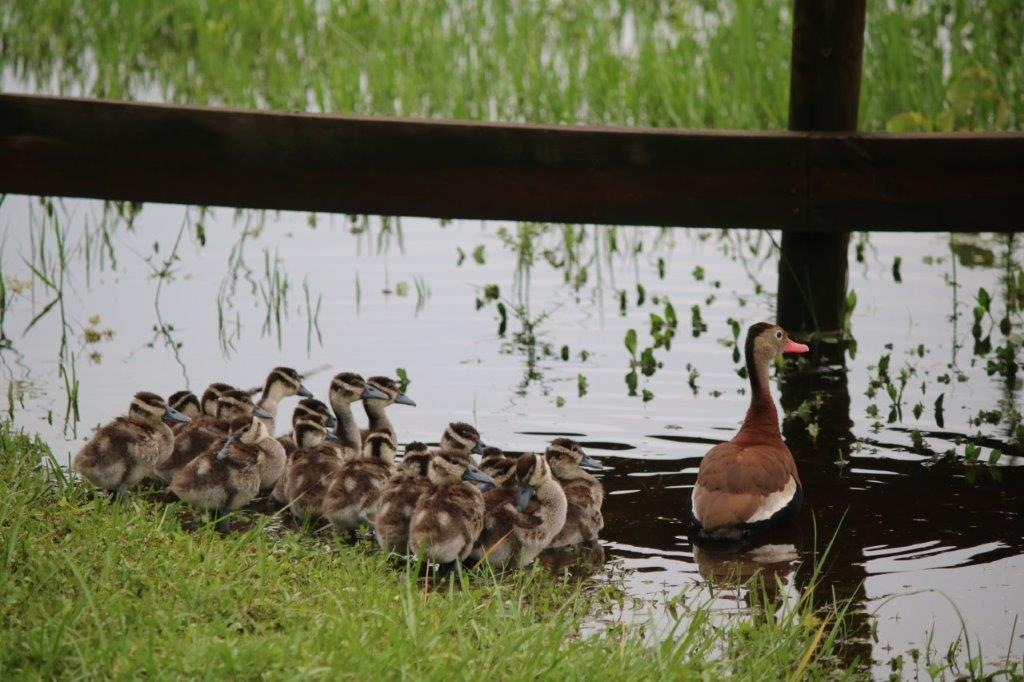

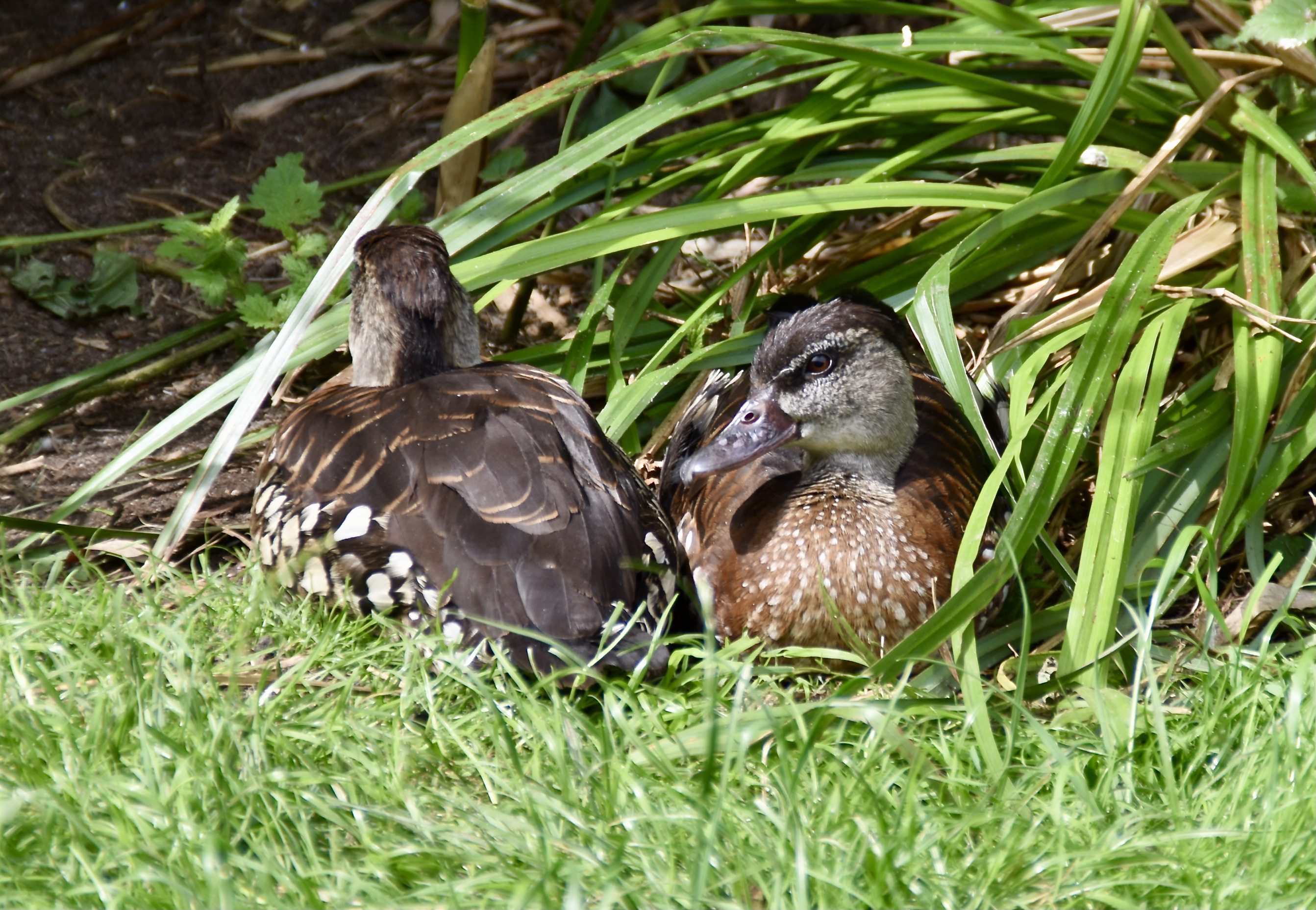

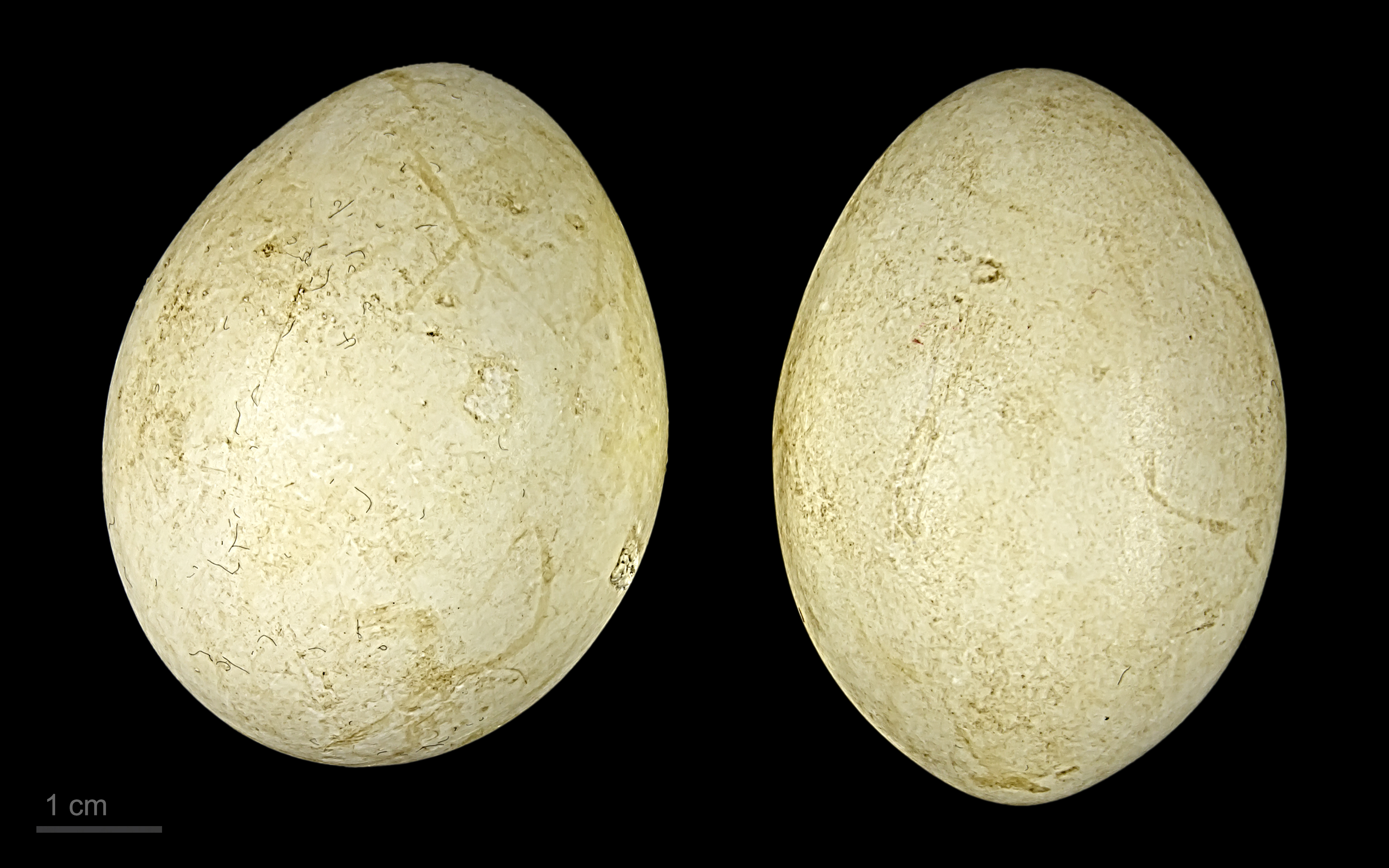
Dendrocygna guttata - MHNT
