= South Chennai =

Division of the Chennai city

South Chennai is a term used to the refer to the neighbourhoods of Chennai city that are situated to the south of the Adyar River. While historically used to refer to all localities to the south of the Coovum River as opposed to North Chennai that was situated to the north of the Coovum, the meaning of the term has changed over the years.

South Chennai now includes the TIDEL Park, SIPCOT IT Park and the stretch of Rajiv Gandhi Salai and East Coast Road that are known for their IT infrastructure, beach and health resorts and also the traditional neighbourhoods of Nanganallur, Alandur and Adambakkam and areas that now form part of Tambaram Municipal Corporation. With the exception of Guindy, Adyar and Thiruvanmiyur, the greater part of South Chennai was included within the municipal corporation limits only in 2011. The neighbourhoods of South Chennai have a higher standard of living than North Chennai though they still lag behind Central Chennai in some respects.

The South Chennai zone, with its head office at Guindy division comprises Guindy, Mylapore, Velachery, Alandur and Sholinganallur taluks.
