= Adambakkam railway station =

Railway station in India

Adambakkam
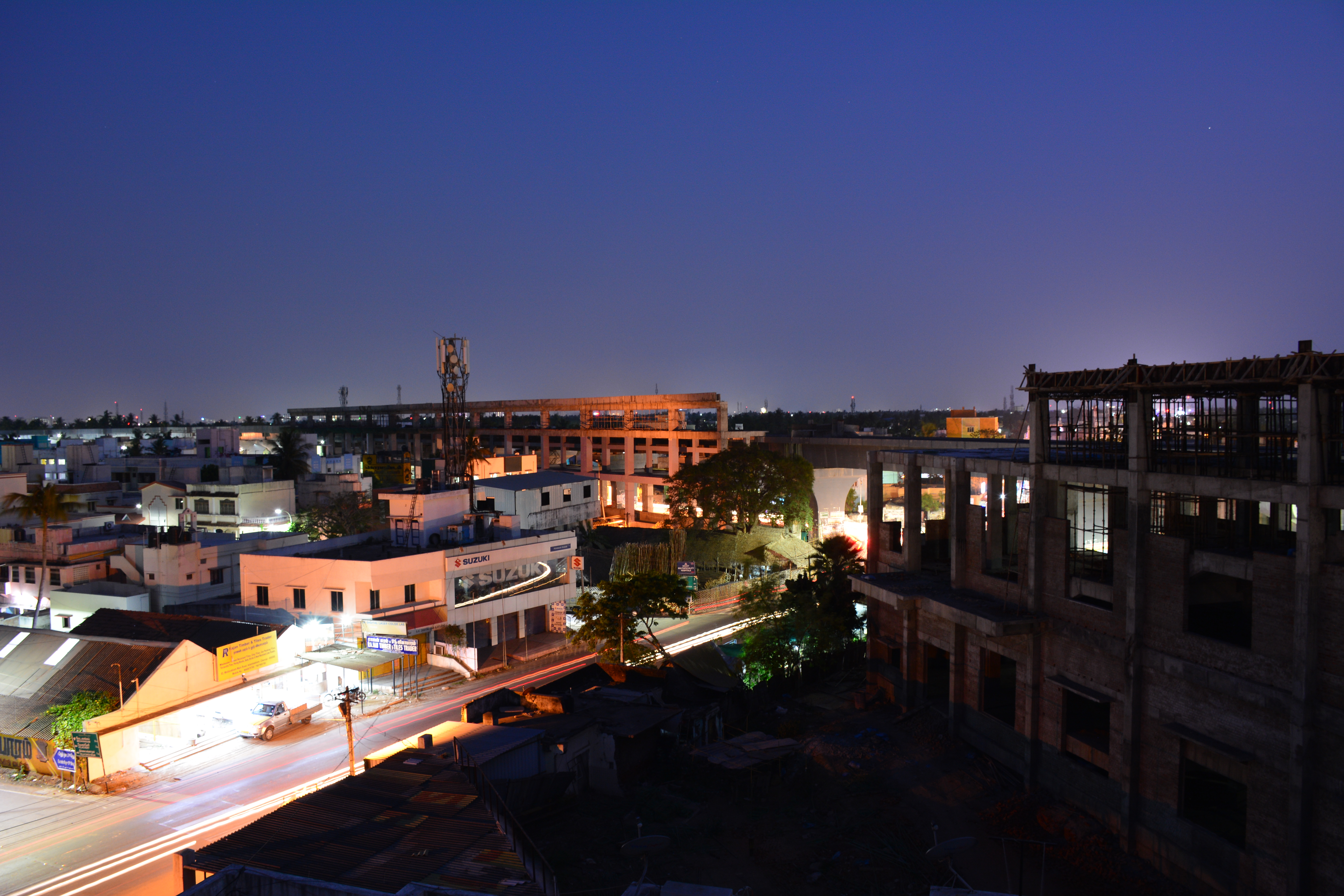
- Adambakkam station under construction

General information
- Coordinates: 12°58′57″N 80°11′49″E
- System: Chennai MRTS
- Platforms: Side platform Platform-1 → St. Thomas Mount; Platform-2 → Chennai Beach
- Tracks: 2
- Connections: Red Line Adambakkam metro station

Construction
- Structure type: Elevated

Other information
- Station code: ABKM

Services
Preceding station	Chennai MRTS	Following station
Puzhuthivakkam towards Chennai Beach	Line 1	St. Thomas Mount Terminus
Location

Adambakkam is an under-construction elevated railway station of Chennai MRTS. The station exclusively serves the neighbourhoods of Adambakkam, Nanganallur and Madipakkam.

== History ==
As part of the second phase extension of the Chennai MRTS network from Velachery to St. Thomas Mount, Adambakkam station was expected to be opened in 2013, but construction faced multiple delays due to land acquisition issues and legal hurdles. With the court dismissing all the cases against land acquisition for construction, the station was expected to be completed by the end of 2024, but multiple deadlines were revised. With the commissioning of Velachery - St. Thomas Mount stretch of MRTS on 14 March 2026, Adambakkam station was set to open but got delayed. The stoppage at the station is currently skipped for operational reasons. The main issue behind this has been the fact that there had been safety concerns regarding the gap between the train and the platform, which were yet to be resolved by the RDSO.

== Structure ==
=== Station layout ===
G	Street level	Exit/Entrance
L1	Mezzanine	Fare control, Station ticket counters and Automatic ticket vending machines
L2	Side platform | Doors will open on the left
L2	Platform 2 Eastbound	Towards → Chennai Beach; Next Station: Puzhuthivakkam
L2	Platform 1 Westbound	Towards ← St. Thomas Mount; Next Station: St. Thomas Mount
L2	Side platform | Doors will open on the left
L2

== Service and connections ==
Adambakkam station will be the 20th station on the MRTS line to St. Thomas Mount. In the return direction from St. Thomas Mount, it will be the second station towards Chennai Beach station. This station will be connected to Adambakkam metro station on Red line corridor of Chennai Metro, which is under construction.

== Station access through road ==
This MRTS station is being constructed at the western end of the southern arm of the Inner Ring Road (IRR).
Major road access to this station are from

- Mount-Medavakkam main road
- Inner Ring Road

== See also ==
- Chennai MRTS
- Chennai suburban railway
- Chennai Metro
- Transport in Chennai
