= Puzhuthivakkam railway station =

Chennai MRTS station

Puzhuthivakkam
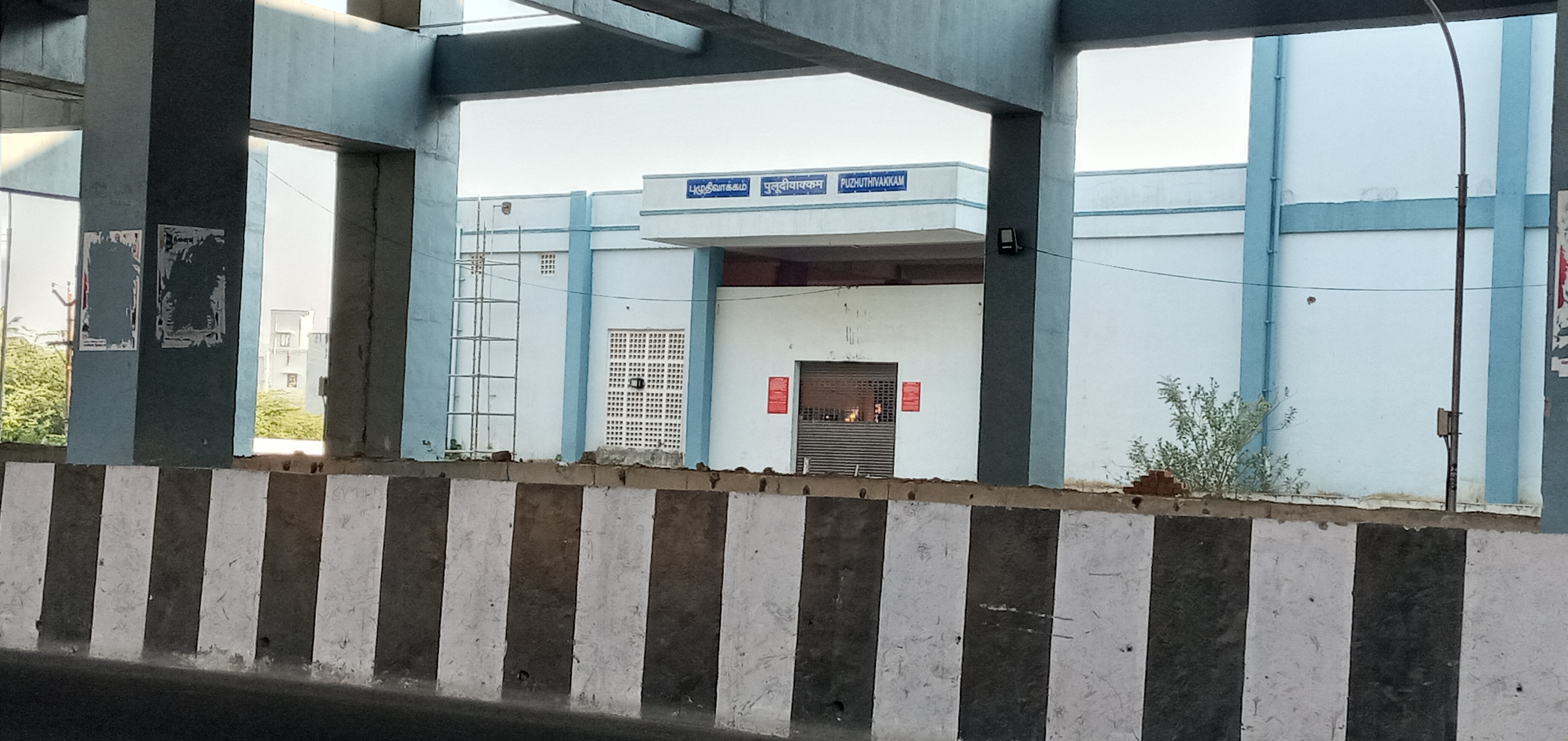
- Puzhuthivakkam Railway Station Entrance

General information
- Coordinates: 12°58′39″N 80°12′16″E
- System: Chennai MRTS
- Platforms: Side platform Platform-1 → St. Thomas Mount; Platform-2 → Chennai Beach
- Tracks: 2

Construction
- Structure type: Elevated

Other information
- Station code: PZV

History
- Opened: 14 March 2026; 6 months ago

Services
Preceding station	Chennai MRTS	Following station
Velachery towards Chennai Beach	Line 1	Adambakkam towards St. Thomas Mount
Location

Puzhuthivakkam railway station is an elevated station on the Chennai MRTS in Chennai, India. The station exclusively serves the Chennai MRTS and serves the neighbourhood of Velachery and Puzhuthivakkam.

== History ==
Puzhuthivakkam station was expected to be opened in 2013, as part of the second phase extension of the Chennai MRTS network, from Velachery to St. Thomas Mount but construction faced multiple delays due to land acquisition issues. With the court dismissing all the cases against land acquisition for construction, the station was expected to be completed by the end of 2024, but multiple deadlines were revised. The station opened on 14 March 2026, with the commissioning of last leg of MRTS stretch from Velachery to St. Thomas Mount.

== Structure ==
=== Station layout ===
G	Street level	Exit/Entrance
L1	Mezzanine	Fare control, Station ticket counters and Automatic ticket vending machines
L2	Side platform | Doors will open on the left
L2	Platform 2 Eastbound	Towards → Chennai Beach; Next Station: Velachery
L2	Platform 1 Westbound	Towards ← St. Thomas Mount; Next Station: Adambakkam
L2	Side platform | Doors will open on the left
L2

== Service and connections ==
Puzhuthivakkam station will be the 19th station on the MRTS line to St. Thomas Mount. In the return direction from St. Thomas Mount, it will be the third station towards Chennai Beach station.

The station also connects to Chennai Metropolitan Transport Corporation buses that ply on the Inner Ring Road heading East (towards Velacheri) and West (towards Medavakkam main road and Grand Southern Trunk road). Some prominent connecting routes include:

Route	Route information	via
M14	Eastbound to Medavakkam Koot Road	St. Thomas Mount, Vanuvampet, Kilkattalai, Kovilambakkam, Vellaikal
18D	Westbound to Broadway/Royapuram and Eastbound to Kilkattalai	M.G.R Central, P.OR.R Sons, L.I.C, D.M.S, Teynampet, Nandanam, Saidapet, Little Mount, Guindy, N.G.O Colony, St. Thomas Mount, Vanuvampet
18P	Northbound to Broadway/Royapuram and Southbound to Kilkattalai	M.G.R Central, P.OR.R Sons, L.I.C, D.M.S, Teynampet, Nandanam, Saidapet, Little Mount, Guindy, N.G.O Colony, Adambakkam, Puzhuthivakkam, Vanuvampet
76	Westbound to Koyambedu and Westbound to Medavakkam	Arumbakkam Metro, Vadapalani, Ashok Pillar, Ekkattuthangal, Alandur Metro, Vanuvampet, Kilkattalai, Kovilambakkam, Vellaikal
76B	Westbound to Koyambedu and Westbound to Ottiyambakkam	Arumbakkam Metro, Vadapalani, Ashok Pillar, Ekkattuthangal, Alandur Metro, Vanuvampet, Kilkattalai, Kovilambakkam, Vellaikal, Medavakkam, Chithalakappam
51R and M51R	Northbound to Royapuram and Southbound to Puzhuthivakkam bus terminus	Royapuram B.S., Parrys Corner, M.G.R Central, P.OR.R Sons, T.V.S, D.M.S, Teynampet, Saidapet, Concorde, Guindy Race Course, A.G.S Colony, Kakkan Nagar (Bridge), Brindavan Colony, Puzhuthivakkam B.S.
S83	Northbound to Alandur Metro and Eastbound to Gurunanak College	St Thomas Mount, Adambakkam, Puzhuthivakkam M.R.T.S, Velachery M.R.T.S, Velachery Vijayanagar

== See also ==
- Chennai MRTS
- Chennai suburban railway
- Chennai Metro
- Transport in Chennai
