= Adambakkam =

Neighborhood of Chennai, India

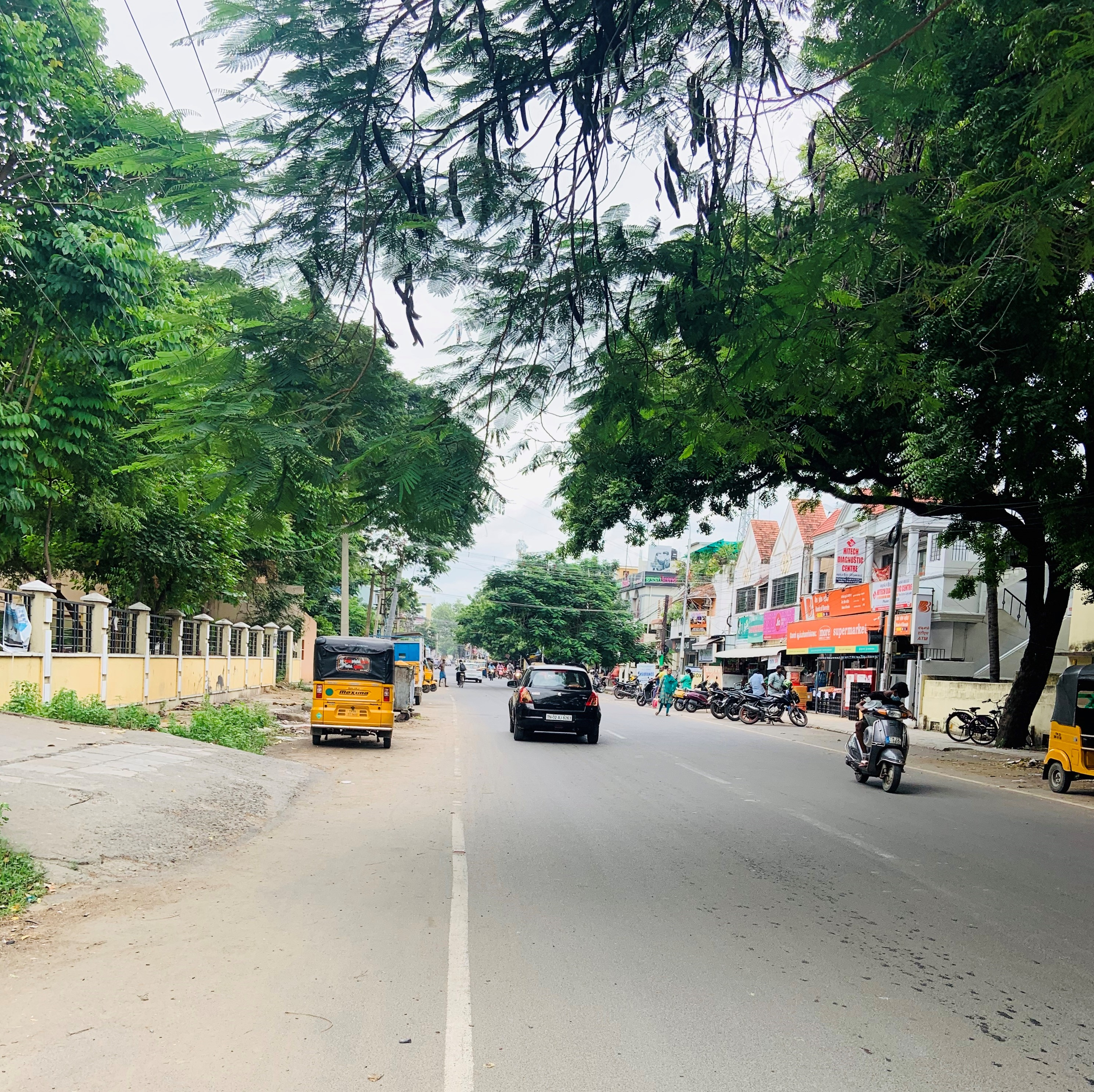
- City Link Road, Adambakkam

- Location within Chennai Location within Tamil Nadu Location within India
- Coordinates: 12.99°N 80.20°E
- Country: India
- State: Tamil Nadu
- Metro: Chennai
- Ward: 163,165
- District: Chennai district

Government
  - Body: CMDA
- Elevation: 7 m (23 ft)

Languages
  - Official: Tamil
- Time zone: UTC+5:30 (IST)
- PIN: 600088
- Telephone code: 44 - 225, 233, 234
- Vehicle registration: TN-22
- Lok Sabha constituency: Sriperumbathur
- Legislative Assembly constituency: Alandur
- Planning agency: CMDA

Adambakkam is a neighbourhood of Chennai, India. It is primarily a residential locality situated in South Chennai. Adambakkam area comes under Velachery taluk and Alandur taluk, Chennai District of Chennai Corporation. Adambakkam is surrounded by areas namely, Alandur in the North-West, Nanganallur in the West, Madipakkam in the South, Velachery in the East and Guindy in the North. Earlier, one part of Adambakkam was under the direct governance of Chennai Corporation. From October 2011, the entire area was merged with the Chennai Corporation. Upon completion of the MRTS extension line, the neighbourhood will be served by Adambakkam railway station.

== Geography ==
Adambakkam is located at 12.99°N 80.20°E. It has an average elevation of 7 metres (23 feet). The Adambakkam Lake situated in Jeevan Nagar and the Velachery Lake situated in Kakkan Nagar are the two lakes present in the locality.

== Culture ==
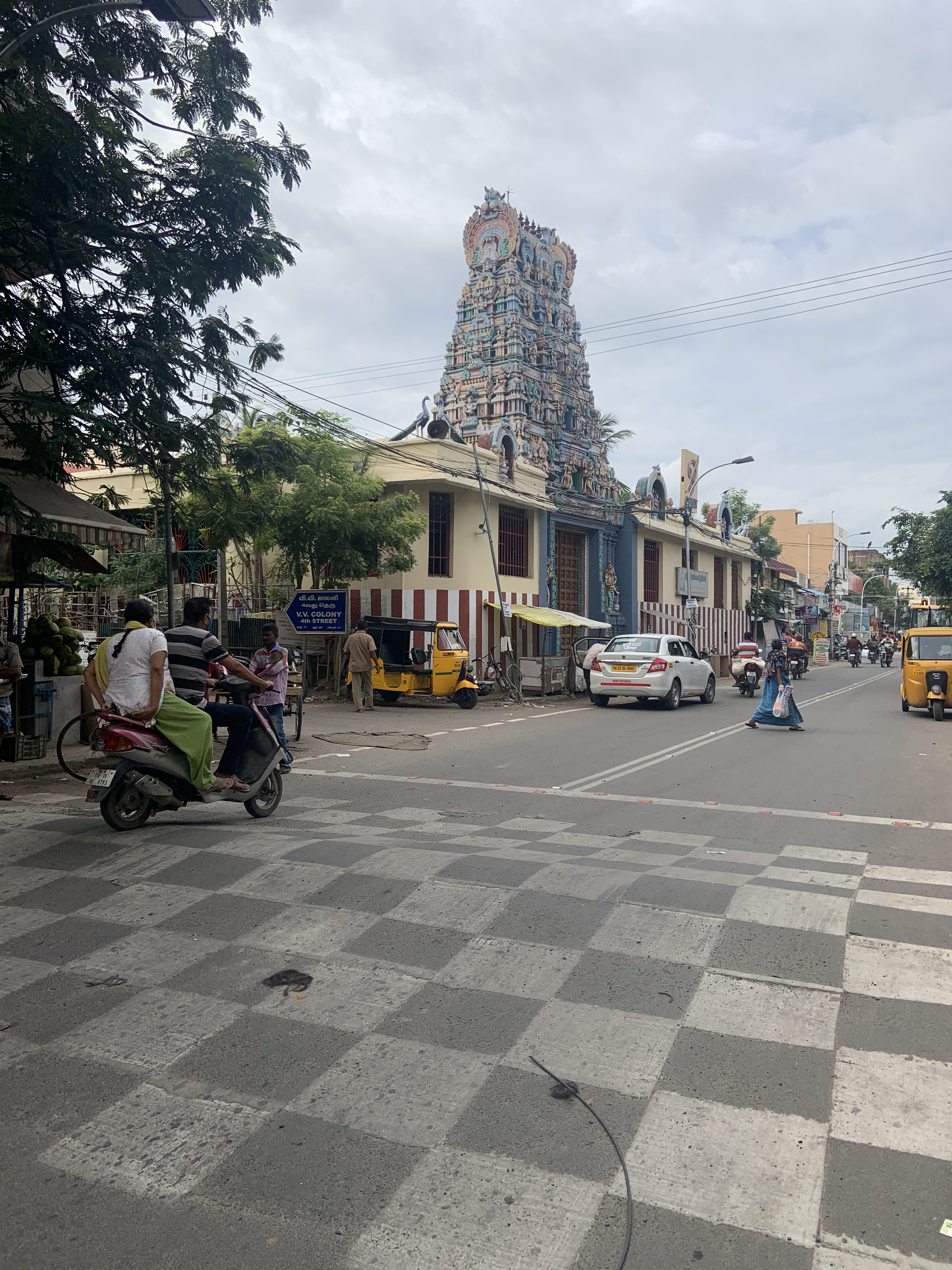
Sri Subramaniya Swamy Temple at Brindavan Nagar.

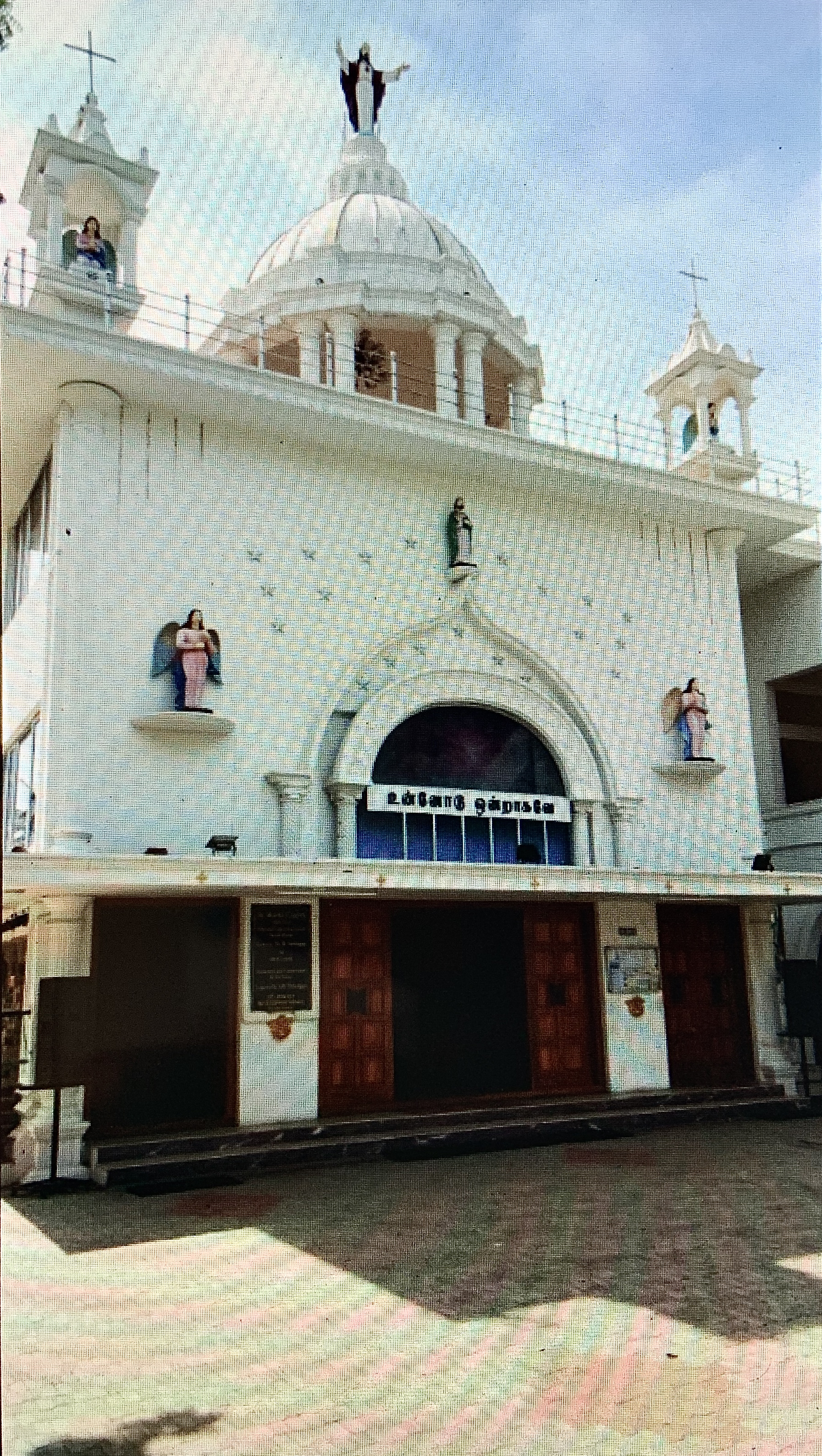
St Mark's Catholic Church is an important Catholic Church in Adambakkam.

Adambakkam has a population with diverse cultures and religions where Hindus, Muslims and Christians co-exist. Prominent Hindu temples are the famous Pazhandi Amman temple near St. Thomas Mount railway station, Sundara Vinayagar Temple in NGO colony, Devi Nagamuthu Mariamman temple in EB colony, Lord Subramanya temple in Brindavan Nagar, Bhuvaneshwari Amman temple in Andal Nagar and Nandeeswarar temple near St. Thomas Mount railway station. Viswaroopa Sarvamangala Shaneeswara Bhagawan Sannidhi is located inside Devi Nagamuthu Mariamman temple. Prominent Mosque is the Masthan Gori Masjid in Masthan Ghori street. Prominent Church is St. Mark's Catholic Church in Brindavan Nagar. Adhinath Digambar Jain Temple at Indira Gandhi street, Vanuvampetttai near Adambakkam is a Jain place of worship.

== Transport ==
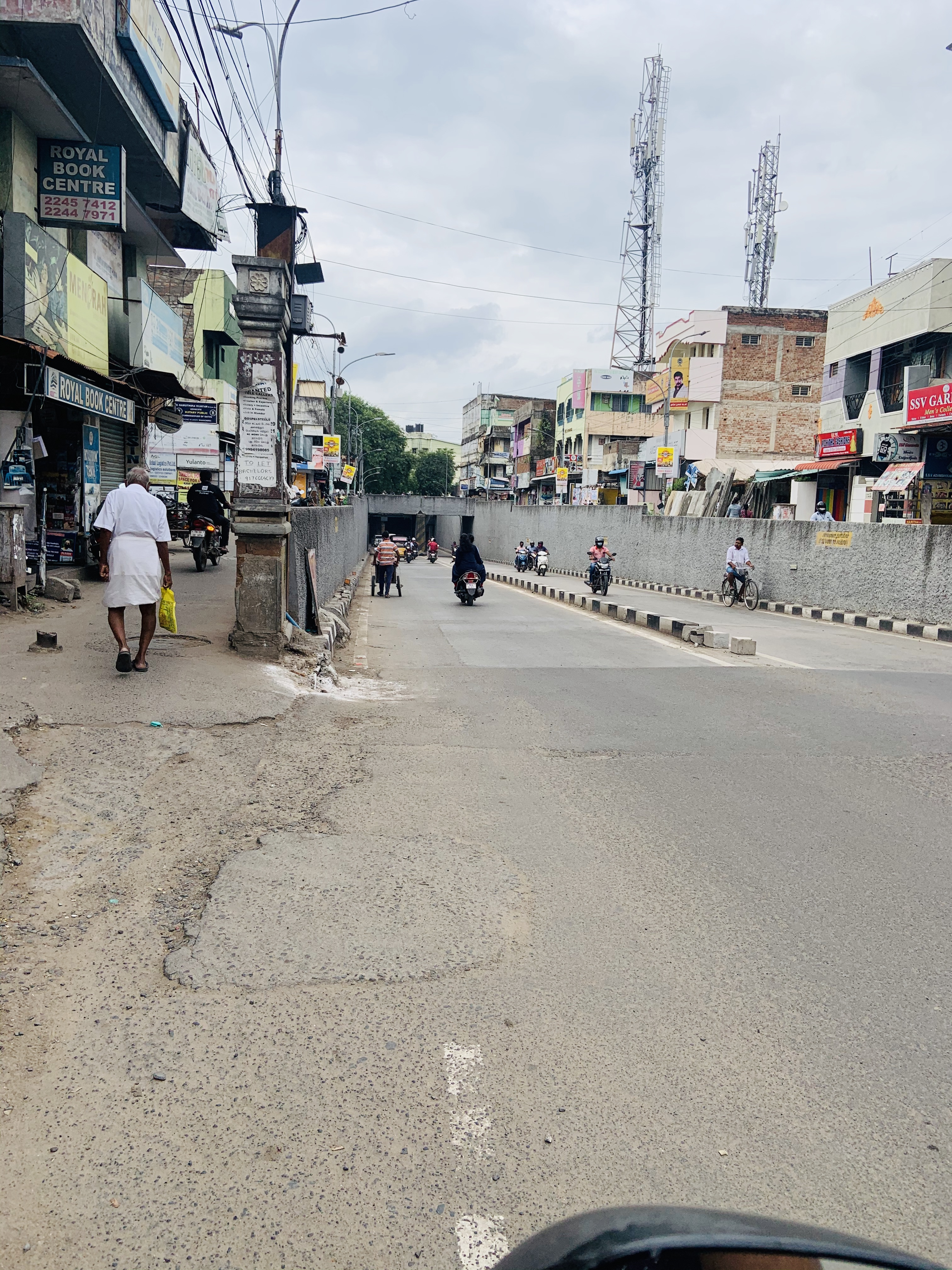
Karuneegar Street (Northern End), adjacent to the St. Thomas Mount Railway Station, is the business center of Adambakkam and connects Adambakkam to Alandur.

Adambakkam has a fully operational MTC bus terminus and depot located at NGO Colony on City Link Road. This depot is used by MTC to park, service, and refuel many of the buses that operate in the surrounding areas.

The St. Thomas Mount Railway Station between Alandur and Adambakkam, part of the Chennai suburban railway serves this area. Adambakkam station on the phase II extension of the elevated Mass Rapid Transit System (MRTS) directly connects Adambakkam with Chennai's IT corridor and the major city's eastern neighbourhoods such as Tiruvanmiyur, Adyar, Triplicane, Chepauk, and Mylapore. This station is located at Medavakkam main road junction near Vanuvampet (Madippakam). St. Thomas Mount subway (underpass) and Thillai Ganga Nagar subway (underpass) connects Adambakkam with the GST Road. The Kakkan Bridge connects Ramakrishnapuram and Brindavan Nagar. Another underpass exclusive for two wheeler traffic that connects the link road of Adambakkam and the Velachery road of Alandur is under construction.

Summary of Transport facilities in Adambakkam:

- MTC bus services via Medavakkam Main Road from all major areas to Nanganallur, Ullagaram (Madipakkam), Keelkattalai, Nanmangalam, Kovilambakkam and Medavakkam Koot Road.
- MTC bus services via Brindavan Nagar from all major areas to Puzhuthivakkam and AG's Colony.
- Beach-Tambaram-Chengalpattu Suburban train service.
- MRTS extension from Velachery to Puzhuthivakkam, Adambakkam and St. Thomas Mount (Under construction).
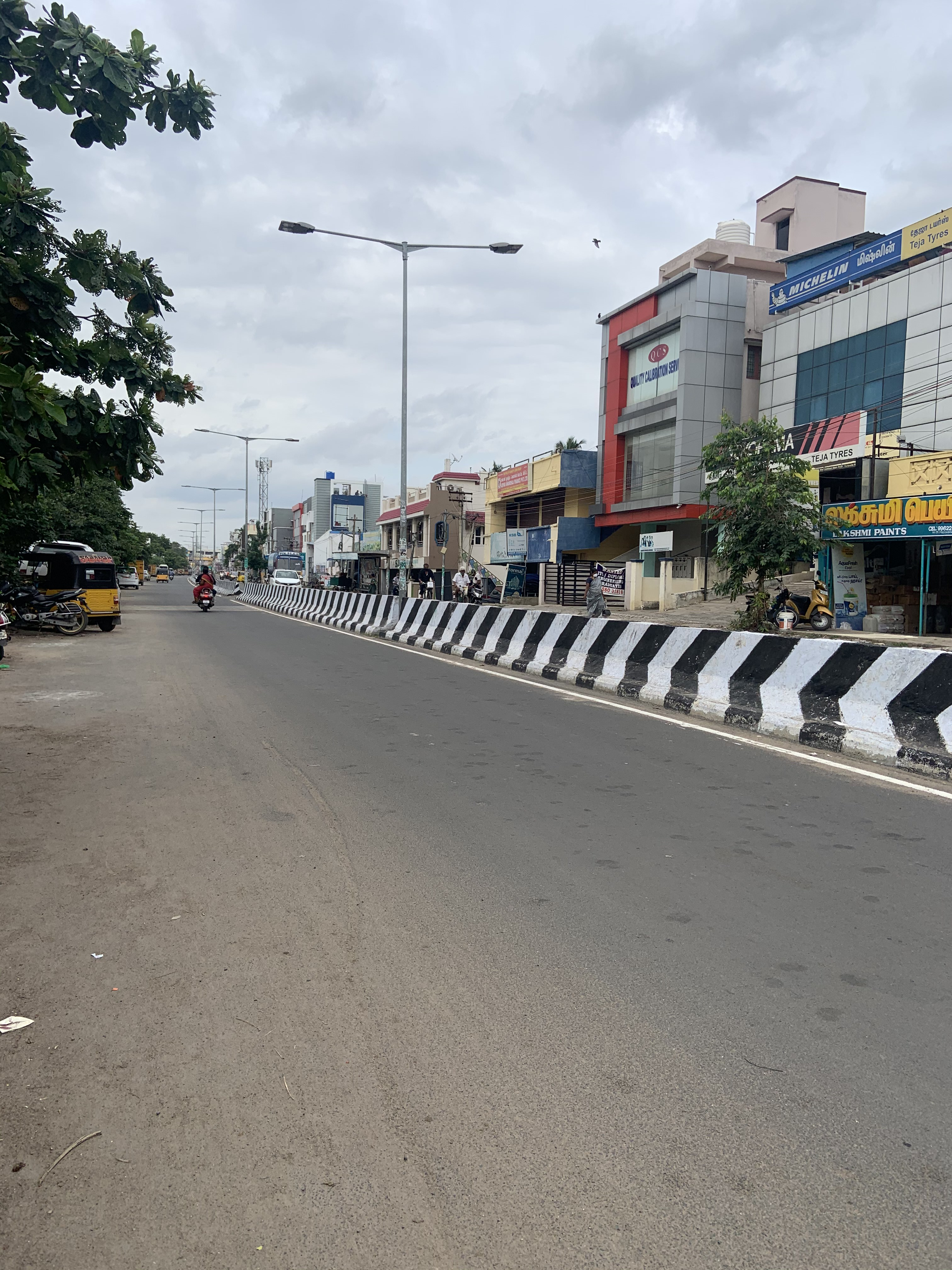
- Medavakkam Main Road Northern End lies in Adambakkam.
  Metro Rail from Central to St. Thomas Mount via Koyambedu (Green Line) running service via Alandur. Can also switch to Airport at Alandur (Blue Line).

Important Roads:

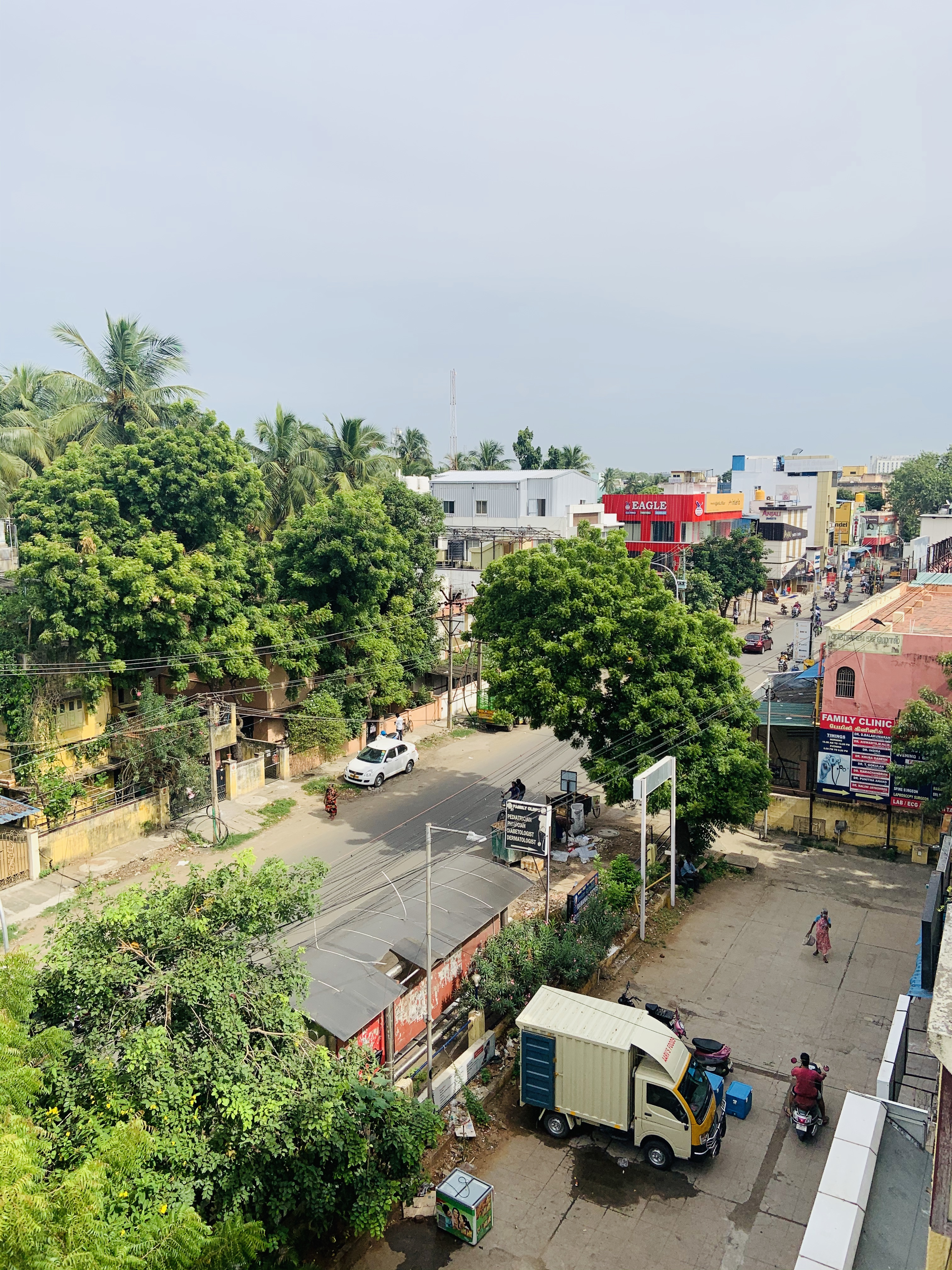
An Aerial View of the City Link Road. City Link Road is one of the most important roads in Adambakkam.

- City link Road (Link Road) - Connects Race view Colony (Guindy) and Brindavan Nagar.
- Brindavan/Sakthi/Mahalakshmi/Balaji Nagar Main Road - Connects Kakkan Nagar and Jawaharlal Nehru road (inner ring road).
- Medavakkam Main Road - Connects St Thomas Mount Railway Station and Jawaharlal Nehru road (inner ring road) and further towards Medavakkam via Madipakkam, Keelkatalai and Kovilambakkam.
- Thiruvalluvar Main Road - Connects St Thomas Mount Railway Station and Adambakkam Depot (N.G.O Colony Bus Terminus).
- Karuneegar Street - Connects Parthasarathy Nagar and GST road via Alandur.

The Jawaharlal Nehru road (inner ring road) that outlines Adambakkam in the southern side is becoming a hot spot for real estate and commercial establishments.

== Educational Institutions ==
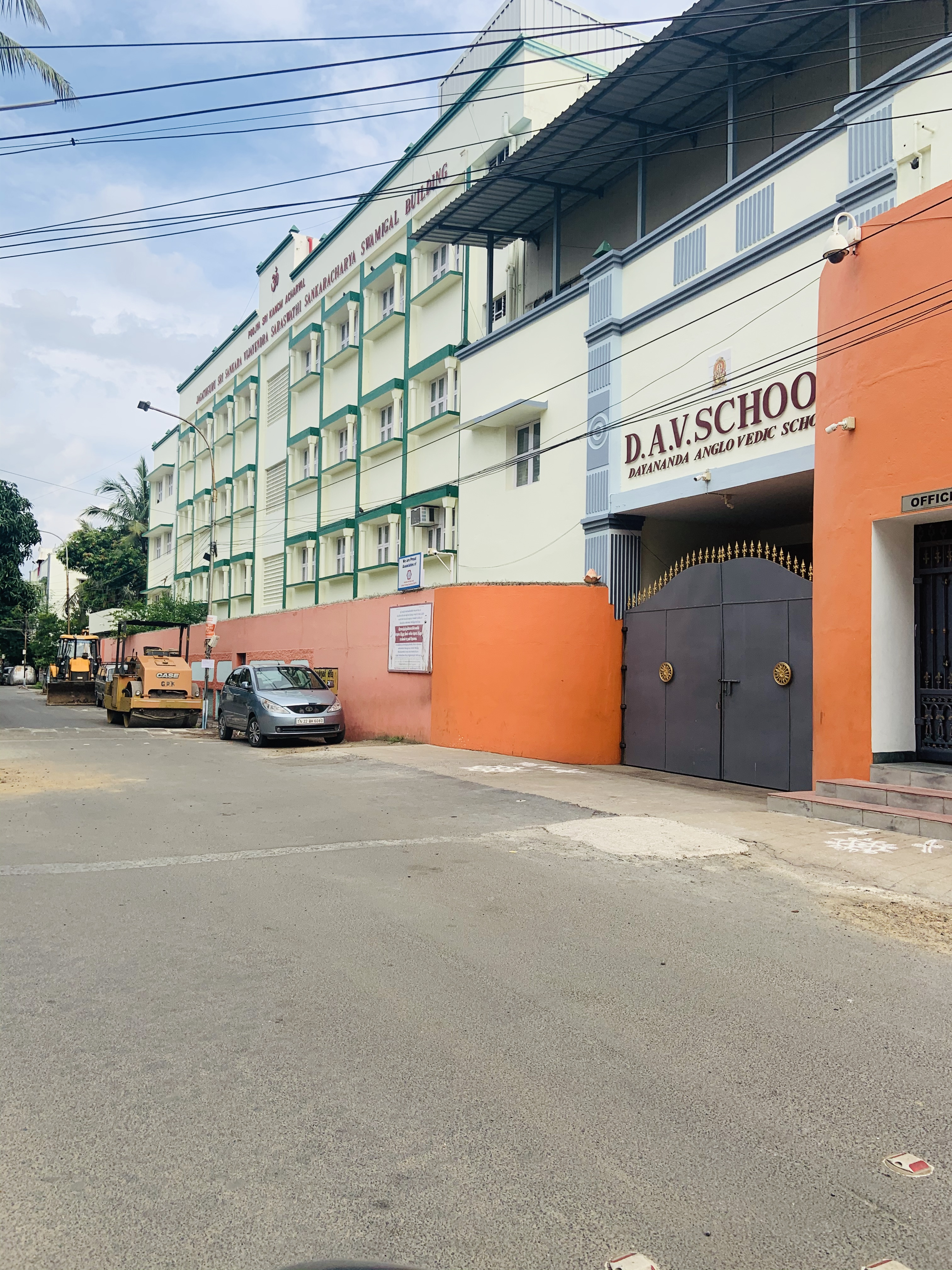
D.A.V School Adambakkam Branch

- New Prince Matriculation Higher Secondary School
- D.A.V School
- G.K Shetty Hindu Vidyalaya Matriculation Higher Secondary School
- GKS Hindu Vidyalaya
- St. Mark's High School
- Indira Gandhi Matriculation School
- Beta Matriculation Higher Secondary School
- Saint Britto's College
- Unity Matriculation School

== Hospitals ==
- G.R. Hospital and Fertility Centre
- Ponmalligai Multi Speciality Hospital
- SP Hospital
- Prime Care Hospital
- Mount Multispeciality Hospitals

== See also ==
- Nanganallur
- Puzhuthivakkam
- Alandur

== In the News ==
- Theatres
- Mini Bus Services
- Project Green Hands Nursery in EB Colony-Isha Foundation
- Shri Narendra Modi (Gujarat CM)-DAV School Function
