= Puzhuthivakkam =

Puzhuthivakkam Ullagaram Ullagaram–Puzhuthivakkam
- neighbourhood
- Location within Chennai
- Coordinates: 12.974094°N 80.202448°E
- Country: India
- State: Tamil Nadu
- District: Chennai
- Metro: Chennai
- Zone: Perungudi
- Ward: 168, 169

Population (2011)
  - Total: 53,322

Languages
  - Official: Tamil
- Time zone: UTC+5:30 (IST)
- PIN: 600091
- Vehicle registration: TN-22
- Legislative Constituency: Sholinganallur

Puzhuthivakkam (in Tamil: புழுதிவாக்கம்), commonly known as Ullagaram or Ullagaram–Puzhuthivakkam, is a southern neighbourhood of Chennai in Tamil Nadu, India. Puzhuthivakkam loosely translates to dust neighborhood. The neighbourhood is part of the Greater Chennai Corporation, following Chennai's expansion into Kanchipuram district. Puzhuthivakkam is located between the neighborhoods of Madipakkam, Adambakkam, Velachery, Pallikaranai, and Nanganallur. Puzhuthivakkam was initially developed in the late 1960s and early 1970s. The neighborhood is served by Puzhuthivakkam railway station and buses that ply on the Inner Ring Road. As of 2011, the town had a population of 53,322.

== Demographics ==
Religious census
Religion	Percent(%)
Hindu	90.6%
Muslim	2.38%
Christian	6.61%
Sikh	0.05%
Buddhist	0.02%
Jain	0.12%
Other	0.12%
No religion	0.1%

According to 2011 census, Puzhuthivakkam had a population of 53,322 with a sex-ratio of 992 females for every 1,000 males, much above the national average of 929. A total of 5,280 were under the age of six, constituting 2,679 males and 2,601 females. Scheduled Castes and Scheduled Tribes accounted for 5.39% and .21% of the population respectively. The average literacy of the town was 85.55%, compared to the national average of 72.99%. The town had a total of 13918 households. There were a total of 20,004 workers, comprising 39 cultivators, 67 main agricultural labourers, 246 in house hold industries, 18,599 other workers, 1,053 marginal workers, 26 marginal cultivators, 11 marginal agricultural labourers, 30 marginal workers in household industries and 986 other marginal workers. As per the religious census of 2011, Puzhithivakkam (Ullagaram) (M) had 90.6% Hindus, 2.38% Muslims, 6.61% Christians, 0.05% Sikhs, 0.02% Buddhists, 0.12% Jains, 0.12% following other religions and 0.1% following no religion or did not indicate any religious preference.

== Transport ==
Puzhuthivakkam has a bus stand. Nowadays buses ply directly from this bus stand to Koyambedu, High Court, Chennai Central Railway Station, Guduvanchery, Sriperumbudur, and other areas. The most popular bus service (run by the State Government of Tamil Nadu) i.e., "Small Bus" runs through this area.

== Places of worship ==
There are several places of worship in this locality. A few of them include:

- Sri Vijaya Ganapathy Temple (Ullagaram)
- Sankara Madam (Adambakkam)
- Sengazhani Amman Kovil (Puzhuthivakkam)
- Selva Ganapathy Temple Hindu Religious and Charitable Endowments Board (Ullagaram)
- Shri Vijaya Ganapathy Temple (Ullagaram)
- Shri Sita Rama Anjaneyar temple at Swamy Nagar (Ullagaram)
- Shri Badala Vigneshwara temple (Puzhuthivakkam)
- Shri Drowpathy Amman temple at Vanuvampet (Ullagaram)
- St. Judes Catholic Church at Vanuvampet
- CSI St. James Church (Ullagaram)
- Sri Ramar temple at Ram Nagar (Puzhuthivakkam)
- Moovarasampet Mosque
- Shri Bala Vinayagar Temple at Near Bus Stand
- Balamurugan Balaganapathy Temple at Jothiramalingam Street
- Sri Siddhi Vinayagar Temple, Vallal Adhiyamaan Street, Ramnagar North, (Puzuthivakkam)

== Shops and facilities ==
Puzhuthivakkam is now a bustling business entrepot as the number of shops and commercial establishments like departmental stores, bakery and confectionery are gradually increasing. A large number of pharmacies are present here catering the needs of many people.

== See also ==
- Chennai
