= Perungudi railway station =

Railway station in Tamil Nadu, India

Perungudi
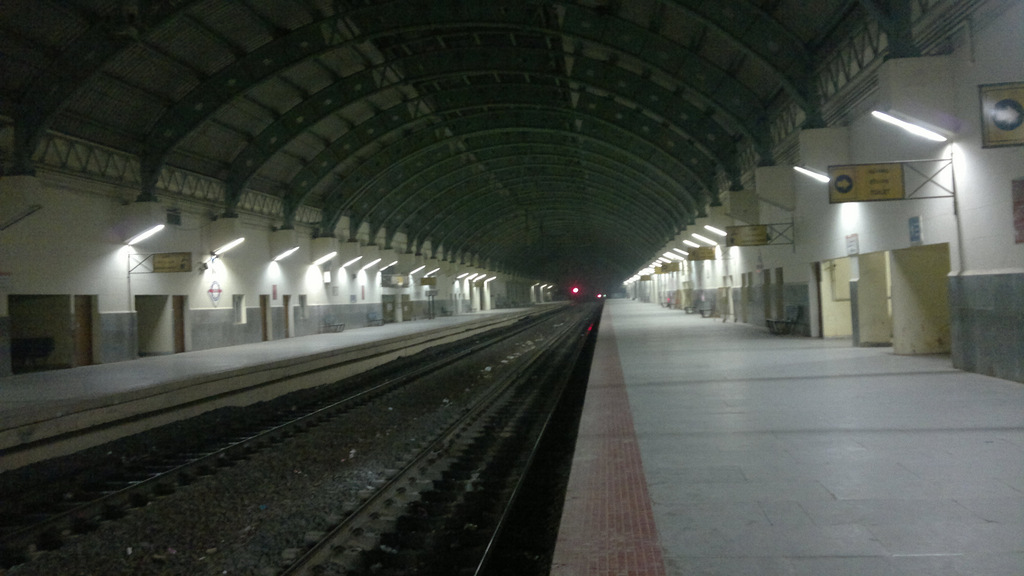
- Perungudi MRTS Station

General information
- Coordinates: 12°58′31″N 80°13′53″E
- System: Chennai MRTS
- Platforms: Side platform Platform-1 → St. Thomas Mount; Platform-2 → Chennai Beach
- Tracks: 2

Construction
- Structure type: At Grade

Other information
- Station code: PRGD

History
- Opened: 19 November 2007; 18 years ago

Services
Preceding station	Chennai MRTS	Following station
Taramani towards Chennai Beach	Line 1	Velachery towards St. Thomas Mount
Location

Perungudi is a railway station on the Chennai MRTS. It serves the neighbourhood of Perungudi, including localities such as Indira Nagar, Park Avenue and Tansi Nagar. It is located 1.3 km (0.81 mi) from the Perungudi Lake.

== History ==
Perungudi station was opened on 19 November 2007, as part of the second phase of the Chennai MRTS network.

== Structure ==
The length of the platform is 280 m (920 ft). The station premises includes 8,080 m^{2} (87,000 sq ft) of open parking area.

A two-wheeler parking lot was created at the station in 2011, where about 150 to 200 two-wheelers and bicycles are parked every day.

=== Station Layout ===
G	Street level & Mezzanine	Exit/Entrance, Fare control, Station agent, Token vending machines, Crossover
P	Side platform | Doors will open on the left
P	Platform 2 Eastbound	Towards → Chennai Beach; Next Station: Taramani
P	Platform 1 Westbound	Towards ← St. Thomas Mount; Next Station: Velachery
P	Side platform | Doors will open on the left
P

== Service and connections ==
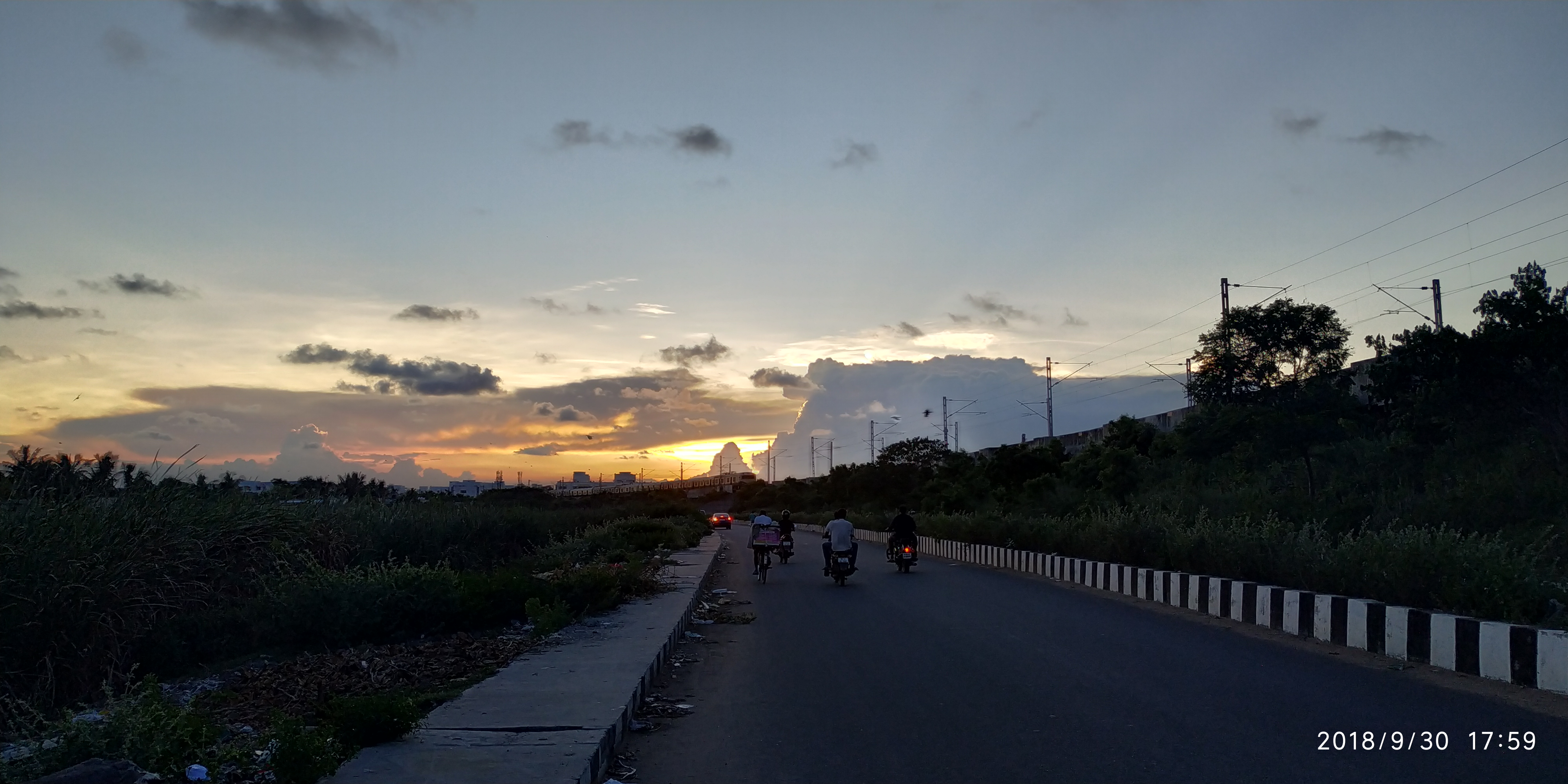
Road to Perungudi Railway station

Perungudi station is the sixteenth station on the MRTS line to St. Thomas Mount. In the return direction from St. Thomas Mount, it is currently the fifth station towards Chennai Beach station A 3.4 km-long (2.1 mi), 18 m-wide (59 ft) access road to Perungudi station and Taramani station is being constructed along the MRTS line from Velachery to Taramani.

== See also ==
- Chennai MRTS
- Chennai suburban railway
- Chennai Metro
- Transport in Chennai
