= Guindy division =

Guindy division is a revenue division in the Chennai district of Tamil Nadu, India. It comprises the taluks of Alandur, Guindy, Mylapore, Sholinganallur and Velachery.
