= Nandeeswarar Temple =

Religion
- Affiliation: Hinduism
- District: Chennai
- Deity: Lord Nandeeswarar

Location
- Location: Chennai
- State: Tamil Nadu
- Country: India
- Interactive map of Nandeeswarar Temple

Nandeeswarar Temple is located in Adambakkam (off Karuneegar Street) in Chennai, Tamilnadu, India. It is close to St. Thomas Mount suburban railway station. The temple has two entrances one in the east, and another in the south. There is a tank situated outside the southern entrance, though not in use.

Sri Nandeeswarar Temple is an ancient temple (fondly called as Sivan temple by local people) located in Chennai near St. Thomas Mount (Adambakkam). The main deity is Sri Nandheeswarar and Goddess is Sri Aavudai Nayagi (Gomathi in Sanskrit).

== Deities ==
Dedicated to Lord Shiva, the presiding deity of the temple is in the form of Nandi standing in front of his devotee Sage Birungi.

The temple houses separate worship places for Vinayaka, Nagadevathai, Vishnu, Subramanyar, Bairavar, Brahma, Durga, Sandikeswarar and Navagrahas. The idol of Nandeeswarar (Siva lingam) faces east and the Goddess Avudainayagi faces south.

Vilvam tree is the stala viruksham of this temple.

== Special Poojas ==
Special poojas are conducted on days like Pradhosham, Shivratri and Somawar (Mondays). Arudra darshan is yet another famous religious event here.

Also other special pujas are conducted on days significant to Lord Subramanya and Lord Ganesha.

== History ==
The temple has lot of mythology associated with it and locals often claim the temple to be constructed by Adhani (hence the name Adambakkam) Cholan yet the temple is only around 950 years old. Also in the form of Nandhi(holy bull), Lord Shiva appeared before Bringi Maharishi. (So pooja to Nandhi is done after pooja to Lord Shiva, unlike in other temples.) Hence the name of Lord Shiva is Nandeeswarar. And the mount was called as "Bringi malai", now changed as 'Parangi malai'. This sage kept his kalasam (kindy, as it is called in Tamil) on some places and did pooja, so the adjacent place is called as Guindy.
