= PZA =

PZA may refer to:

- Pyrazinamide, a medication used to treat tuberculosis
- PZA Loara, a Polish armored radar-directed self-propelled anti-aircraft gun system
- PZA, the station code for Pazhavanthangal railway station, Chennai, Tamil Nadu, India
