= Palavanthangal =

- neighbourhood
- Nickname: pallavanthangal
- Location within Chennai Location within Tamil Nadu Location within India
- Coordinates: 12.989537°N 80.186291°E
- Country: India
- State: Tamil Nadu
- District: Chennai
- Metro: Chennai

Government
  - Body: Greater Chennai Corporation

Languages
  - Official: Tamil
- Time zone: UTC+5:30 (IST)
- PIN: 600114
- Vehicle registration: TN-22
- Planning agency: CMDA
- Civic agency: Greater Chennai Corporation

Pazhavanthangal (also called Palavanthangal or "Pallhavanthangal") is a southern neighbourhood of Chennai, India. It is served by the Pazhavanthangal railway station of the Beach-Tambaram suburban railway route in Chennai. It is one of the neighborhoods that is very close to the Chennai International Airport. It comes under the Alandur constituency.

Named after the small settlement with the same name adjoining the station, the railway station also caters to the bigger region of Nanganallur. This station came into being in the 1970s and lies between St. Thomas Mount and Meenambakkam railway stations. This serves as the railway node to the Vembuli Amman Temple, Rajarajeshwari Temple and the Anjaneyar Temple with a 32-feet idol of Hanuman and the adjoining temples of Nanganallur. Close to it is the Palavanthangal subway which serves as the main road entry to Nanganallur from the GST Road. There is also a TASMAC outlet near the railway station.

Palavanthangal was anglicised from its original name Pallavan Thaangal. The area and its neighborhoods were ruled by Pallava rulers; there was a water tank which was dug by one of the Pallava rulers during his regime. The place around the water tank was called thaangal in Tamil. As it was built by a Pallava king, the place was known as Pallavanthaangal. The area is one of many settlements of Kamma Naidu during the reign of king Krishnadevarayar.

An Air India colony, a quarter for the employees of Air India, the Kendriya Vidyalaya School and the Trident Hotel are all located near Pazhavanthangal station.
