= Swami silver =

Style of silverware from Madras, India

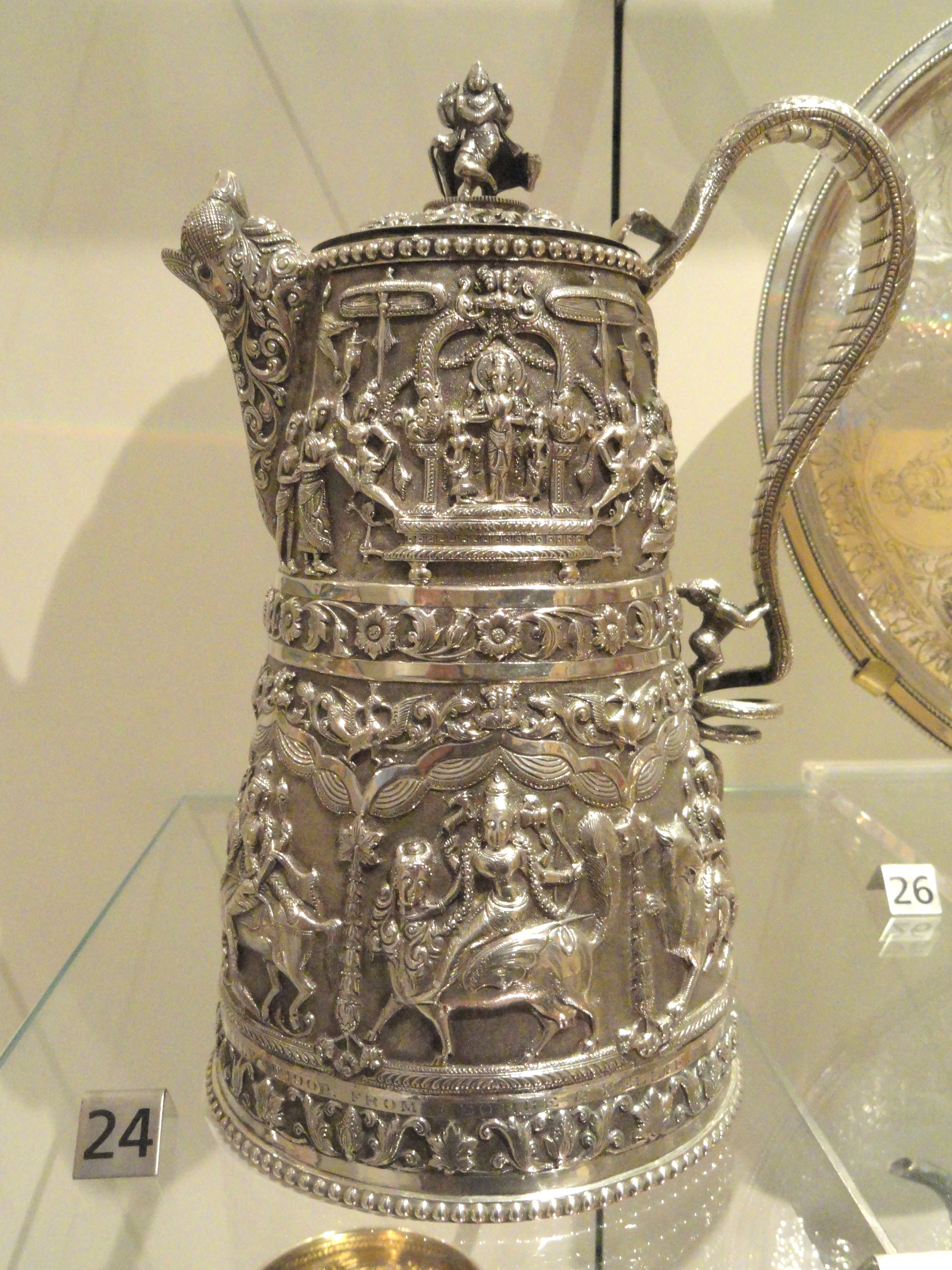
Jug with a Western shape, with Hindu scenes in repoussé, c. 1890, Chennai

Swami silver is the name given to a distinctive style of silverware that originated in the South Indian city of Chennai (then called Madras) under the British Raj. It is characterised by figures of Hindu deities. A variety of designs emerged these included: trays, tea sets, tankards, jugs, goblets, ewers, trophies and visiting card cases called Swami, meaning God in Tamil, from its depiction of deities.

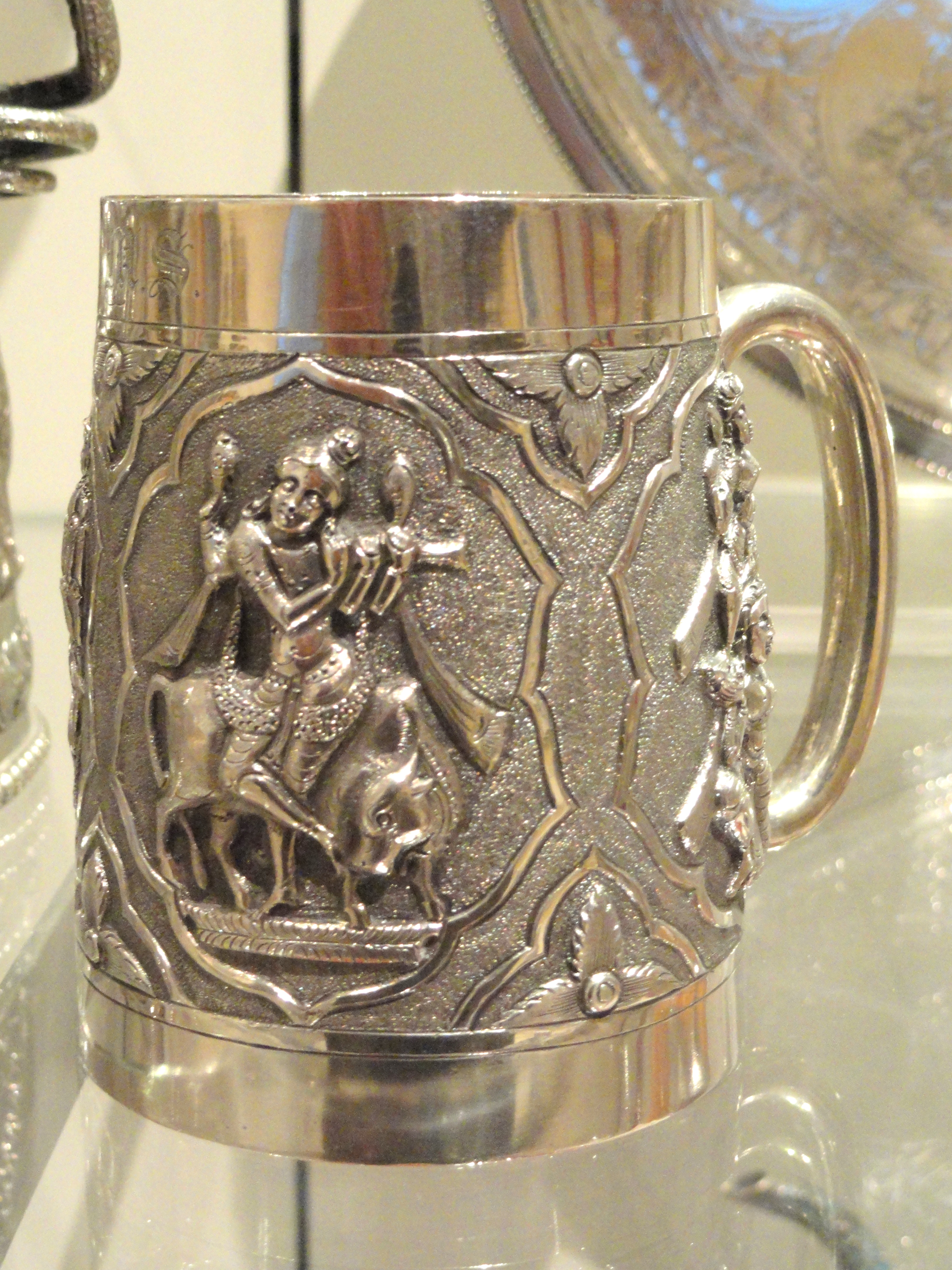
Child's mug, with Hindu scenes, P. Orr & Sons, Chennai, Tamil Nadu, c. 1890

Swami silver was pioneered and popularised by an English company, P.Orr & Sons. The Orr brothers, Peter and Alexander, arrived in Madras from Scotland in 1843. They made their initial fortune by selling ice, before joining the watchmaker George Gordon & Co. When Gordon retired in 1849, they took over the business and diversified into gold, diamonds and silverware. The jewellery business closed in 1944 at the height of The Second World War. The company went back to its original business of selling watches.

In 1875, and when the Prince of Wales visited India in 1876, they were commissioned to make special ceremonial gifts by various maharajas. The maharajas of Indore and Baroda had tea services made, while the maharaja of Cochin commissioned a complete dessert service. In 1876, P Orr and Sons was designated as "Manufacturing Jewellers, Gold and Silversmiths to His Royal Highness the Prince of Wales, By Special Appointment". The silversmiths who worked in their atelier were initially British, but soon Indian craftsmen became better in this work. Swami silver combined English form with Hindu motifs and was characterized by extraordinary attention to detail. The deities were fashioned in exceptionally crisp high relief achieved by brilliant repoussé, and included Rama, Krishna, Shiva, Ganesha, Hanuman and Lakshmi. Many pieces were monogrammed "ORR & Sons, Madras.", "P. Orr & Sons of Madras," or just "ORR".

Competition began emerging for P Orr and Sons, mainly in Bangalore and Tiruchirappalli. The first was Krishnaiah Chetty & Sons in Bangalore. Though highly prized for its ornate design, swami silver had critics in England for the excessive use of Hindu motifs. Omarsi Maoji of Kutch cashed in on this demand for secular designs and their version of swami silver featured more animals and birds and fewer gods.
