= Raghava Nagar =

Coordinates: 12°58′04″N 80°11′07″E

Raghava Nagar is a residential area within Madipakkam, a southern suburban of Chennai (formerly known as Madras), in Tamil Nadu, India. It is near to Moovarsampet pond. There is a welfare association which conducts elections yearly.

Kalimagal Mat Hr. Sec School is placed in the First Main Road, in the same road you can find Kaliyangudi Hotel.

Bus Stop : Koot Road MRTS Station : St. Thomas Mount, velachery
