= Subramania Nagar =

- village
- Location within Chennai Location within Tamil Nadu Location within India
- Coordinates: 12.979384°N 80.195003°E
- Country: India
- State: Tamil Nadu
- District: Chennai

Languages
  - Official: Tamil
- Time zone: UTC+5:30 (IST)
- Vehicle registration: TN-

Subramania Nagar is a residential area within Madipakkam, a southern suburb of Chennai (formerly known as Madras), in Tamil Nadu, India.

== History ==
Subramania Nagar is one oldest inhabited parts of Madipakkam. As early as 1975, people began moving to the suburb. Before the current residential settlement, it was an agricultural area.

In 2023, the area was severely affected by the monsoon season, with flooding and sewage overflow affecting residents in Subramania Nagar. In 2024, parts of Subramania Nagar had no drinking water due to maintenance problems at the local waterworks.

== Culture ==
Subramania Nagar Welfare Association exists to provide social welfare activities for the residents.

15 August, Independence Day is celebrated every year at Subramania Nagar First Street.

== Transport ==
The Rangarajapuram flyover road adjoins part of Subramania Nagar.

Bus Stop: Madipakkam Koot Road

Train Station: St. Thomas Mount

MRTS Station: Velachery
