= Adambakkam Lake =

- Location within India
- Location: Chennai district, Tamil Nadu, India
- Coordinates: 12.9868°N 80.1964°E
- Type: Lake

Adambakkam Lake is a lake in Chennai district, Tamil Nadu. This lake gives the name for the nearby locality of Chennai, the area of Adambakkam.

== Chennai Monsoon times ==
This lake also provides a place for the flood water to drain into during the monsoon. This makes the lake very significant, like all lakes in the Chennai district. But the Water Hyacinth occupying the areas in and around the lake is a major worry for the people near it, as it retains some the flood water.

== Voluntary efforts at the lake ==
E.F.I (Environmentalist Foundation of India) along with other social groups has been active in volunteering at the lake. Over several weekends volunteers had manually cleaned the lake.
