= A. M. Jain College =

Indian educational institution

Coordinates: 12.985006°N 80.179644°E

A.M. Jain College, situated in Meenambakkam near Chennai, Tamil Nadu, India, was established in 1952. The institution provides courses in the arts, sciences and information technology along with visual communication courses. The college's campus is located opposite the Meenambakkam Railway Station. The college is managed by the Jain Community Associations and is affiliated with Madras University.

== Overview ==
The college provides both aided and self-financed programmes which conducts courses like B.Sc, B.Com., BCA, M.Sc. (IT) and MA (Communication). The college has two libraries, one for each of the sections. Annual day celebrations and sports meet are the big festivals. A professional sports field holds division matches from time to time.

== History ==
In 1952, the Agurchand Manmull Jain College was established by the magnanimity and munificence of Padmasri Mohanmulji Chordia through the Sri.S.S.Jain Educational Society, at the Inspiration of her Holiness Shri.Sayar Kanwarji Maharaj. Shri. Sri Prakasa, the then Governor of Madras Presidency, performed the auspicious task of inauguration on 25 June 1952 at the Jain Boarding Home Premises in Madley Road, T.Nagar. The college was shifted to its new campus in Meenambakkam in 1954. On that occasion, two educationists, Dr. S. Radhakrishnan (the then vice-president of India) and Dr. A. Lakshmanaswami Mudaliar (the then Vice-Chancellor of the University of Madras) attended. The former laid the foundation stone and the latter presided over the function.

The college celebrated its Silver Jubilee in 1977, its Golden Jubilee in 2002 and its Diamond Jubilee in 2012. The college which started as a college for men was upgraded into a co-educational institution in 2003. As of 2016, it is a frontline top ranking research and post-graduate institution. There are three research departments – physics, mathematics and economics – as well as post-graduate courses in commerce, chemistry, physics, economics and mathematics and basic graduate courses in eight major fields of study.
