= Alandur taluk =

Taluk of Chennai district

Coordinates: 12.998530°N 80.195430°E

Alandur
- Taluk
- Interactive map of Alandur
- Country: India
- State: Tamil Nadu
- District: Chennai

Population (2011)
  - Total: 678,927

Alandur taluk is a taluk of the district of Chennai in the Indian state of Tamil Nadu. The centre of the taluk is the neighbourhood of Alandur. The headquarters of the taluk is Guindy division. On 4 January 2018, Chennai district annexed Alandur taluk.

== Demographics ==
The 2011 census has the population of Alandur taluk at 678927: 340848 males and 338079 females. There were 992 women for every 1000 men. The taluk had a literacy rate of 83.38. Child population in the age group below 6: 33229 Males and 32456 Females.

== Revenue Villages ==
1. Adambakkam
2. Alandur
3. Madhananthapuram
4. Manappakkam
5. Meenambakkam
6. Mukalivakkam
7. Nandambakkam
8. Nanganallur
9. Palavanthangal
10. Thalakanaacheri
