= Velachery railway station =

Railway station in Chennai, India

Velachery
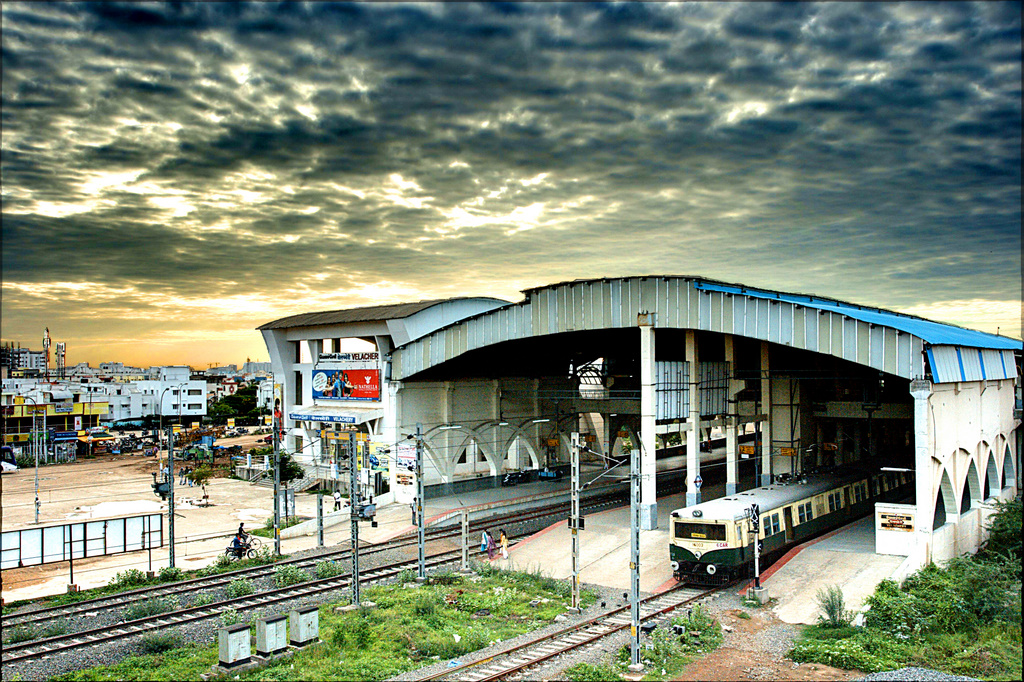
- Velachery MRTS station

General information
- Coordinates: 12°58′03″N 80°13′08″E
- System: Chennai MRTS
- Platforms: Side platform Platform-1 → Chennai Beach; Island platform Platform-2 → St. Thomas Mount; Platform-3 → Chennai Beach; Side platform Platform-4 → Chennai Beach (280 m)
- Tracks: 3

Construction
- Structure type: At grade
- Platform levels: 1
- Parking: Yes

Other information
- Station code: VLCY

History
- Opened: 19 November 2007

Passengers
- 2026: 70,000/day

Services
Preceding station	Chennai MRTS	Following station
Perungudi towards Chennai Beach	Line 1	Puzhuthivakkam towards St. Thomas Mount
Location

The Velachery MRTS Station is a ground level station on the Chennai MRTS railway line in Chennai. It is located near the junction of Velachery Main Road and Inner Ring Road in Velachery. The station is built on the northern banks of Pallikaranai wetland.

== History ==
The station was opened on 19 November 2007. The EMU maintenance shed at the station was opened in 2008. The extension of the MRTS line from this Velachery station to St. Thomas Mount was opened on 14 March 2026.

== Structure ==
The length of the platform is 280 m. The station premises also consists of 12,250 sq m of open parking area.

=== Station layout ===
G	Street Level & Mezzanine	Exit/ Entrance, Fare control, Station ticket counters and Automatic ticket vending machines
P	Side platform | Doors will open on the left
P	Platform 1 Eastbound	Towards → Chennai Beach; Next Station: Perungudi
P	Platform 2 Westbound	Towards ← St. Thomas Mount; Next Station: Puzhuthivakkam
P	Island platform | P2 Doors will open on the left | P3 Doors will open on the right
P	Platform 3 Eastbound	Towards → Chennai Beach; Next Station: Perungudi
P	Side platform | Doors will open on the right
P

== EMU shed ==
The station has a massive shed for preventive maintenance of electrical multiple unit (EMU) rakes, which is spread over 44 hectares. Before the opening of the shed in 2008, maintenance of the all MRTS rakes were being sent to Avadi. However, the shed has been lying in disuse for the past few years. Due to this, there are currently no mid-night services between Chennai Beach station and Velachery.

== Additional infrastructure ==
A bus bay in front of the station, set to become the biggest in south Chennai, is under construction at a cost of ₹ 100 million, jointly executed by the Southern Railway and the state government. To be built in about 60,000 sq m of land, the depot will be owned by the state government.

A 3.4 km-long, 18 m-wide access road to Perungudi station and Taramani station was constructed.

== Patronage ==
The station primarily serves the residential community of Velachery and its neighbouring suburbs such as Pallikaranai. The Velachery station receives the highest patronage among all the MRTS stations.

== Developments ==
In September 2013, the Indian Railway Catering and Tourism Corporation (IRCTC) invited tenders for setting up a food plaza in the station, along with two other stations, namely, Thirumayilai and Thiruvanmiyur.

== See also ==
- Chennai MRTS
- Chennai suburban railway
- Chennai Metro
- Transport in Chennai
