= Guindy taluk =

Taluk of the city district of Chennai, Tamil Nadu

Coordinates: 13.0084125°N 80.2126875°E

Guindy
- Taluk
- Interactive map of Guindy

Guindy taluk is a taluk of the city district of Chennai in the Indian state of Tamil Nadu. It was formed in December 2013 from parts of the erstwhile Mambalam-Guindy taluk and the Mylapore-Triplicane taluk. It comprises the neighbourhoods of Adyar, Alandur, T. Nagar, Ekkaduthangal, Guindy and Kotturpuram.

Mambalam-Guindy taluk

1. Adyar Firka: Adyar (Part 2), Govt.Farm, Guindy Park, Venkatapuram
2. Ekkattuthangal Firka: Adyar (Part 1), Ekkatuthangal, Alandur
3. Thyagaraya Nagar Firka: Thyagaraya Nagar

Mylapore-Triplicane taluk

1. Kottur Firka: Kottur
