= P.Orr & Sons =

Indian chain of watch and clock stores

P. Orr & Sons
- Founded: 1846
- Founder: Peter Orr
- Headquarters: Chennai
- Products: Handicrafts, Watches
- Owner: Loyal Group

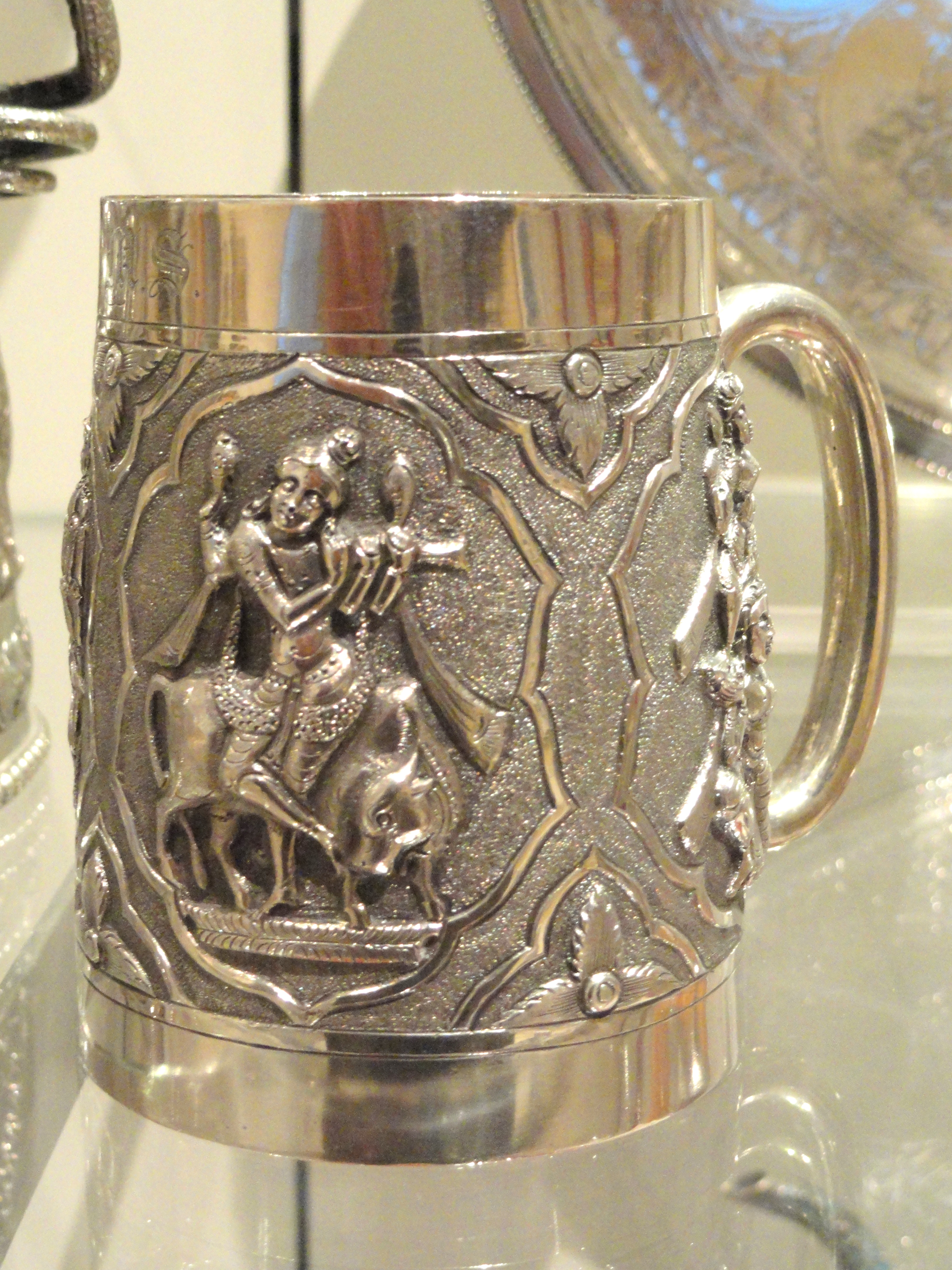
Child's mug, Swami silver style, c. 1890, P.Orr & Sons

P.Orr & Sons, founded in 1846, is a chain of stores that sells watches and clocks based in the city of Chennai in India. It used to primarily make clocks, and at the end of the 19th century, various objects in the style known as Swami silver, with European shapes but Hindu decoration.

It was started by Peter Orr from Scotland in 1846 on the foundation of the nascent George Gordon & Co.

== History ==
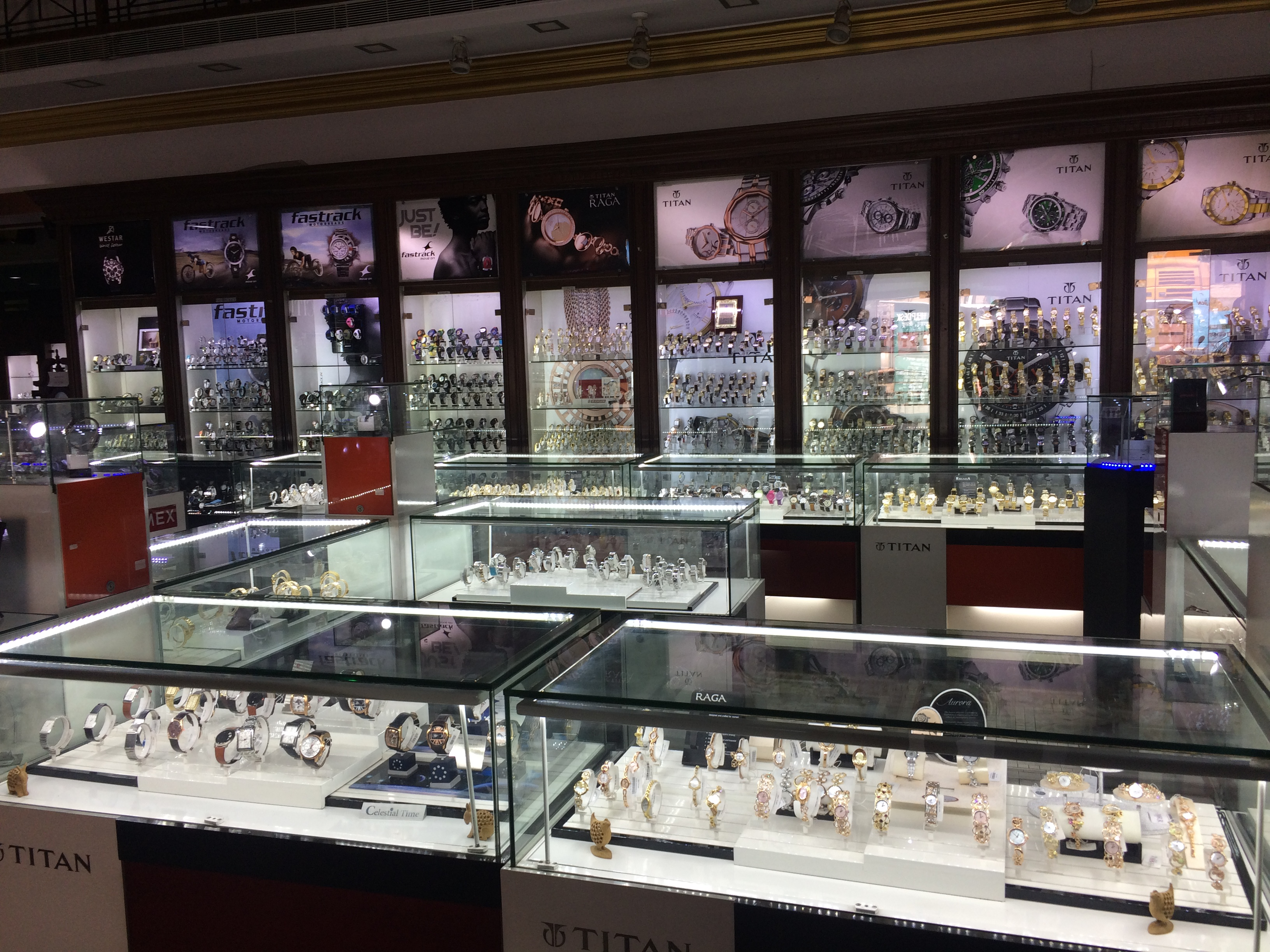
P.Orr & Sons, Anna Salai showroom

The first showroom of P.Orr & Sons was opened at Anna Salai in the year 1879 which is today a heritage building and still in operation. The building was commissioned by Scottish watchmaker Peter Orr, and designed by Robert Chisholm, consulting architect to the Government of Madras. It was inaugurated by Prince George, Duke of York, who later became King George V, and Princess Mary of Teck, who later became Queen Mary. The store initially sold diamonds, equipment, guns, silver good, and later began selling mechanical watches and clocks. This is the place where first Rolex watch was sold in India for 198rs. The establishment was sold to Karumuttu Thiagarajan Chettiar's, a famous Textile Mill baron in 1967. Today the chain of stores is part of his Loyal Textiles group.

== Heritage Building ==
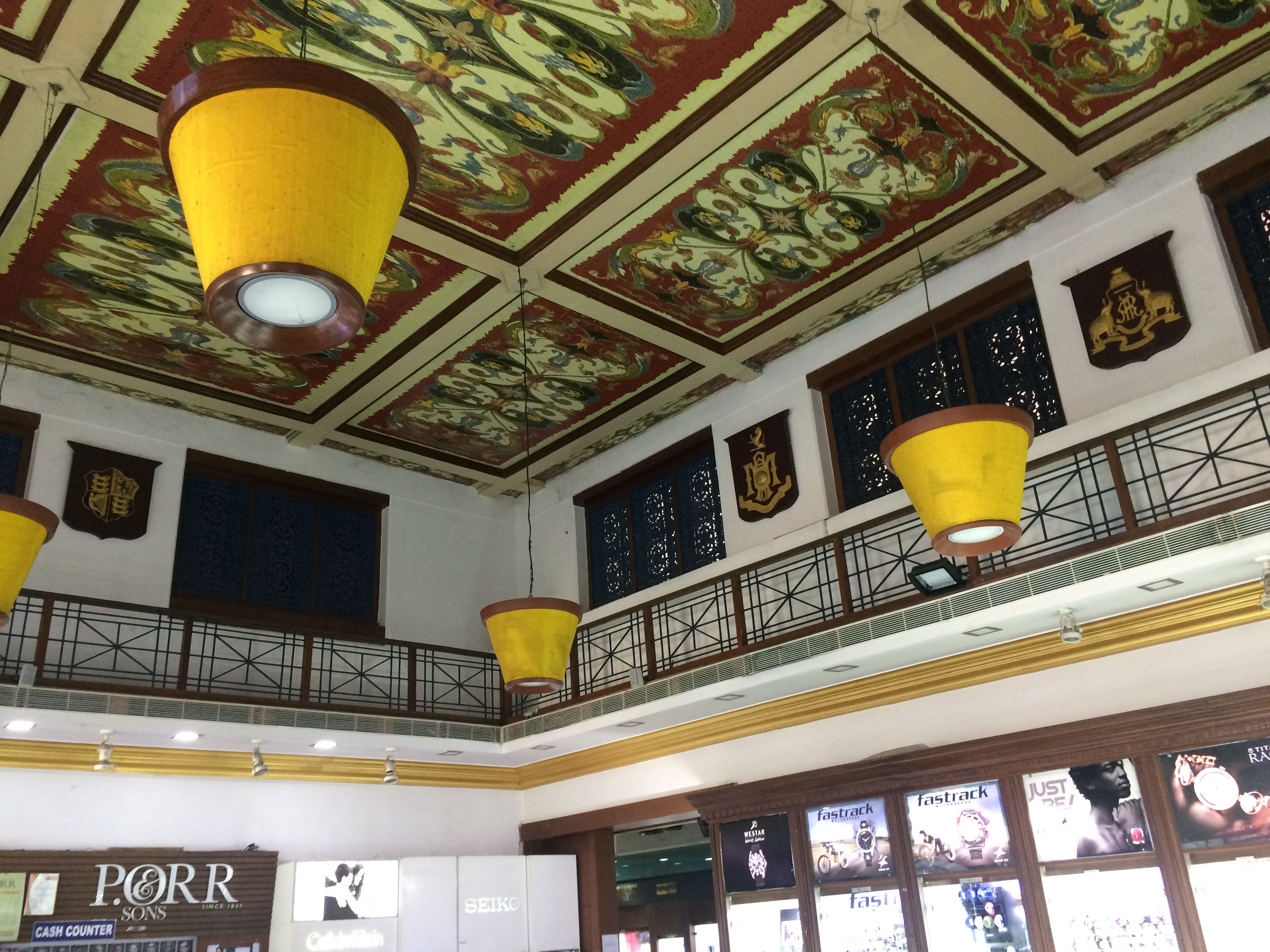
P.Orr & Sons Interior

The P.Orr & Sons store at Anna Salai came into controversy when the CMRL proposed the demolition of some parts. However the proprietors contended that the store was a heritage site and cannot be altered. The Madras High Court favored the demolition of certain parts as the evidence for it being a heritage site was not substantial. The demolition of these parts of the building by CMRL caused further damage to other parts of the building, and in 2013 the city corporation demanded the demolition of a further 894 square feet of the building for safety reasons. P.Orr & Sons began restoration work on the damaged structure, and applied to the high court to block the corporation's order. In November 2014, the court ruled in favour of the corporation and allowed further parts of the building to be demolished.

== See also ==
- Heritage structures in Chennai
