= Perungudi Lake =

- பெருங்குடி ஏரி (Tamil)
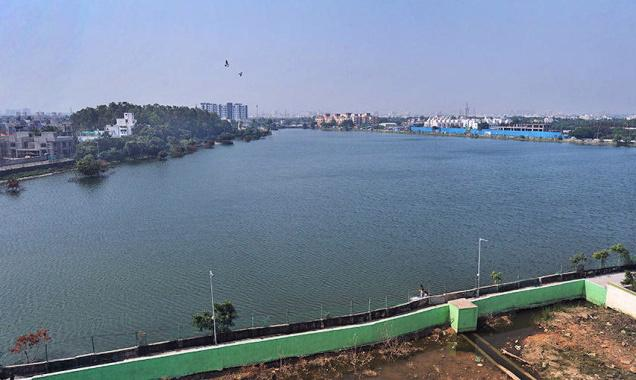
- Perungudi Lake

- Location within India
- Location: Chennai, India
- Coordinates: 12.967°N 80.239°E
- Type: lake
- Surface area: 50 ares (54,000 sq ft)

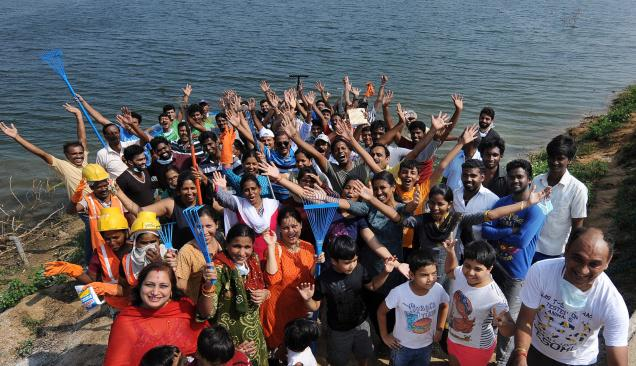
Perungudi Lake Area Neighborhood come together for Protecting the Lake

Perungudi Lake (Tamil: பெருங்குடி ஏரி) is a 50 ares (54,000 sq ft) water body located near Chennai's IT corridor, Rajiv Gandhi Salai, India. It is one of the few protected lakes of Chennai, fully fenced with compound wall and pathways laid on its east and south side for walkers.

In the past, the lake was a major source of water for irrigation to its neighborhood agricultural lands. Presently it is still catering to the drinking water needs of few colonies surrounding the lake, and holds the ground water levels. Excess rain later flows into the lake through storm water channels from the nearby residential areas.

Perungudi lake is connected with Pallikaranai wetland through marsh lands spreading across Perungudi, Velachery, and Pallikaranai.

== 2015 flooding and reexamination ==
This lake reached its full capacity during the cloudburst that hit Chennai in December 2015. Prior to that not even 25% of water was retained by the lake due to poor maintenance of water inlets and encroachments. The beauty of the lake caught the attention of its nearby residents and motivated them to start a people's forum to protect the lake from pollution, abuse, encroachments, sewage water letdown, defecation, and water theft. From sprucing up the lake to hold a Lake Festival (PLF 2016- Perungudi Lake Festival 2016) on 26 January 2016, like-minded individuals from nearby 15 residential association joined hands together for the cause of protecting the lake as the Perungudi Lake Area Neighbourhood Environment Transformation (PLANET). PLANET is a registered body of all resident associations around Perungudi lake. PLANET celebrated PLF 2017 in the month of February 2017 with several art and cultural programs with a perspective of promoting waterbodies. PLANET planted several tree saplings around the lake and regularly monitoring its growth. TN PWD supports the activities by the PLANET.
