= Madipakkam, Chennai =

Neighborhood of Chennai, India

Madipakkam
- neighbourhood
- Madipakkam (Chennai) Madipakkam (Tamil Nadu) Madipakkam (India)
- Coordinates: 12.96487°N 80.19611°E
- Country: India
- State: Tamil Nadu
- District: Chennai
- Metro: Chennai

Government
  - Body: CMDA
- Elevation: 34 m (112 ft)

Population (2001)
  - Total: 14,940

Languages
  - Official: Tamil
- Time zone: UTC+5:30 (IST)
- PIN: 600091
- Vehicle registration: TN-22
- Planning agency: CMDA

Madipakkam is residential locality situated in south of Chennai, India. As of 2016, it has been merged with the Greater Chennai Corporation (GCC).

== Demographics ==
As of 2001 India census, Madipakkam had a population of 14,940. Males constitute 51% of the population and females 49%. Madipakkam has an average literacy rate of 98%, higher than the national average of 59.5%: male literacy is 90%, and female literacy is 95%. In Madipakkam, 9% of the population is under 6 years of age.

== Madipakkam Lake ==
The Madipakkam Lake spans over 60 acres and is a local ecological and recreational spot where people and birds flock alike. The present-day Lakeview area is the result of two decades of consistent efforts of conservation by the GCC, the local population and environmental organisations who have transformed the area from a barren land to a thriving hub of birds, insects, and aquatic life. As of 2015, the region is an ecologically protected zone that hosts 25-50 birds every migratory season. The lake is also a popular fishing spot for the locals, and the bank of the lake is lined with eateries that become busy in the evenings. In the mornings and evenings, the perimeter of the lake is a haven for fitness enthusiasts, joggers, and senior citizens who enjoy leisurely walks. Apart from the Madipakkam Lake, the surrounding areas have many small lakes such as the Puzhuthivakkam Lake, the Nanganallur hidden lake, and other minor ponds and water bodies. While poor sewage and waste management issues persist, the Madipakkam Lake continues to be an important local social and ecological hub.

== Bus routes ==
- M45A Madipakkam to Vivekanandar House, via : Velachery, Saidapet, Nandanam, Alwarpet, Royapettah
- 51M Madipakkam to T. Nagar, via : St. Thomas Mount, NGO Colony, Guindy, Saidapet, CIT Nagar
- 21LX Madipakkam to Broadway, via : Velachery, Little Mount, Adyar, Foreshore Estate, Santhome, Chepauk, Marina Beach, St. George Fort
- S82 Madipakkam to Alandur, via : Moovarasanpet, Puluthiwakkam, Nanganallur, St. Thomas Mount
- M1 Madipakkam to Thiruvanmiyur, via : Velachery, Tharamani, SRP Tools, TIDEL Park
- 18D Madipakkam to Broadway, via : St. Thomas Mount, NGO Colony, Guindy, Saidapet, Nandanam, Teynampet, DMS, LIC, Chennai Central

== See also ==
- Raghava Nagar
- Subramania Nagar
