= Meenambakkam =

Neighborhood of Chennai, India

Meenambakkam, Chennai
- Meenambakkam, Tamil Nadu Meenambakkam, Chennai (Tamil Nadu) Meenambakkam, Chennai (India)
- Coordinates: 12.987500°N 80.175300°E
- Country: India
- State: Tamil Nadu
- District: Chennai district
- Metro: Chennai
- Elevation: 41 m (135 ft)

Population (2016)
  - Total: 24,334

Languages
  - Official: Tamil
- Time zone: UTC+5:30 (IST)
- PIN: 600027
- Vehicle registration: TN-22
- Website: www.chennaicorporation.gov.in

Meenambakkam is a southern neighbourhood of Chennai in the Indian state of Tamil Nadu. It is home to Chennai International Airport, the Airports Authority of India regional office, and the DGQA Complex. It was under the reign of the Pallava kingdom. The name Meenambakkam signifies that it is a settlement near the coast. Pakkam means a settlement near to the coast. Meenambakkam was cherished with lakes, ponds and borderlines the Adyar river. This makes it a rich source of fishes. Hence the name Meenambakkam was coined.

== Temples ==
Sri Radha Rukmani Sametha Venugopala Perumal Temple

Sri Radha Rukmani Sametha Sri Venugopala Perumal Temple located at V.O.C street, Meenambakkam is one of the prominent attraction in this location. The temple was established in the year 1920, as simple Bajanai Kovil. After time and years passed the temple was reconstructed into a concrete structure with a main Sanctum for Sri Radha Rukmani and Venugopala Perumal as the main deity and Sridevi Boodevi Sametha Varadaraja Perumal as urchava moorthy. Aadi perukku, Sri jayanthi, Puratasi Sanikizhamai and Vaikuntha Ekadashi are the major festivals celebrated here.

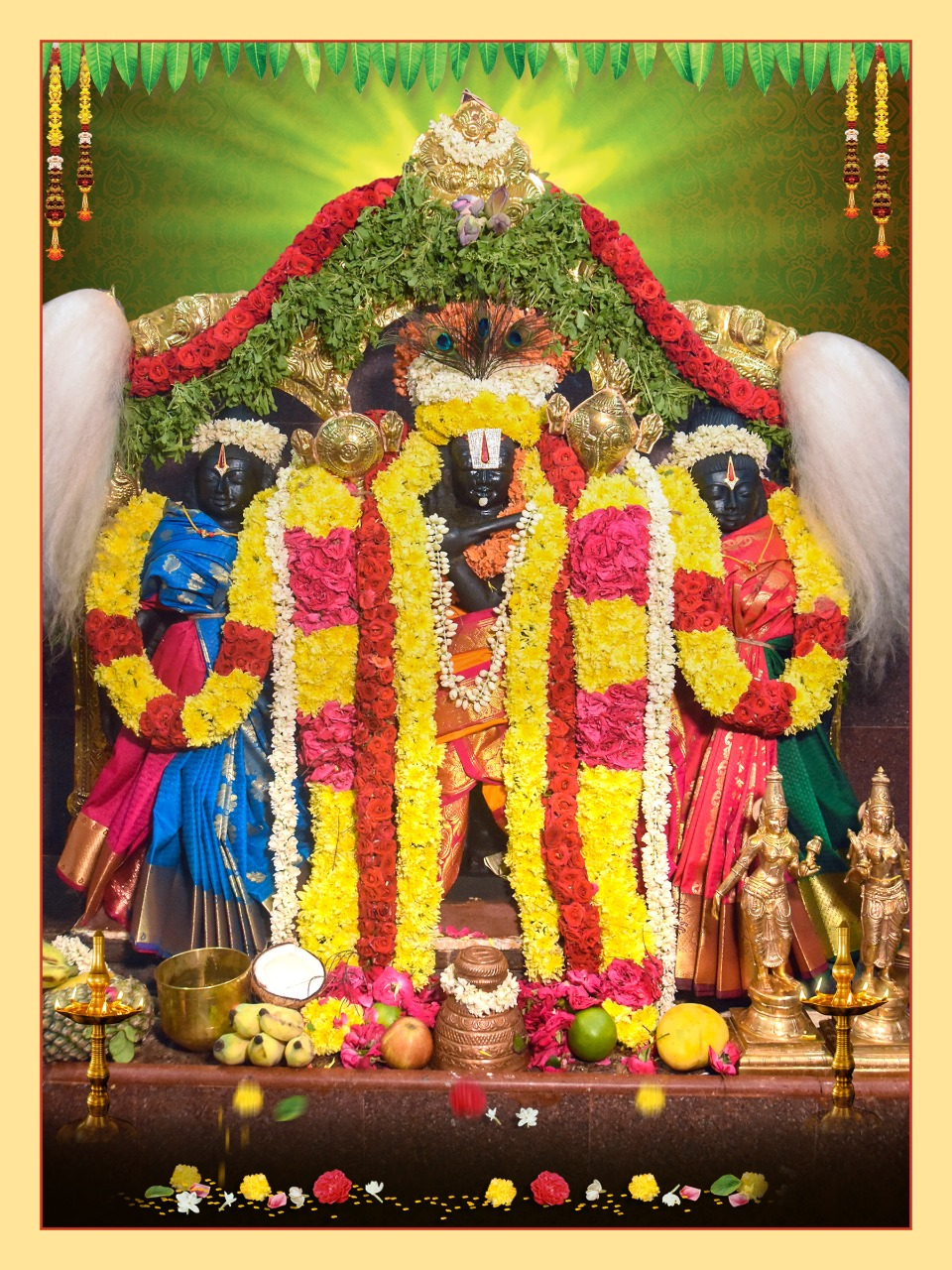
Sri Radha Rukmai Sametha Venugopala Perumal Main Deity

The temple is closer to the Meenambakkam bus stop, Metro Station and railway station.

=== Sridevi Sakthi Santhiamman Temple ===
Sridevi Sakthi Santhiamman Temple is one of the oldest temples in the city situated amidst the airport. The deity is called Santhiamman as she is believed to safeguard the village sitting at the santhi, which means junction in Tamil. Santhiamman is worshiped by the local people.

=== Sridevi Periyapalayathamman Temple ===
Sridevi Periyapalayathamman Temple is one of the major temples situated in the locality. The goddesses is worshiped by the local villagers and the annual festival of this temple is the major celebration of the village. There are reports of mismanagement of the temple funds by the sitting committee, lack of maintenance of the temple structure, and failure to conduct regular festivals.The temple is currently closed for renovation but until now no progress has happened. It has been almost a year since the committee closed the temple.

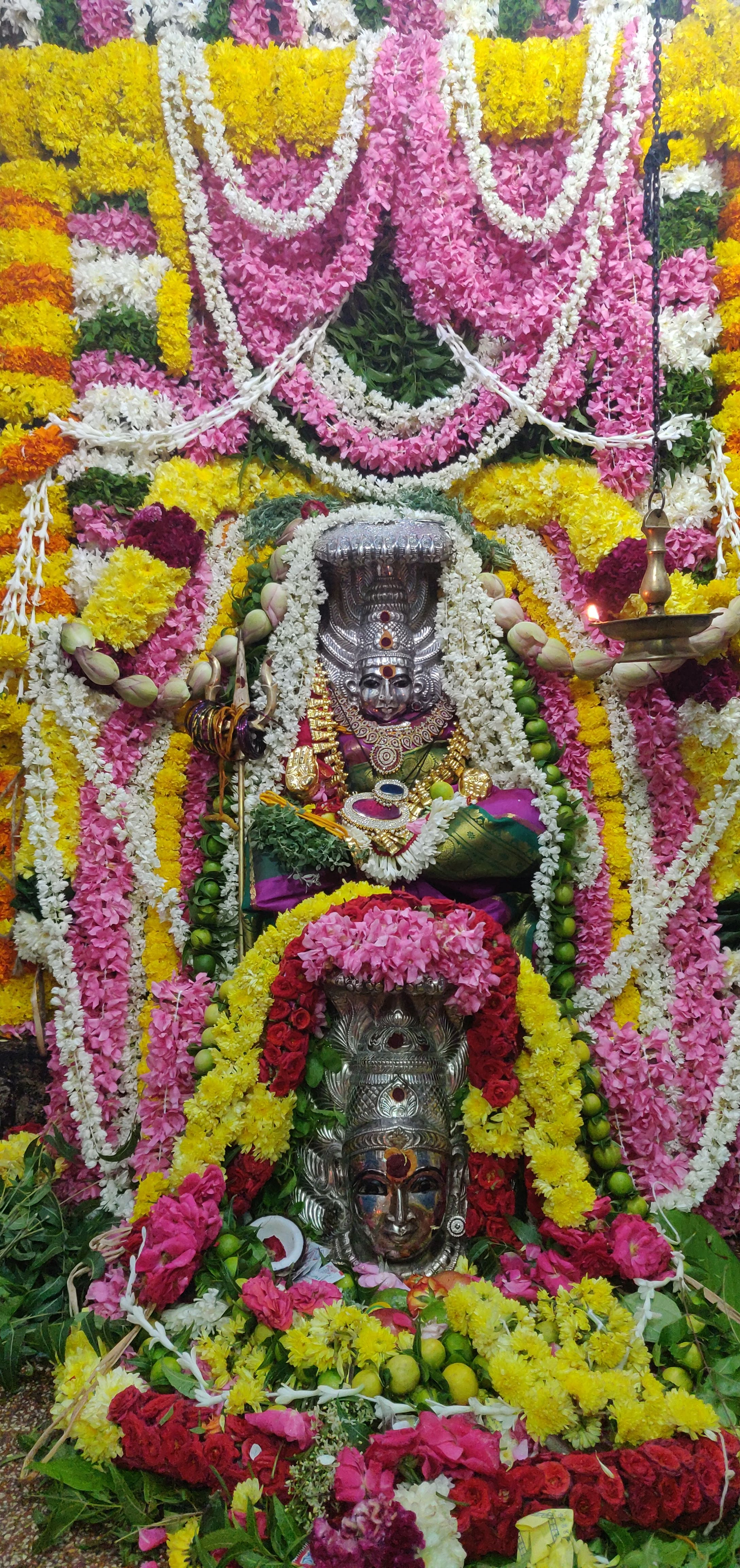
Main deity at the Sridevi Periapalayathamman temple in the neighbourhood

== Education ==
- Government Adi Dravida Welfare Higher Secondary School
- Government Adi Dravida Welfare Primary School
- Kendriya Vidyalaya Meenambakkam
- Kendriya Vidyalaya DGQA
- Civil Aviation School
- Little Flower School (till UKG or Sr KG)
- Kalyanamayee Primary and Nursery School (until fifth)
- A. M. Jain School (CBSE Board)
- Prince Matriculation school
- A. M. Jain College

== Politics ==
Meenambakkam comes under Greater Chennai Corporation Zone 12. The ward number in GCC is 159. It comes under Pallavaram assembly constituency in Tamil Nadu, India, that was formed after constituency delimitation in 2007 and Alandur Constituency. Located in newly formed Chennai district, it is included in the Sriperumbudur parliamentary constituency for Lok Sabha elections.

== Demographics ==
Historical population
Year	Pop.	±%
1891	3,609	—
1981	3,092	−14.3%
1991	3,802	+23.0%
2001	4,774	+25.6%
2011	6,241	+30.7%
Sources: 1981 - 2001: G. Dattatri (10–11 February 2005). WATER SUPPLY AND SANITATION IN PERI-URBAN CHENNAI – CASE STUDY FINDINGS. Service Provision Governance in the Peri-Urban Interface of Metropolitan Areas. p. 8.

As of the 2016 Indian census, Meenambakkam had a population of more than 6,241. The voting population numbered 3,620, with 1,790 male and 1,830 female voters.

== Transportation ==
Chennai Suburban Railway Network

Meenambakkam Railway Station is one of the railway stations of the Chennai Beach–Chengalpet section of the Chennai Suburban Railway Network. It serves the neighbourhood of Meenambakkam, a suburb of Chennai. It is situated at Grand Trunk Road across Chennai International Airport Cargo Terminal, with an elevation of 18 metres (59 ft) above sea level. It is an upcoming busiest Suburban Railway station, which is also accessed by neighbourhood of Nanganallur, Moovarasampettai.

Metro

The Meenambakkam Metro station, comes under the Blue Line, which is a part of the Chennai Metro, was introduced in 2016. Initially it ran between Chennai International Airport and Koyambedu, later the line is extended to Washermanpet, as a part of Blue Line.

== Theatres ==
Meenambakkam has several theatres:Aero HUB PVR at the airport, Velan and Vetrivel (also known as Ranga theatre), Janatha Theatre Pallavaram, Vetri, and Rakesh in Chrompet and recently PVR had launched its new Multiplex theatre at Thirusoolam Named PVR Grand Galada.

== See also ==
- Meenambakkam bomb blast
