= Mylapore taluk =

Human settlement in Chennai, Tamil Nadu, India

Mylapore
- Taluk
- Interactive map of Mylapore

Mylapore taluk is a taluk of the city district of Chennai in the Indian state of Tamil Nadu. It was formed in December 2013 from parts of the erstwhile Fort-Tondiarpet and Mylapore-Triplicane taluks. It comprises the neighbourhoods of Chintadripet, Mylapur and Triplicane.

1. Chintadripet Firka: Chintadripet [Fort-Tondiarpet Taluk], Triplicane (Part 1) [Mylapore-Triplicane Taluk]
2. Mylapore Firka: Mylapore South/Mylapore (Part 2)
3. Royapettah Firka: Mylapore North/Mylapore (Part 1)
4. Triplicane Firka: Triplicane (Part 2)
