= Alandur =

Neighborhood of Chennai, India

- neighbourhood
- Alandur, Tamil Nadu Alandur (Tamil Nadu) Alandur (India)
- Coordinates: 12.997500°N 80.200600°E
- Country: India
- State: Tamil Nadu
- District: Chennai
- Metro: Chennai
- Elevation: 39 m (128 ft)

Population (2011)
  - Total: 164,430

Languages
  - Official: Tamil
- Time zone: UTC+5:30 (IST)
- Vehicle registration: TN-22

Alandur is a zone of Chennai corporation, and an urban node in Chennai district in Guindy division in the state of Tamil Nadu, India. It is surrounded by Guindy in the north and east, Adambakkam in the south, Pazhavanthangal in the south-west and Parangimalai (St. Thomas Mount) in the north-west. As of 2011, Alandur had a population of 164,430. The town agglomeration of Alandur will have an estimated population of 300,000 by 2030. Alandur neighbours the St. Thomas Mount Cantonment, the Officers Training Academy of the Indian army and the nearby towns of Guindy and Adambakkam. M. G. Ramachandran, a former chief minister of Tamil Nadu started his political career by winning his first legislative election from Alandur in 1967. Alandur also holds famous landmarks of Chennai namely Nehru Statue and Kathipara Junction.

== Geography ==
Alandur is located at 13.03°N 80.21°E. It has an average elevation of 12 metres (39 ft).

== Demographics ==
Historical population
Year	Pop.	±%
1981	97,449	—
1991	125,244	+28.5%
2001	146,154	+16.7%
2011	164,430	+12.5%

According to 2011 census, Alandur had a population of 164,430 with a sex-ratio of 997 females for every 1,000 males, much above the national average of 929. A total of 16,074 were under the age of six, constituting 8,246 males and 7,828 females. Scheduled Castes and Scheduled Tribes accounted for 11.62% and 0.25% of the population respectively. The average literacy of the town was 85.23%, compared to the national average of 72.99%. The town had a total of 43411 households. There were a total of 64,698 workers, comprising 290 cultivators, 319 main agricultural labourers, 650 in house hold industries, 56,643 other workers, 6,796 marginal workers, 141 marginal cultivators, 146 marginal agricultural labourers, 199 marginal workers in household industries and 6,310 other marginal workers. In 2011, Alandur had a growth rate of 12 percent.

=== Religion ===
Religious census
Religion	Percent(%)
Hindu	84.09%
Muslim	7.08%
Christian	7.94%
Sikh	0.06%
Buddhist	0.04%
Jain	0.25%
Other	0.51%
No religion	0.03%

As per the religious census of 2011, Alandur had 84.09% Hindus, 7.08% Muslims, 7.94% Christians, 0.06% Sikhs, 0.04% Buddhists, 0.25% Jains, 0.51% following other religions and 0.03% following no religion or did not indicate any religious preference. There are many temples, churches and mosque in the area.

== Educational institutions ==
Schools

- St. Peters Matriculation Higher Secondary School
- The PSBB Millennium School
- Mont Fort High School
- Mahesh Institute
- Kiruba Primary School
- The Hindu Colony Chellammal Vidyalaya
- Modern Senior Secondary School
- Vyasa Vidyalaya School
- AIM Nursery and Primary School
- Prince Matriculation Higher Secondary School
- Immanuel Primary School
- National Matriculation Higher Secondary School
- A.J.S. Nidhi Higher Secondary School
- Indira Gandhi Matriculation School
- Hindustan International school

== Education Trust ==
- NAJA Educational and Social Charitable Trust
- Alandur Baithulmaal Trust & Associations
- Devasitham Charitable Foundation (DCF) Voice

== Economy ==
MGR Market or Alandur grocery market is about 200 years old. It is located in the middle of MKN Road (MKN Road starts from Guindy and ends at Meenabakkam Airport in GST Road). Alandur groceries market was donated to local marketeers by M. G. Ramachandran, a philanthropist and a former chief minister of Tamil Nadu.

== Transportation ==
Alandur is well connected with road network system and round the clock bus facility is available. Kathipara Junction is at Alandur; there are several bus routes. It has the RTO for Meenambakkam at its former municipal building, which issues registration series TN-22.

The nearest railway station is St. Thomas Mount railway station; there are plans to accommodate five modes of public transport – suburban railway, Southern Railway, Metro Rail, MRTS and public buses. The St. Thomas Mount Railway station will be providing a facility to accommodate 1200 cars. This will be the first time that a commercial space of two floors will be attached with the transit station. The work is in-progress.

== Politics ==
Alandur (State Assembly Constituency) is part of Sriperumbudur (Lok Sabha constituency).
