= Pazhavanthangal railway station =

Railway station in Chennai, India

Palavanthangal Pazhavanthangal
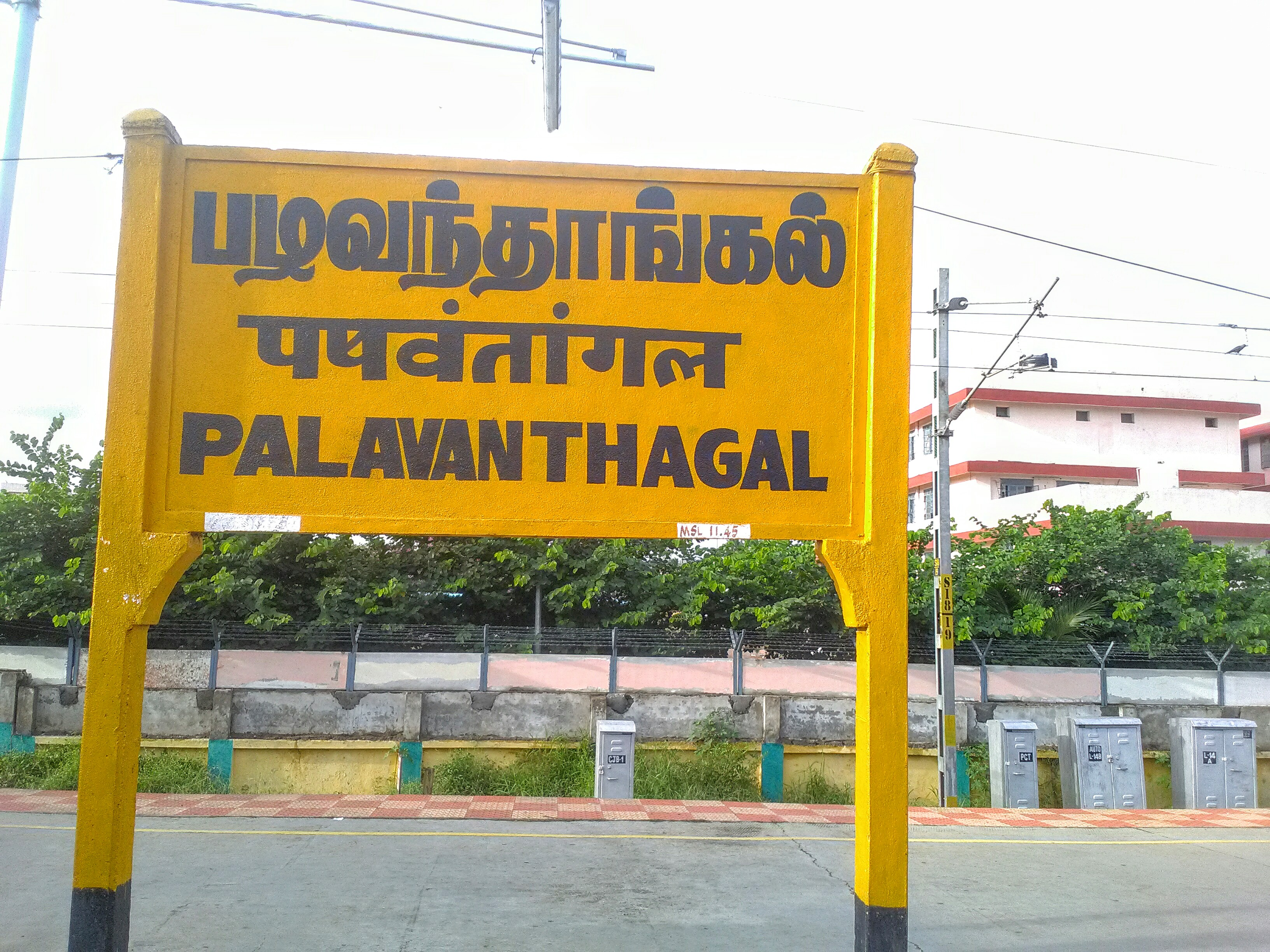

General information
- Location: Pazhavanthangal, Chennai, Tamil Nadu 600 114, India
- Coordinates: 12°59′26″N 80°11′17″E
- System: Indian Railways and Chennai Suburban Railway station
- Owner: Ministry of Railways, Indian Railways
- Lines: South and South West lines of Chennai Suburban Railway

Construction
- Structure type: Standard on-ground station
- Parking: Available

Other information
- Station code: PZA
- Fare zone: Southern Railways

History
- Opened: Early 1900s
- Electrified: 15 November 1931
- Former names: South Indian Railway

Services
Preceding station	Chennai Suburban	Following station
St. Thomas Mount towards Chennai Beach	South Line	Meenambakkam towards Tambaram, Chengalpattu Junction or Villupuram Junction
Route map
Chennai Beach — Villupuram
Location

Pazhavanthangal railway station also known as Nanganallur Station is one of the railway stations of the Chennai Beach–Chengelpet section of the Chennai Suburban Railway Network. It serves the neighbourhood of Pazhavanthangal and surrounding areas. It is situated about 18 km (11 mi) from Chennai Beach, and has an elevation of 12 m (39 ft) above sea level.

== History ==
Pazhavanthangal railway station lies on the Madras Beach—Tambaram suburban section of the Chennai Suburban Railway, which was opened to traffic on 11 May 1931. The tracks were electrified on 15 November 1931. The section was converted to 25 kV AC traction on 15 January 1967.

== The station ==
=== Platforms ===
There are a total of 4 platforms and 4 tracks. The platforms are connected by foot overbridge. These platforms are built to accumulate 24 coaches express train. The platforms are equipped with modern facility like display board of arrival and departure of trains.

=== Station layout ===
G	Street level	Exit/Entrance & ticket counter
P1	FOB, Side platform | Doors will open on the left
P1	Platform 1	Towards → Chennai Beach; Next Station: St. Thomas Mount
P1	FOB, Island platform | P1 Doors will open on the left/right | P2 Doors will open on the right
P1	Platform 2	Towards ← Tambaram / Chengalpattu Jn / Villuppuram Jn; Next Station: Meenambakkam
P1	Platform 3	Towards → Chennai Egmore
P1	FOB, Island platform | P3 and P4 | (Express Lines)
P1	Platform 4	Towards ← Chengalpattu Junction
P1

== See also ==
- Chennai Suburban Railway
- Railway stations in Chennai
