= Velachery taluk =

Taluk of the city district of Chennai

Coordinates: 12.9758°N 80.2205°E

Velachery
- Taluk
- Interactive map of Velachery

Velachery taluk is a taluk of the city district of Chennai in the Indian state of Tamil Nadu. It was formed in December 2013 from parts of the erstwhile Mambalam-Guindy and Mylapore-Triplicane taluks. It comprises the neighbourhoods of Besant Nagar, Tharamani, Thiruvanmiyur and Velachery.

- Mambalam-Guindy taluk
1. Besant Nagar Firka: Kalikundram, Pallipattu, Urur
2. Thiruvanmiyur Firka: Thiruvanmiyur
3. Tharamani Firka: Kaanagam, Tharamani, Velachery (Part 2) [Mylapore-Triplicane taluk]
- Mylapore-Triplicane taluk
1. Velachery Firka: Velachery (Part 2)
