= Nanganallur =

Neighborhood of Chennai, India

- Neighbourhood
- Nickname: Temple town
- Nanganallur நங்கநல்லூர் (Chennai) Nanganallur (Tamil Nadu) Nanganallur (India)
- Coordinates: 12.9807°N 80.1882°E
- Country: India
- State: Tamil Nadu
- District: Chennai
- Metro: Chennai
- Zone: Alandur (Zone 12)
- Ward: 166, 167

Government
  - Body: Greater Chennai Corporation
- Elevation: 53 m (174 ft)

Languages
  - Official: Tamil
- Time zone: UTC+5:30 (IST)
- PIN: 600061
- Vehicle registration: TN-22
- Planning agency: CMDA
- Civic agency: Greater Chennai Corporation

Nanganallur or Nangainallur is one of the southern neighborhoods of Chennai, India. Since September 2011, it has become a part of Chennai Corporation. It is a residential area close to the Chennai International Airport.

== History ==
The name 'Nanganallur' is derived from the name 'Nangainallur'. The presiding deity of the Rajarajeshwari Temple in Nanganllur is also referred to as 'Nangai' by the locals, which is why this place's name translates to the land of 'Nangai'. Since the mid-1980's, Nanganallur has seen a rapid increase in infrastructure, with numerous residential apartments, restaurants, shops and many more popping up here and there. This place is home to numerous temples, thus earning the name of a temple town. It's well renowned as a comfortable residential location due to its proximity to the airport, the southern suburbs and also the city centre.

== Demographics ==
As of the 2001 Indian census, Nanganallur had a population of 86,230. As a result of Chennai's booming IT business and setting up of IT parks in the suburbs, a lot of people moved into suburbs like Nanganallur.

Towards the end of 2009, it was announced that the Chennai Corporation would be expanded to cover the surrounding 42 local bodies. This was confirmed by the new government in 2011. Nanganallur thus became a part of Chennai Corporation from September 2011.

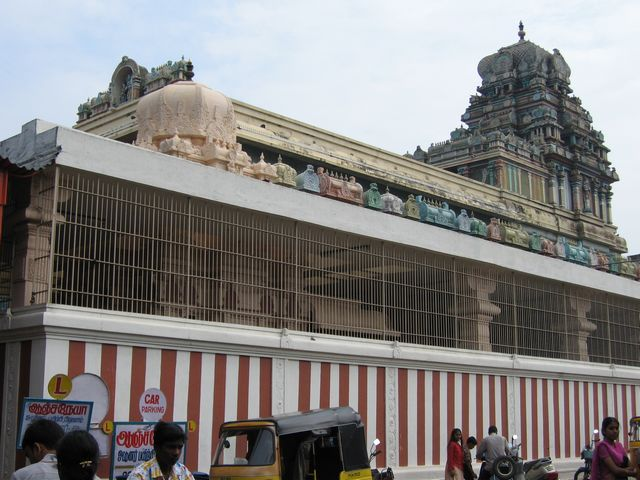
Lord Hanuman temple in Nanganallur

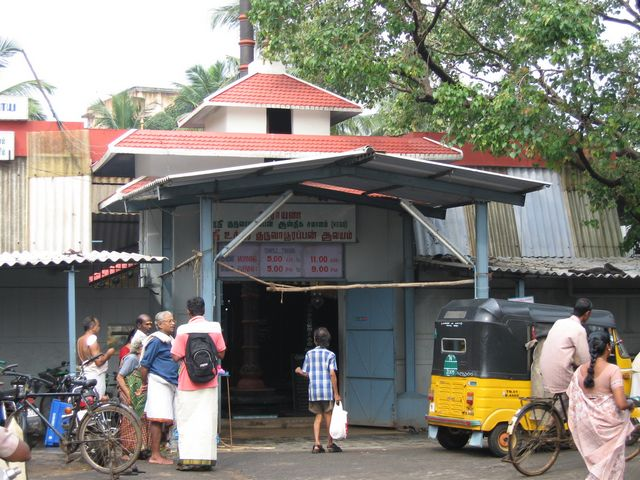
Lord Guruvayaurappan temple in Nanganallur

== Sporting facilities ==
Nanganallur has a roller skating rink on 100 Feet Road near the Civil Aviation Colony, which was developed on a 12,000-square-foot (1,100 m²) open ground by the Alandur Municipality. It was opened in June 2011 at a cost of ₹ 3.1 million. The rink is 325 feet (99 m) long and 30 feet (9.1 m) wide and it is the longest in the whole of Tamil Nadu. The facility has an office room.

== Living and schools ==
Educational institutions here include Jaigopal Garodiya Girls Higher Secondary School, A.M. Jain Senior Secondary School, Meenambakkam, Modern Senior Secondary School, The Hindu Colony Chellammal Vidyalaya Senior Secondary School, Rajkumar Sulochana Matric Hr. Sec. School, Nehru Government Boys' Higher Secondary School, Kendriya Vidyalaya Meenambakkam and DGQA, Prince Matriculation Higher Secondary School, St. Peter's Matriculation Higher Secondary School (one of the oldest schools in Nanganallur, with over 150 years of history), and P.M.S. Matriculation Higher Secondary School.

The Indian Coast Guard has its residential enclave for its personnel near Nanganallur.

== Infrastructure and connectivity ==
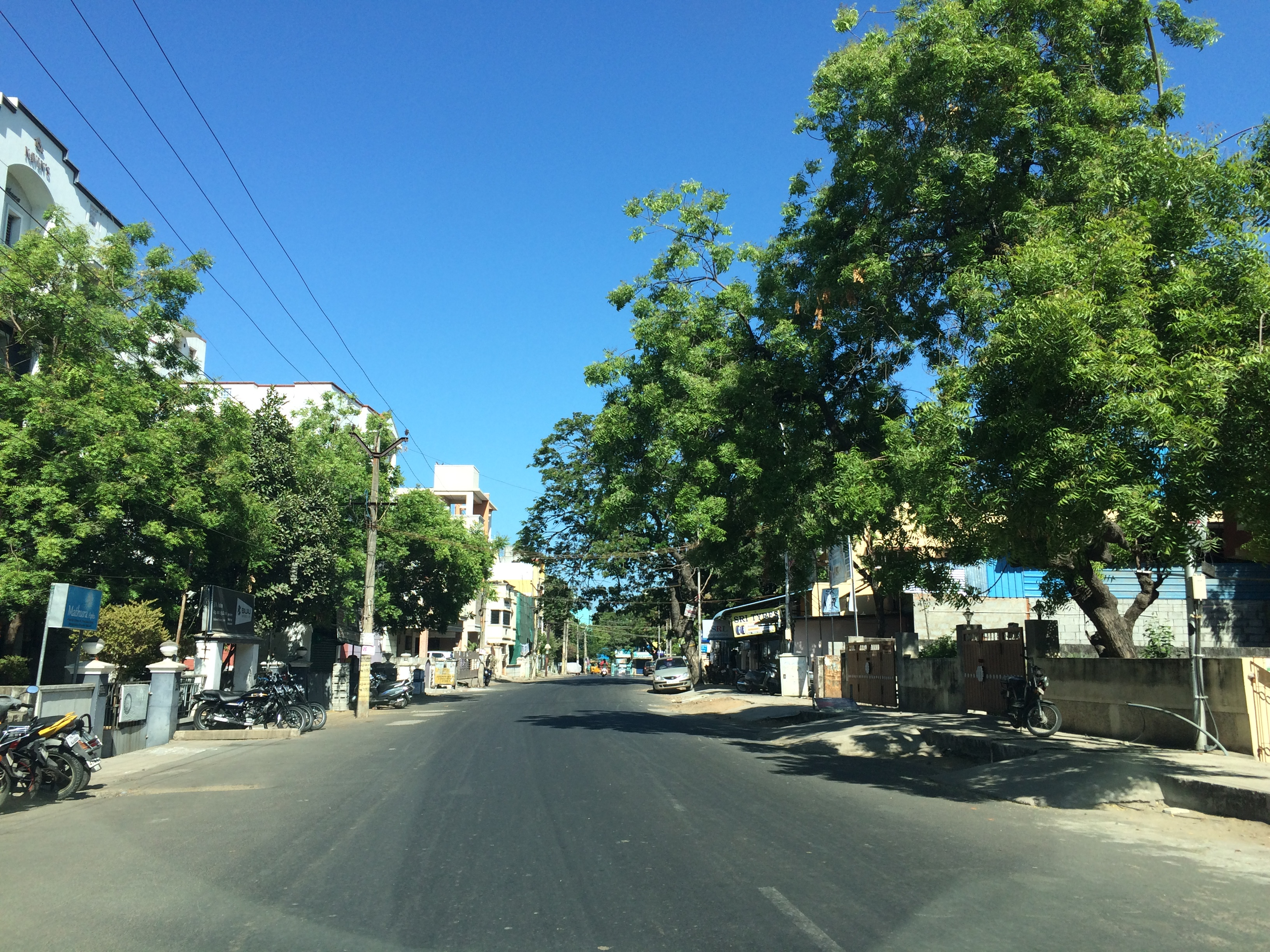
1st Main Road in Nanganallur, Chennai

Nanganallur is connected by suburban trains at nearby railway station Palavanthangal and Meenambakkam and also through MTC city buses. Buses which ply to or through Nanganallur are 52L, 52K, 52P, M18C, M18N, M21G, M154B, M1A, MN45B, M152N. Three or four mini buses are introduced in Nanganallur route. Access from the city is through the main road from the Grand Southern Trunk Road at the Trident Hotel Junction, just north of the airport. Nanganallur has two Subways Palavanthangal and Thillai Ganga Nagar to connect to GST road, But heavy rains could create problems for residents to reach the city by usually flooding the Palavanthangal subway. The inner ring road from Thillai Ganga Nagar Subway connects Nanganallur to Velachery and is a major lifeline to the people for commuting to the city during the monsoons.

There are two railway stations serving the neighbourhood, namely, the Palavanthangal railway station and the Meenambakkam railway station. Most people in the neighbourhood use Palavanthangal railway station to reach Nanganallur. The nearest Chennai Metro railway station is Nanganallur road. Meenambakkam Metro also near to south west Area of Nanganallur.

The problem of connectivity from Nanganallur to GST and other main parts of the city has been a long-standing one. AS Nangallur lacks frequent bus services, residents have been relying on sub-urban trains plying through Pazhavanthangal station as their only means of quick and reliable transport. With no direct buses to Velachery (which is a stone's throw away), Nanganallur has become cut off from all major parts of the city with accessibility restricted to only commuters with private modes of transport.

== Temples ==
There are lots of temples around this area. The main temples are Dharmalingeshwarar Temple, Ardhanareeshwarar Temple, Vembuli Amman temple, Ellaiamman (B V nagar), eleur amman temple, Vidha raja rajeshwari temple, Adivyathihara Bhakthanjaneya temple (32-feet Hanuman temple), Raja Rajeshwari temple, Uthira Guruvayurappan temple, Lakshmi Narasimha temple, Karumariamman temple, Ragavendra temple, Lakshmi Hayagrivar temple, Sri Iyappan Temple, Sri Sakthi Vinayagar Temple( which has rich tradition in pooja to Maa Varahi & Sakthi VEL Pooja) - in TNGO COLONY, Sri Kubera Ganapathi Temple in the Hindu Civil Aviation Colony and Sri Varasithi Vinayagar Temple in Hindu Colony, Thirumal Marugan Temple, Murugan temple, Maha periyava sharanalayam, Saibaba temple, among others.

== Hospitals ==
- Apollo Multispeciality Clinic 044-4560 5000
- Radiant Dental Care
- Bharath Hospital
- Cure Advanced Dental Care
- Hindu Mission Hospital
- Hariharan Institute of Diabetes
- Rotary Central Margaret Sidney Hospital
- Sri Chakra Multi Speciality Hospital
- Pankajam Memorial Hospital
- CM Hospital
- BM Hospital
- KF hospital
- Agarwal eye hospital
- Lakshmi eye clinic
- Shankara nethralaya eye hospital (Alandur)
