= List of people from Madurai =

The following is a list of notable people from the Indian city of Madurai, Tamil Nadu.

== Religious figures ==
- Bodhisena
- Chithalai Chathanar
- Mangayarkkarasiyar
- Manikkavacakar
- Kulachirai Nayanar
- Santhananda

== Scholars ==
- Ganapathy Baskaran
- Augustus De Morgan
- S. Subramania Iyer
- Solomon Pappaiah
- Vida Dutton Scudder

== Dancers ==
- Rukmini Devi Arundale – Bharatanatyam dancer; founder of the Kalakshetra Foundation, an art and cultural academy
- Anita Ratnam – classical and contemporary dancer

== Entrepreneurs and business leaders ==
- Chitra Bharucha – former vice chairman of the BBC Trust
- Rajashree Birla – wife of Aditya Vikram Birla
- Karumuttu Thiagarajan Chettiar – Indian independence activist, industrialist and the founder of Thiagarajar College of Engineering and Thiagarajar School of Management
- Sundar Pichai – chief executive officer of Alphabet Inc. and its subsidiary Google Inc.

== Social activists ==
- Narayanan Krishnan
- Gopi Shankar Madurai – The Commonwealth Awardee, youngest candidate in the Tamil Nadu Assembly election and also the first openly intersex and genderqueer person to do so
- S. Swapna – first Indian transgender to take the Tamil Nadu Public Service Commission (TNPSC) recruitment examination for public-service employees in the Tamil Nadu state

== Literature ==
- Kausalya Hart
- Karmegha Konar
- Mu. Metha
- S. Abdul Rahman
- Ba. Venkatesan
- S. Venkatesan

== Music ==
- Madurai Mani Iyer
- Ramnad Raghavan
- T. N. Seshagopalan
- T. M. Soundararajan
- M. S. Subbulakshmi

== Film industry ==
- Ameer (director)
- Atlee (director)
- Bala (director)
- Bharathiraja
- Cheran (director)
- Chimbu Deven
- Susi Ganeshan
- G. Gnanasambandam
- Ilaiyaraaja
- Kanika
- Ganja Karuppu
- C. V. Kumar
- Maniratnam
- Meenal
- Pandi (actor)
- Solomon Pappaiah
- Mohan Raja
- Pattimandram Raja
- Ramarajan
- Jayam Ravi
- Samudrakani
- M. Sasikumar
- Vijay Sethupathi
- Shaam
- Robo Shankar
- Shanmugarajan
- Soori (actor)
- Srinivasan (Tamil actor)
- Karthik Subbaraj
- Vadivelu
- Velraj
- Vijayakanth
- Vivek (actor)

== Politicians and public servants ==
- P. Amudha
- S. K. Balakrishnan
- Mayandi Bharathi
- R. Chidambara Bharathi
- Angidi Chettiar – former vice president of Mauritius
- A. Vaidyanatha Iyer
- Jana Krishnamurthi
- P. Mohan
- S. Muthu
- Pazha Nedumaran
- P. T. Rajan
- Palanivel Rajan
- S. M. Muhammed Sheriff – former Consecutive Member of Parliament
- Nirmala Sitharaman – Minister of Finance
- Palanivel Thiagarajan

== Sportsmen ==
- A. Palanisamy
- Magesh Chandran Panchanathan
- Mohan Ukkrapandian

== Software ==
- Sundar Pichai
