= 2015 South India floods =

2015 Disastrous Floods

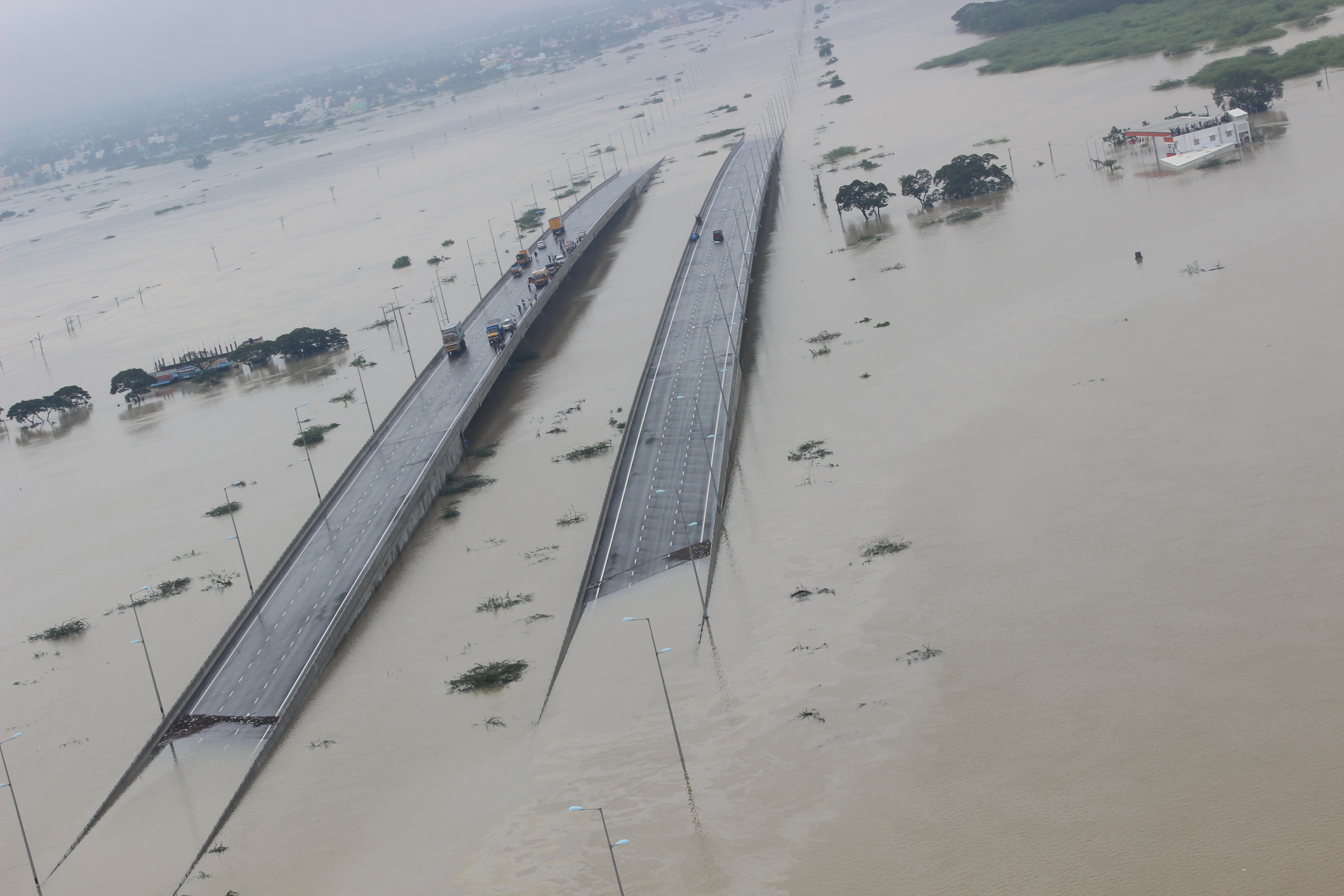
- Submerged bridges in Chennai
- Date: 8 November 2015 – 14 December 2015
- Location: South India (Tamil Nadu, Puducherry, Andhra Pradesh)
- Deaths: 500+ Tamil Nadu: 422 (official, likely more); Andhra Pradesh: 81; Puducherry: 3
- Property damage: ₹199 billion (US$2 billion) – over ₹1,000 billion (US$10 billion) (unofficial estimates); Tamil Nadu: ₹14,602 crore-₹50,000+ crore (US$2.2 billion-US$7.5+ billion, unofficial estimates); Andhra Pradesh: ₹4,960 crore (US$515 million); Pondicherry: ₹333 crore (US$35 million)

The 2015 South India floods resulted from heavy rainfall generated by the annual northeast monsoon in November–December 2015. They affected the Coromandel Coast region of the South Indian states of Tamil Nadu and Andhra Pradesh. More than 500 people were killed and over 1.8 million (18 lakh) people were displaced. With estimates of damages and losses ranging from nearly ₹200 billion (US$2 billion) to over ₹1 trillion (US$10 billion), the floods were the costliest to have occurred in 2015, and were among the costliest natural disasters of the year.

Though the unusually heavy rainfall in southern India during the winter of 2015 has been attributed to the 2014–16 El Niño event, in July 2018 the Comptroller and Auditor General of India (CAG) categorised the flooding across Tamil Nadu as a "man-made disaster", and held the Government of Tamil Nadu responsible for the scale of the catastrophe, which the latter had termed a natural disaster.

== Background ==
=== Geographical and meteorological explanation ===
From October to December each year, a very large area of south India, including Tamil Nadu, the coastal regions of the Andhra Pradesh and the union territory of Puducherry, receives up to 60 percent of its annual rainfall from the northeast monsoon (or winter monsoon). The northeast monsoon is the result of the annual gradual retreat of monsoonal rains from northeastern India. Unlike during the regular monsoon, rainfall during the northeast monsoon is sporadic, but typically far exceeds the amount produced by the regular monsoon by up to 90 percent. This excessive rainfall can be exacerbated by an El Niño of order of the magnitude which has since been evaluated to every year, such as 2015.

The coastal districts of Andhra Pradesh usually bear the brunt of heavy rains that occur during the northeast monsoon; with numerous river systems and wetlands, Puducherry and eastern Tamil Nadu are prone to flooding. The city of Chennai alone experienced five major floods between 1943 and 2005, with the 1943, 1978 and 2005 floods causing particularly severe damage. In addition, unplanned and often illegal urban development has led to many wetlands and natural sinks being built over; this, along with ageing civic infrastructure and poorly designed drainage systems, has resulted in an increased frequency of severe flooding.

=== Weather systems ===
On 8 November 2015, during the annual Cyclone season, a low-pressure area consolidated into a depression and slowly intensified into a deep depression before crossing the coast of Tamil Nadu near Puducherry the next day. Because of land interaction and high vertical wind shear, the system weakened into a well-marked low-pressure area over north Tamil Nadu on 10 November. The system brought very heavy rainfall over the coastal and the north interior districts of Tamil Nadu. On 13 November, Kanchipuram recorded 340 mm of rain and several low-lying areas were inundated and Vembakkam close to Kanchipuram recorded 470 mm. On 15 November, a well-marked low-pressure area moved northwards along the Tamil Nadu coast, dropping huge amounts of rainfall over coastal Tamil Nadu and Andhra Pradesh with 24‑hour totals peaking at 370 mm in Ponneri. Chennai International Airport recorded 266 mm of rainfall in 24 hours. On 28–29 November, another system developed and arrived over Tamil Nadu on 30 November, bringing additional rain and flooding. The system dropped 490 mm of rainfall at Tambaram in 24 hours starting 8:30 am on 1 December. Very heavy rains led to flooding across the entire stretch of coast from Chennai to Cuddalore. A study from IISc shows that on 1 December, clouds were stationary over Chennai. This study showed that the mountains of Eastern Ghats blocked clouds that came from the Bay of Bengal from moving further inland. The mechanism is referred to as 'upstream blocking'. Therefore, they were stationary over Chennai throughout the day. These clouds gave continuous rainfall over Chennai that caused massive flooding.

== Floods in Tamil Nadu ==
=== Chennai ===
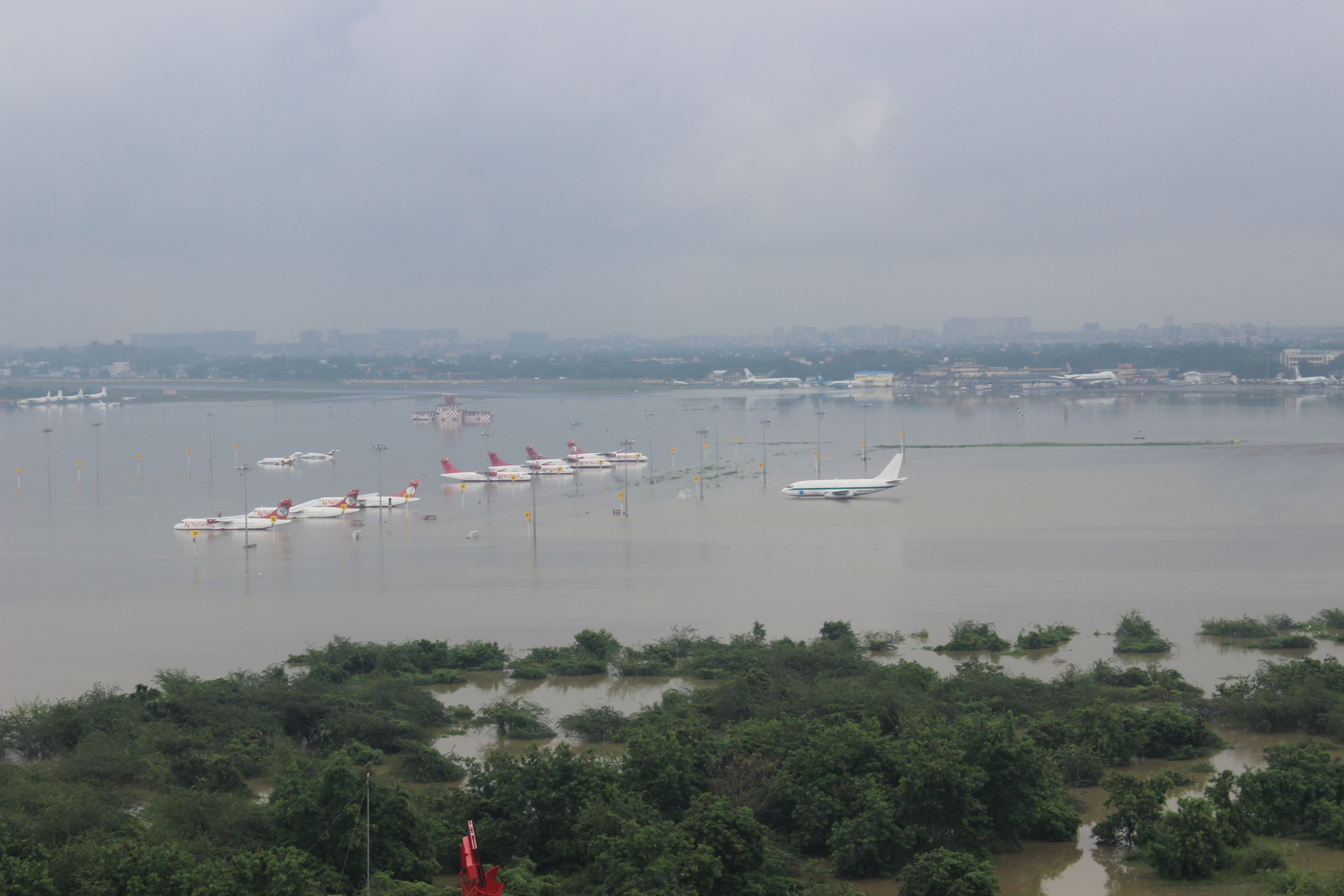
Aerial view of submerged Chennai International Airport

Between 9 and 10 November 2015, Neyveli received 483 mm (19.0 in) of rainfall; rains continued to lash Cuddalore, Chidambaram, Tiruvallur, Kanchipuram and Chennai. Several low-lying areas in Kanchipuram, including major thoroughfare Gandhi Road, were inundated as the city and its neighbourhood received a heavy precipitation of 340mm during the 24-hours that ended with 8.30 a.m. on 13 November 2015. The Manjalneer Kalvai, primarily a flood drain channel for the city, overflowed after the Netteri lake breached on the Kancheepuram-Vellore Road in the wee hours of Friday, flooding the entire stretch of Gandhi Road and Munusamy Mudaliyar Avenue and forcing the police to close for traffic the prime junction Moongil Mandapam where the Gandhi Road joins with Vallal Pachaiyappan Salai. Kanchipuram Collector R.Gajalakshmi told reporters later that a total of 7,294 persons were rescued from inundated areas and accommodated in 26 shelters opened by the civic body. Boats were used to rescue the people from inundated areas in Pillayarpalayam, the Collector said. And also Vembakkam close to Kanchipuram recorded 470mm of rain on 13 November 2015. Continuing rains led to low-lying parts of Chennai becoming inundated by 13 November, resulting in the evacuation of over 1000 people from their homes. The flooding in Chennai city was worsened by years of illegal development and inadequate levels of flood preparedness. Much of the city remained flooded on 17 November, though rainfall had largely ceased. Chennai received 1,049 mm (41.3 in) of rainfall in November, the highest recorded since November 1918 when 1,088 mm (42.8 in) in of rainfall was recorded. Kancheepuram district registered the heaviest rainfall—183% higher at 181.5 cm as against average rainfall of 64 cm in October–December period and Tiruvallur district recorded 146 cm compared to average 59 cm of rain. The flooding in Chennai city was described as the worst in a century. The continued rains led to schools and colleges remaining closed across Puducherry and Chennai, Kancheepuram and Tiruvallur districts in Tamil Nadu, and fishermen were warned against sailing because of high waters and rough seas.

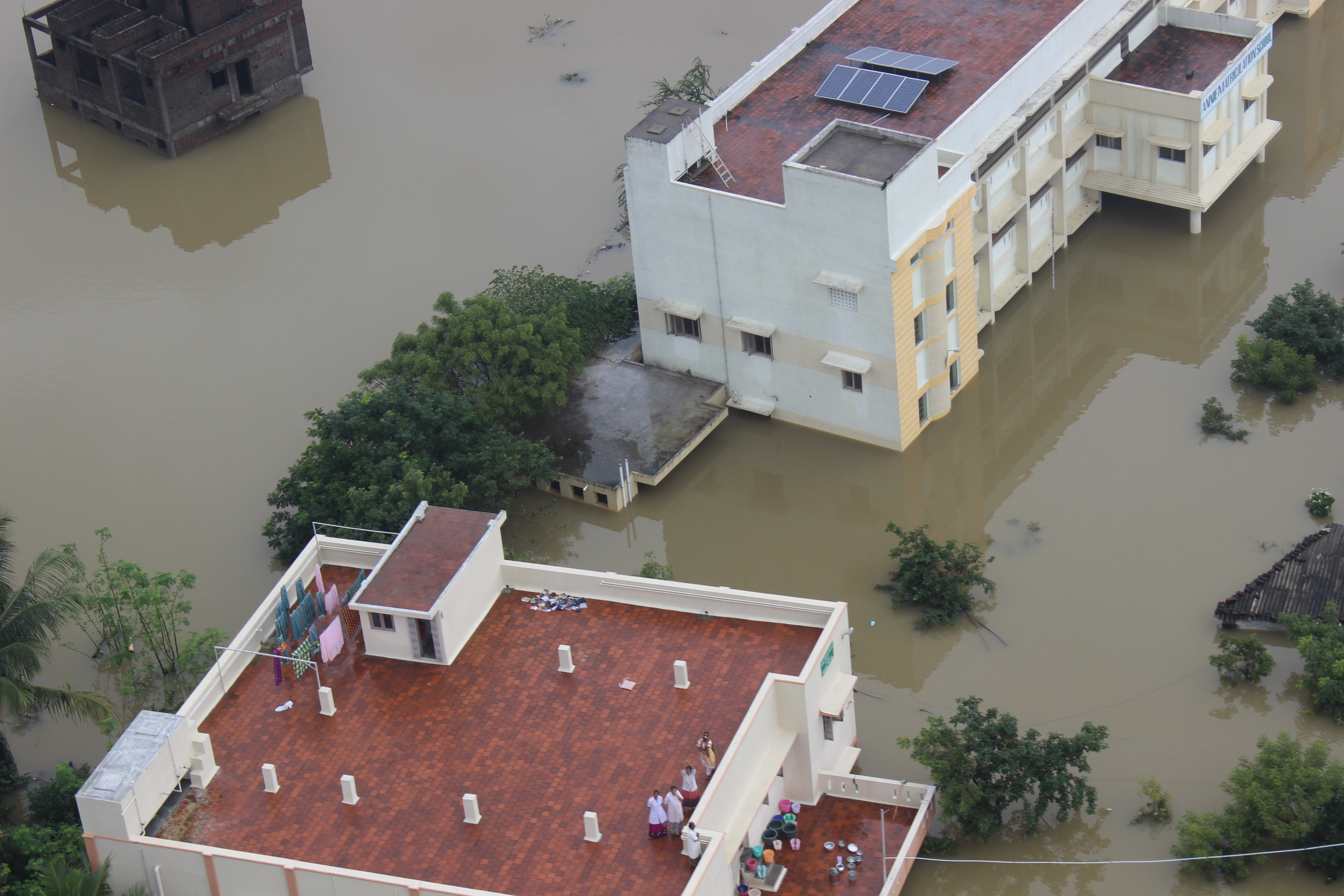
Aerial view of flood-hit areas of Chennai

Though rainfall from the earlier low-pressure system ended on 24 November, another system developed on 29 November, bringing additional rain and the India Meteorological Department predicted heavy rainfall over Tamil Nadu until the end of the week. On 1 December, heavy rains led to inundation in many areas of Chennai. By afternoon, power supplies were suspended to 60% of the city while several city hospitals stopped functioning. The same day, Chief Minister of Tamil Nadu Jayalalithaa announced that, because of the continued flooding and rains, half-yearly school examinations originally scheduled for 7 December would be postponed until the first week in January. For the first time since its founding in 1878, the major newspaper The Hindu did not publish a print edition on 2 December, as workers were unable to reach the press building. The Southern Railways cancelled major train services and Chennai International Airport was closed until 6 December.

Chennai was officially declared a disaster area on the evening of 2 December. At the MIOT Hospital, 14 patients died after power and oxygen supplies failed. With a letup in rainfall, floodwaters gradually began to recede in Chennai on 4 December, though 40 percent of the city's districts remained submerged and safe food and drinking water remained in short supply. Though relief efforts were well underway across most of the area by 3 December, the lack of any coordinated relief response in North Chennai forced thousands of its residents to evacuate on their own. As intermittent rains returned, thousands of displaced residents from Chennai, Kancheepuram and Tiruvallur districts attempted to flee the stricken region by bus or train and travel to their family homes. Chennai International Airport was partly reopened for cargo flights on 5 December, with passenger flights scheduled to resume from the following morning. By 6 December, rescue efforts had largely concluded and relief efforts intensified, with the Chennai Corporation beginning to disburse relief packages. Mobile, banking and power services were gradually restored; fuel and food supplies were reaching their destinations, the airport had fully reopened and rail services slowly resumed. Many city neighbourhoods, however, remained flooded with some lacking basic necessities due to the uncoordinated distribution of relief materials. With the city slowly beginning to recover, state and national health officials remained watchful against disease outbreaks, warning that conditions were right for epidemics of water-borne illnesses to occur. Chennai Corporation officials reported at least 57,000 homes in the city had suffered structural damage, mostly those of working class. State housing boards said they would conduct safety inspections of both public and residential buildings. After being closed for the past month, schools and colleges across the affected districts began to reopen from 14 December. Relief operations were largely wound up by 19 December.

South of Chennai, heavy rains and flooding persisted into the second week of December. In Kancheepuram district, Chengalpattu, kanchipuram, Nandivaram- Guduvanchery, Perungalathur, Tambaram, Mudichur and Anakaputhur were inundated in floodwaters up to 7 metres deep by 5 December, which washed away roads and severed rail links; 98 people from the district were reported to have died. During 4–5 December, parts of Villupuram and Tiruvarur districts received up to 10 centimetres of rain, while some towns in Cuddalore district saw up to nine centimetres. Flood alerts were broadcast to 12 villages in the neighbourhood of the Tirumurthy dam in Tirupur district on 7 December, as the dam was likely to reach capacity within two days; the residents of those villages were urged to evacuate. Due to rainfall in Tirunelveli district, all of its dams had reached or were approaching full capacity by 7 December, forcing local authorities to discharge thousands of cusecs of water from reservoirs and causing the Thamirabarani River to reach flood stage. Torrential rains inundated hundreds of acres of paddy fields in Thanjavur, Tiruvarur and Nagapattinam districts, and caused residential areas to flood by 8 December. Large parts of Thanjavur city were marooned by rising waters, while several houses collapsed under the brunt of rainfall in Kumbakonam and Veppathoor.

After Chennai district, Cuddalore district was among those most severely affected by the flooding. Six of the district's 13 blocks suffered extensive damage during the floods in November. The resumption of heavy rainfall from 1 December again inundated the Cuddalore municipality and the district, displacing tens of thousands of people. Rains continued through 9 December. Despite the state government and individuals sending rescue teams and tonnes of relief materials to the district, thousands of those affected continued to lack basic supplies due to inadequate distribution efforts; this resulted in several relief lorries being stopped and looted by survivors. Large swaths of Cuddalore city and the district remained inundated as of 10 December, with thousands of residents marooned by floodwaters and over 60,000 hectares of farmland inundated; over 30,000 people had been evacuated to relief camps.

The state government reported preliminary flood damages of ₹84.81 billion (US$881 million), and requested ₹20 billion (US$208 million) for immediate relief efforts. On 5 December, a senior state revenue official said the state's official estimates of flood-related losses in November alone exceeded ₹98 billion (US$1 billion); he added the catastrophic flooding thus far in December could escalate total losses to well over ₹1,000 billion (US$10 billion). On 9 December, Chief Minister Jayalalithaa wrote to Prime Minister Modi, requesting him to immediately declare the "unprecedented, catastrophic and cataclysmic" flooding as a "national calamity." Aon Benfield, a major UK-based reinsurance broker, classified the floods as the costliest to have occurred in 2015, and the eight-costliest natural disaster of the year.

On 13 December, the state government requested the central government to release a total of ₹102.50 billion (US$1.53 billion) towards relief and rehabilitation efforts, including ₹50 billion (US$519 million) for a housing project to accommodate 50,000 displaced people, ₹7.5 billion (US$78 million) to rehouse another 50,000 people who had formerly lived in huts destroyed by the floods and ₹45 billion (US$467 million) to rebuild damaged roads, drains, tap water pipes and sewers in urban localities. On 22 December, the government further revised its estimates, requesting ₹174315.1 million (US$2.63 billion) in addition to the ₹84.81 billion previously requested for the flood damage sustained in November, for a total of ₹259125.1 million (US$3.91 billion).

In January 2016, the state government issued a detailed final statement which said 421 people in Tamil Nadu had died of flood-related causes between 28 October, when the first monsoonal rains had arrived in earnest, through 31 December; (Note: Not including 49 people who had died between 1–28 October as a result of the monsoon.) however, relief workers alone had reported hundreds more who were missing, and various police reports had placed the death toll in the Chennai region alone at over 500 as of mid-December. Chennai-area morgues and crematoria were reported to have been "piled up" with bodies as floodwaters began receding in the second week of December, while all of the still-functioning area cemeteries had recorded over three times the usual number of burials, up from a normal 25–30 burials per week. According to the Tamil Nadu government, 3042,000 (3.042 million) families had suffered total or partial damage to their dwellings. 3,8276.8 million hectares of crops had been lost due to flooding, including over 347,000 hectares of agricultural crops and 35,471 hectares of horticultural crops; roughly 98,000 livestock animals and poultry had died. On 25 April 2018, the skeleton of a man reported missing during the floods was discovered in the Chennai neighbourhood of Peerkankaranai near Tambaram, though a definitive identification could not be made immediately.

=== Puducherry ===
Puducherry sustained relatively minor damage in November as the depression largely remained offshore; some trees were downed and several banana and sugarcane plantations at Kuttchipalayam were severely damaged. Puducherry reported receiving 55.7 mm of rainfall over the 24-hour period from 14 to 15 November. Water entered several houses in low-lying areas, while three houses collapsed in Uppalam. Mudaliarpet, parts of Rainbow Nagar, Muthialpet, Krishna Nagar and Lawspet Main Road were inundated, along with portions of roadways near Karuvadikkuppam and the Shivaji statue on the ECR, causing traffic problems. Several roads were badly damaged, hindering motorists, while some members of the public took the initiative to begin clearing areas of water without directions from the government. Chief Minister N Rangasamy stated the official machinery had been readied in preparation for any flooding, while local administration officials closed all schools and colleges in Puducherry and Karaikal districts on 16 November, anticipating further rainfall.

On 24 November, it was reported over 4800 hectares of farmland had been flooded, though it remained too early to determine the extent of crop damage. On 26 November, the union territorial government submitted a preliminary estimate of damages to the central government, requesting it to release an initial ₹1.82 billion (US$19 million) for relief; based on preliminary estimates, Chief Minister Rangasamy reported losses as follows: public works (₹120.89 crore (US$13 million)), municipal administration (₹487 million (US$5 million)), agriculture (₹72 million (US$747,666)), power (₹31.4 million (US$326,065)), revenue (₹24.8 million (US$257,529)) and animal husbandry (₹719,000 (US$7,500)). On 1 December, Rangasamy requested an additional ₹1 billion (US$10 million) for "immediate interim relief". At the start of December, Puducherry reported receiving 83.4 centimetres of rain during November alone, as opposed to a normal average of 76.7 centimetres during the entire north-east monsoonal period from October to December. Since rain-related damage had continued even after the submission of a report on the earlier flooding in November, and also after the recent visit of a central government survey team, on 4 December the Puducherry government said it would submit a supplementary report assessing additional damages and requesting ₹1.5 billion (US$16 million) for a total relief-fund requirement of ₹3.33 billion (US$35 million).

From 1 December, torrential rains again inundated portions of the union territory. Puducherry recorded 22 cm of rainfall over a 24-hour period, making it the wettest December day ever. Heavy rain beginning on the evening of 4 December flooded parts of Puducherry, continuing through the following morning. According to the Regional Meteorological Centre, Chennai, Puducherry received nine centimetres of rain during this period. Puducherry District Collector D.Manikandan, said the rainfall had been "unprecedented in Puducherry, and the volume has been the highest [since] 1975." The administration said that 618 houses had been damaged thus far and over 2,000 people evacuated to safe places. On 5 December, the Karaikal region recorded 110 centimetres of rainfall since the start of the north-east monsoon. In Karaikal, an enclave of Puducherry, nearly 50 houses were damaged due to heavy rain and flooding.

On 5 December, the territorial government announced that nearly 9,000 hectares of paddy fields had been damaged by torrential rainfall, including 4,420 hectares of paddy fields in Puducherry,4,248.34 hectares in Karaikal and 287.15 hectares in Yanam. The government also reported 1,544 hectares of sugarcane fields under cultivation had been damaged, along with 297.73 hectares of plantains, 231.9 hectares of tapioca and related tubers, 168.10 hectares of vegetable fields and eight hectares under betel-leaf cultivation. Proposed compensation rates would be as follows: ₹50,000 (US$519) per hectare for betel-leaf losses, ₹35,000 (US$363) per hectare for plantains, ₹20,000 (US$208) per hectare for paddy fields and ₹15,000 (US$156) per hectare for losses of vegetables, tapioca, tubers and sugercane. Compensation scales had also been set for losses of cotton, lentils and flowers.

G. Sundaramurthy, a 62-year-old man in Ariyankuppam, was killed on 9 November when a mud wall collapsed, while Anandan, a 53-year-old man in Ouppalam, was subsequently reported to have died because of the rain. On 17 November, S. Chellammal, a 72-year-old woman in Karayamputhur, was killed by the collapse of a rain-weakened mud wall.

=== Andhra Pradesh ===
The season began on 9 November, with a Depression hitting Tamil Nadu. Rainfall begin pour in the places of Nellore and Chittoor district. Tirumala getting a heavy rainfall of 309mm along with Tirupathi with 148mm in 24 hours triggered a flood situation in Chittoor District. Coastal places of Tada recorded 114mm of rainfall on the same day. There were 3–4 good spells of rain between 9th and 15th. As rainfall began in Andhra Pradesh on 16 November, local authorities closed schools in Nellore district. Heavy rain of about 27 cm pounded the temple town of Tirupathi. Thousands of lakes and ponds across the district overflowed, with breaches reported in some areas. At Sri Kalahasti, a pilgrimage centre in the region, the Swarnamukhi River was reported to be rising. Three people were swept away by floodwaters in Chittoor district, and water entered some houses. Roads were damaged in many parts of Nellore district, disrupting transport services. Andhra Pradesh chief minister Chandrababu Naidu held a teleconference with the district collectors of affected districts and asked disaster response personnel to be on alert.

Heavy rainfall in Nellore, Chittoor and Kadapa districts flooded villages and disrupted transport networks. It was estimated by 18 November that at least 500 km of roads had been damaged by flooding, with the Chennai–Kolkata highway damaged the previous day and stranding hundreds of vehicles and motorists; officials said it would take days to restore the link. As in Tamil Nadu, the Southern Railway diverted or cancelled numerous trains. Over 10,000 lorry drivers were stranded on the Tada-Kavali national highway in Nellore district; district officers established 61 relief camps in the flood-affected areas and deputed senior IAS officers to oversee the relief operations in Gudur, Naidupet and Atmakur divisions, respectively. Up to 500 tanks were breached as rivers overflowed, forcing the administration to suspend rescue operations in marooned villages, though administrators supplied 10,000 food and water packets through the rail network, which managed to operate some trains, while the APSRTC continued to run bus services to less-flooded areas such as Atmakuru, Udayagiri, Marripadu and Seetharampuram.

In Kadapa district, the rains tapered off by 18 November; preliminary estimates were that the district had sustained about ₹290 million (US$3 million) of agricultural losses. Horticulture farms at Pendlimerry, Chintakommadinne, Siddhavatam and Khajipet mandals were also destroyed by the rain. Other heavy agricultural losses were reported in Rayalaseema, Nellore, Prakasam, East and West Godavari districts; the chief minister asked agriculture department officials to drain fields at the earliest in order to save crops.

In a letter to Prime Minister Narendra Modi on 19 November, Chief Minister Naidu reported preliminary estimates of flood-related damage in Andhra Pradesh included ₹12.5 billion (US$130 million) worth of agricultural-related damages and ₹10.25 billion (US$106 million) of damage to infrastructure; he requested central authorities to release ₹10 billion (US$104 million) for immediate relief efforts. According to Naidu, Nellore district was the most seriously affected, reporting an estimated ₹13.95 billion (US$145 million) worth of losses, followed by Chittoor district, which reported losses of ₹8.18 billion (US$85 million). Kadapa district was also seriously affected, with extensive crop damage reported in East and West Godavari districts and a lesser scale of damage in Anantapur, Prakasam and Krishna districts. The aquaculture industry in Nellore district was catastrophically affected, with over 8000 hectares of fish and prawn ponds destroyed, at an estimated loss of ₹2.5 billion (US$26 million). On 2 December, Thota Narasimham, an MP from the Telugu Desam Party, reported in the Lok Sabha that preliminary losses in the state roughly totalled ₹38.19 billion (US$397 million).

Heavy rains resumed on 2 December, adding to the devastation in Nellore and Chittoor districts, with more rains forecast over the ensuing days; Chittoor district received between 50 and 160 mm of rainfall. Chief Minister Naidu directed district officials and health, water and sanitation officers to organise water purification and set up medical relief camps. On 4 December, Andhra Pradesh Home Minister Nimmakayala Chinarajappa reported heavy infrastructural losses in Nellore and Chittoor districts, with heavy agricultural losses in Godavari district; he added that over 500,000 acres of standing crops had been destroyed, and that the state government had requested ₹37.5 billion (US$389 million) in immediate relief funds from the central government. At the start of December, Chittoor district recorded 65.1 cm of rain over the monsoonal season thus far, as opposed to a normal 16.1 cm of rainfall. 2,429 hectares of crops in the district were damaged, including 1,790 hectares of paddy that had been submerged. A further 3,039 hectares of horticultural crops were also damaged. After a central government survey team completed an assessment of the flood-hit districts on 12 December, the state government submitted a final revised estimate of damages from the November and December floods; the memorandum stated that the flooding had caused ₹49.6 billion (US$515 million) worth of damages and losses.

As of 4 December 81 people were reported to have been killed by flooding in the state, while over 14,000 people had been evacuated to relief camps in Nellore and Chittoor districts.

== Consequences of flooding ==
Supplies of basic necessities, including milk, water, and vegetables, were affected due to logistical difficulties. During the December floods in Chennai and the adjoining areas, milk packets sold for ₹100 (US$1.00), five times more than their usual cost. Water bottles and cans were sold at prices between ₹100 (US$1.00) to ₹150 (US$1.60). Vegetables were sold at ₹6 to ₹10 over and above their normal average cost at the wholesale level.

Apart from basic necessities, fuel supplies, and travel were greatly affected, especially in Chennai. Numerous accounts of price-gouging were reported; airfares to and from for most parts of South India peaked to almost 10 times over their normal price. A round trip fare from Mumbai or New Delhi to Bangalore, Karnataka (the nearest accessible city to Chennai, Tamil Nadu) was sold by airlines like Jet Airways at rates of almost ₹100,000 (US$1,000), a trip which would have ordinarily cost between ₹10,000 (US$100) to ₹20,000 (US$210). Apart from airfares in South India, airfares also increased for other connections within the country, due to disruptions in rail services. In response, the Ministry of Civil Aviation warned companies against taking advantage of the situation to overcharge and that it would intervene if any of the passenger flight carriers did so. On its own, the civil aviation ministry also operated flights from the Rajali naval airbase in Arakonam, Chennai with a fixed price of ₹2,000 (US$21) per passenger for travel to the northern states and ₹1,000 (US$10) per passenger for travel to the southern states.

In Chennai, over 150,000 (150,000) street vendors sustained losses of over ₹3 billion (US$31 million). The persistent rainfall and flooding forced several major automakers in the region, including Ford, Renault, Nissan and Daimler AG, to temporarily halt production, resulting in estimated losses of up to ₹10 billion (US$104 million). Industry analysts estimated total industrial losses as a result of the floods to be in the range of ₹128 billion to ₹150 billion (US$1.52 billion to US$2.27 billion). All of the major auto- and truck-makers in the Oragadam and Sriperumbudur manufacturing belts resumed operations by 8 December, despite ongoing damage assessments; some employees were forced to continue working from their homes. Many major information technology companies, including Infosys and Tata Consultancy Services, closed their offices and had their employees work from their homes, or transferred operations to other locations in cities including Pune and Bengaluru. Prices of vegetables and fruits significantly increased, as over 50% of supplies were affected after numerous lorries were stranded. The Indian Oil Corporation was forced to close its large Manali refinery in Chennai because of the floods. Popular television networks, namely Puthiya Thalaimurai, Jaya TV and Mega TV halted services following flood-related technical difficulties. Motorcycle producer Royal Enfield shut its Chennai offices on 1 December, as well as its plants in Thiruvotriyur and Oragadam, which had already lost the production of 4,000 motorcycles in November. The Chennai real estate market sustained an estimated loss of nearly ₹300 billion (US$3.1 billion), while over 20,000 small and medium industrial units across Tamil Nadu reported total losses of over ₹140 billion (US$1.5 billion).

Insurers in India estimated they would receive claims totalling over ₹10 billion (US$100 million) for losses to property, cargo and inventory, mostly from auto companies. During the first period of floods, claims worth about ₹5 billion (US$52 million) were settled by various general insurance companies in India, largely from shopkeepers and vehicle owners. According to the General Insurance Corporation of India, another large amount of claims was expected to be reported by automobile companies based in South India. The General Insurance giant of India, the New India Assurance alone received claims amounting about ₹4.25 billion (US$44 million) from about 1,700 claims submissions till mid December. By late January 2016, various insurers reported they had received roughly 50,000 damage claims totalling ₹48 billion (US$500 million).

Several Indian IT giants like Tata Consultancy Services and Wipro also informed their stakeholders about an expected material impact on its third-quarter earnings due to the floods and then to the low volume revenue during Christmas and New Year holidays in the west. Car makers were also hugely affected due to shut down of plants, thus leading to lower production volume. German automaker BMW expected to resume production only from January 2016 while the American automaker Ford started its plant only in late December 2015. The estimated production loss cost of BMW was about ₹2.5 billion (US$26 million) and Ford's was about ₹6 billion (US$62 million).

== Relief efforts ==
=== Tamil Nadu ===
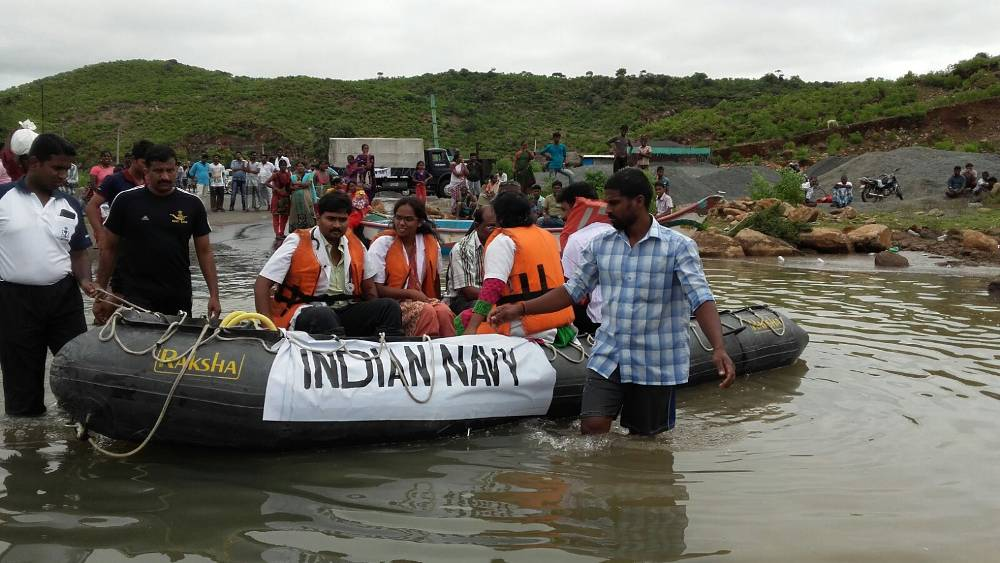
Relief efforts by the Indian Navy in Chennai

Tamil Nadu Chief Minister Jayalalithaa announced an initial allocation of ₹5 billion (US$52 million) for relief and rehousing, with ₹400,000 (US$4,200) for each family who had lost relatives in the floods. 12 cyclone shelters were built in Nagapattinam district, while 11 teams of the National Disaster Response Force (NDRF) were dispatched to Tamil Nadu. Over 10,000 people had been rescued by 14 to 27 November and dozens of relief camps established . The Indian Air Force deployed four helicopters to airlift flood victims from inundated parts of Chennai city. Over 5,300 people had been rescued by 16 November and dozens of relief camps established. Political parties in Tamil Nadu demanded swift action and the allocation of central government relief funds. Opposition party Dravida Munnetra Kazhagam (DMK) donated ₹10 million (US$103,843) to the state government on behalf of the party. DMK leader Karunanidhi however criticised the government's disbursement of ₹5 billion (US$52 million) as insufficient considering the amount of damage resulting from the floods. He and local Communist Party of India state secretary R Mutharasan urged efforts to obtain large amounts of federal disaster relief funding; Karunanidhi further suggested soliciting funds "from the rich in Tamil Nadu for disaster relief and the establishment of party monitoring committees to ensure a speedy disbursal of relief without any discrimination". Anbumani Ramadoss, Lok Sabha MP from the Pattali Makkal Katchi demanded an immediate ₹5,000 (US$52) be disbursed to families that had lost their livelihoods because of the flooding.

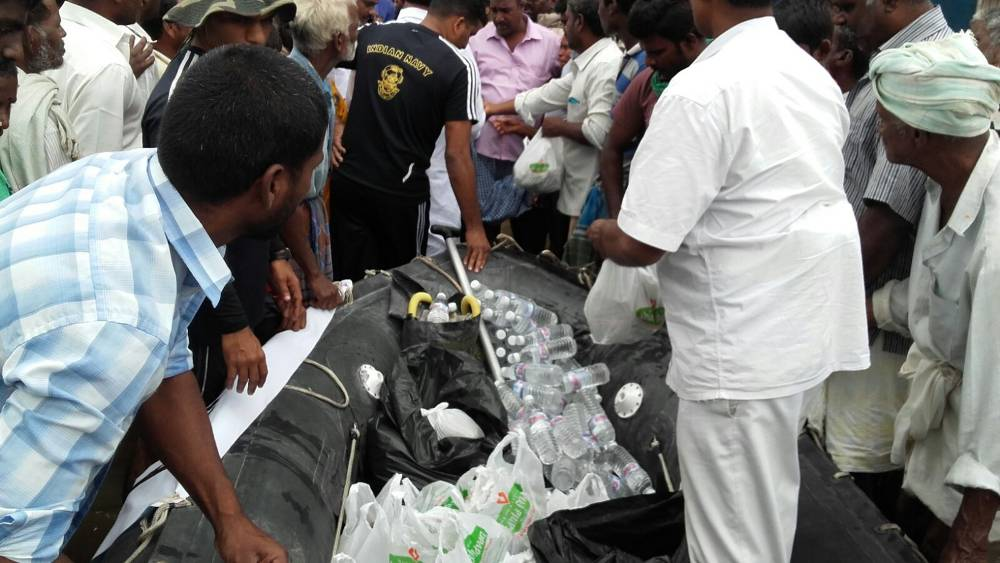
Indian Navy officers distribute drinking water in Chennai.

The Indian Coast Guard and the three other branches of the Indian Armed Forces conducted rescue operations across Tamil Nadu, with the Indian Army and Air Force rescuing people in Kancheepuram district. The IAF conducted 25 sorties in Tamil Nadu and in Andhra Pradesh, air-dropping 5000 kg of supplies and rescuing 25 stranded people before ceasing operations on 20 November. Uninterrupted power supply had been restored in 671 of the 683 village panchayats in Cuddalore district, with the remaining panchayats supplied with drinking water through tanker lorries. 40 medical camps and 121 special camps for cattle stock had been constructed and 70 relief camps had distributed 58,000 food packets. Upwards of 5,335 people living in low-lying areas had been evacuated and over 90,000 food packets distributed in 101 relief camps. In Tiruvallur district, 18,501 food packets were distributed through 57 relief camps and 2,958 people had been given shelter. In Kancheepuram district, people in low-lying areas had been moved to safety and 16,000 food packets distributed. It was reported on 18 November that 55,000 people across Tamil Nadu had been screened for water- and vector-borne diseases in medical camps, while a further 402 mobile medical units were operating. On 22 November, the central government released an initial ₹9,396 million (US$98 million) for immediate relief efforts in the state, sanctioning a further ₹10 billion (US$104 million) on 3 December. Over 1.1 million (1,100,000) people were rescued in the Chennai region by the time rainfall ceased.

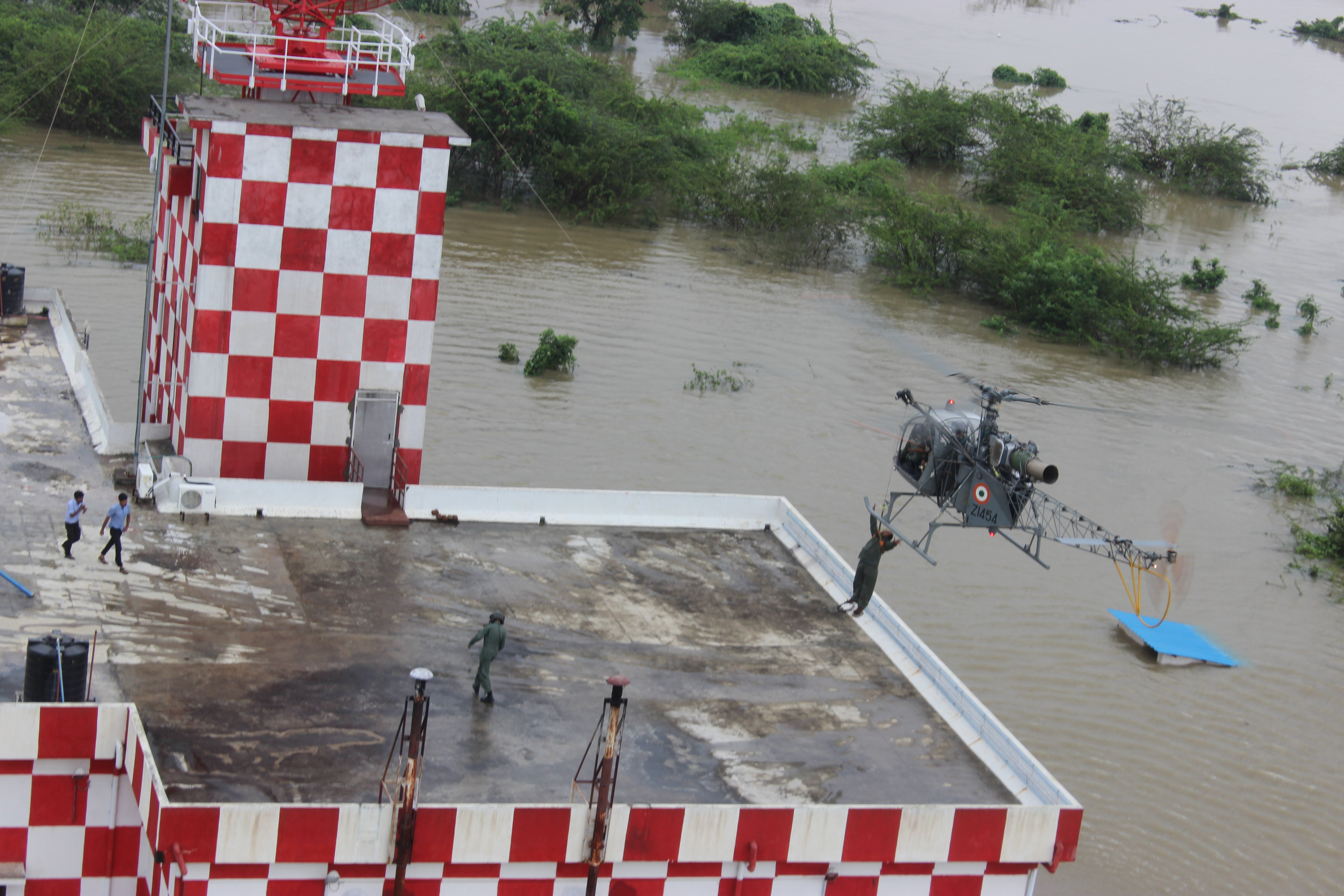
Indian Air Force Cheetah helicopters carrying out winching operations to rescue stranded people in Chennai and its suburbs

With the return of flooding and rains on 30 November, Prime Minister of India Narendra Modi assured all possible help to Tamil Nadu on 1 December. The NDRF, the Coast Guard and the three other branches of the Indian Armed Forces resumed the evacuation of stranded people. In Chennai, the Chennai Corporation established 80 relief centres to accommodate around 10,845 people. The Chennai City Police mobilised over 10,000 police officers and trained swimmers, deploying drones across the city to locate upwards of 200 people, who were all rescued. The NDRF had deployed 22 rescue teams to Tamil Nadu by the night of 2 December, and had rescued over 500 people. By the evening of 2 December, over 4,500 people had been evacuated to 24 relief camps in Chennai district, with a further 23,000 people in 99 relief camps in Kancheepuram district and nearly 2,000 others in 25 camps in Tiruvallur district. By the afternoon of 3 December, the NDRF said it had rescued over 5,000 people; 11 army columns were in position by the evening. Over 1,500 stranded passengers were evacuated from Chennai International by the evening of 2 December. By 4 December, the IAF had established air bridges from Meenambakkam Airport to Arakonnam and between Arakonnam and Tambaram Air Base, nearly 30 km from Chennai; it had rescued over 200 people from both locations. The NDRF deployed over 20 more teams in the Chennai area, and had rescued over 10,000 people in all by the afternoon. In Kancheepuram district, over 55,000 people had taken refuge in 237 relief camps by 5 December.

The Indian Navy orchestrated a disaster relief operation under the command of Rear Admiral Alok Bhatnagar, the Flag Officer Commanding Tamil Nadu, Puducherry Naval Area (TNNA). The Eastern Naval Command of the Indian Navy rushed an amphibious warfare vessel, the INS Airavat, to Chennai on 2 December, with a complement of 20 divers, five Gemini boats, four landing craft and two boats. Three naval flood relief teams, comprising 86 trained swimmers and divers and three officers, were rushed to Tamil Nadu, along with several hundred food packets. The INS Rajali naval air station at Arakkonam functioned as a makeshift airport for transporting relief materials and evacuating stranded people. On 3 December, the Eastern Naval Command despatched the fleet tanker INS Shakti and the stealth guided missile frigate INS Sahyadri to Tamil Nadu; the ships brought 105 additional divers, 200 tents, 3000 towels, 1000 blankets, 10 field kitchens and food, milk powder, medicines, 5000 litres of bottled water and 700 tonnes of fresh water. General Dalbir Singh Suhag, the Chief of the Army Staff, flew to Chennai on 4 December to supervise the Army's rescue efforts; he and the General Officer Commanding, Dakshin Bharat Area, conducted an aerial reconnaissance. An additional 15 NDRF teams were planned to arrive in a day or two. With rainfall gradually becoming less intense, the pace of relief efforts intensified by 5 December. By then, more than 1.1 million (1,100,000) people had been evacuated to safer places and thousands more temporarily housed in relief camps across the city and adjoining districts. People in many localities began draining stagnant water, while government relief efforts were supplemented by thousands of NGO volunteers and individuals with food packets, drinking water, clothes, blankets and medicines. 92 mobile medical teams were deployed across Chennai on 4 December to tend to the needy, while 200 special medical camps became operational on 5 December, in addition to more than 210 camps already operating. Indian physician Edmond Fernandes lead a post disaster epidemiological research which found 87.9% depressed due to flooding and also provided a policy analysis to integrate work between the city corporation, public work department, slum clearance board, housing boards and development authority in-order to respond efficiently.

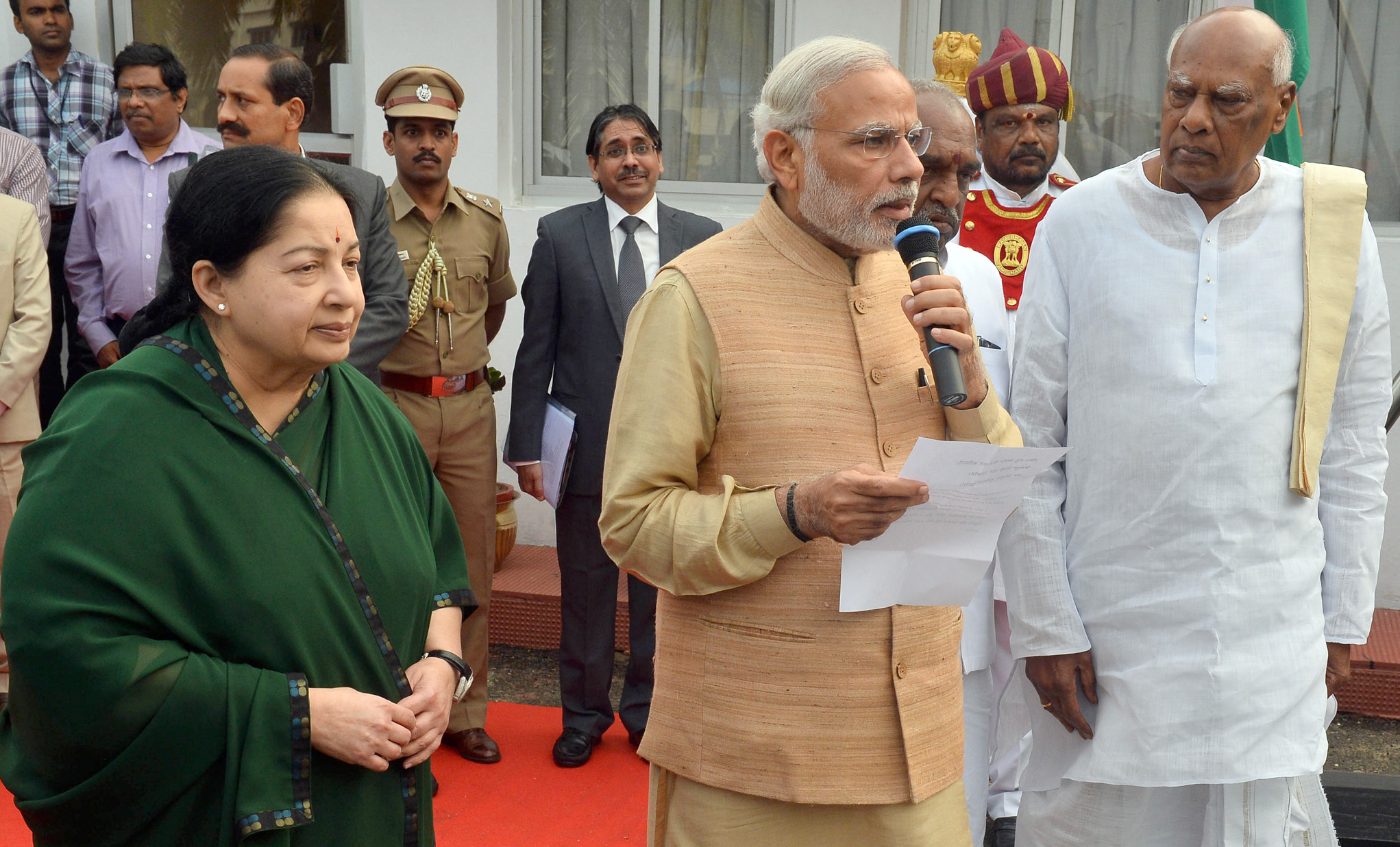
Prime Minister Modi along with Chief Minister Jayalalitha announces relief measures in Chennai

Ravi Shankar Prasad, the Union Minister of Telecommunications said BSNL would provide free services through the week. The National Crisis Management Committee (NCMC), chaired by Cabinet Secretary P.K. Sinha, sent 5000 litres of milk, 100,000 bottles of water, 7 tonnes of biscuits and 10 tonnes of instant noodles to Tamil Nadu on 4 December; the committee also decided to augment the nine army columns (roughly 675 troops, or 75 per column) operating in the state with an additional five columns (roughly 375 troops). In Madurai district, state officials distributed ₹1,393,000 (US$14,000) to 412 people whose houses had been partly or completely damaged because of flooding; 111 people in the first category each received ₹5,000 (US$52), while each of the others received ₹4,100 (US$43). Nine shipments of bedding, carpets, biscuits, rice and fresh water packets totalling ₹35 million (US$363,449) were despatched by lorry to Tiruvallur district on 5 December by state Environment Minister Thoppu N Venkatachalam. On 4 December, the Coimbatore City Corporation sent ₹500,000 (US$5,200) of relief supplies to Chennai, including 2,000 blankets, 1,000 towels, 2,000 baby napkins, 2,000 sanitary napkins, 4,000 candles, 2,000 matches, 21,000 biscuit packets, 6,000 health drink bottles, 6,000 toothpaste and brush sets and a few other items. The corporation also sent 165 men, including 150 conservancy workers, in buses and lorries with equipment to carry out relief operations. In Kanyakumari district, residents had by 8 December contributed ₹2,211,000 (US$23,000) to the Chief Minister's Relief Fund along with ₹3.5 million (US$36,345) worth of relief materials; two shipments of relief materials had been sent to Kanchipuram and Cuddalore districts.

As of 10 December, the Tamil Nadu state government said roughly 1,716,000 (1716,000) people had been temporarily housed in 6,605 flood relief camps erected across the state, most of which were in Chennai, Cuddalore, Thiruvallur and Kanchipuram districts; 600 boats had been mobilised, roughly 12,294,470 (12 million) food packets distributed, 26,270 medical camps conducted and 2,565,000 (2565,000) persons treated in those camps. In addition, up to 49,329 people had been screened through 222 medical camps and 97 mobile medical units on 9 December alone. An immediate relief of ₹675 million (US$7 million) had been disbursed to 111,278 families, and a total of 80,120 people belonging to the army, navy, air force, NDRF, fire service, Coast Guard, police and other official groups had been involved in rescue efforts in the state. The Chennai Corporation, which began distributing relief materials in the city from 6 December, reported it had received nearly 1.3 million (1.3 million) of relief materials to that point, including 58,156 bedsheets, 702,000 water packets, 33,000 packets of powdered milk, 52,000 packets of bread, 16,000 bags of rice, 56,000 packets of biscuits, 3500 mats and 2200 saris and dhotis. In Chennai city, over 100,000 (100,000) tonnes of flood debris and sludge was slowly being cleared away, while stagnant water had been pumped from 787 of 859 waterlogged neighbourhoods. Relief operations in Chennai were largely concluded by 19 December, by which time 12.8 million (12.8 million) food packets had been distributed, 186,000 (186,000) tonnes of garbage collected and 1679,000 (1.679 million) people screened at 10,833 medical camps.

On 5 December, Prime Minister Modi announced ex gratia payments of ₹200,000 (US$2,100) to the next of kin of those who had lost their lives in the floods, and ₹50,000 (US$519) each to those seriously injured. On 7 December, the Tamil Nadu state government announced a comprehensive relief package for those affected by the floods. According to a statement made by Chief Minister Jayalalithaa, people living in huts who had lost them in the floods would be compensated with a permanent house, ₹10,000 (US$104), 10 kilos of rice, a sari and a dhoti; those affected by flooding and who lived in substantial houses would receive the same clothes and amount of rice along with ₹5,000 (US$52) in compensation. 10,000 permanent houses would be allotted in Chennai and new houses constructed for those previously in huts. The relief assistance would be deposited in the bank accounts of beneficiaries, while aid-in-kind, including rice, dhotis and saris would be distributed through PDS outlets, said Jayalalithaa; she further stated that she had ordered an immediate enumeration of affected families, and that the aid would be disbursed in a few days after a listing was complete. For those living along the banks of the Adyar, Cooum River and the Buckingham Canal and who had lost homes, the Chief Minister ordered an immediate allocation of 10,000 tenements in Okkiyam Thoraipakkam and Perumbakkam, which had been built by the Tamil Nadu Slum Clearance Board. Livestock losses would be compensated with ₹10,000 (US$104) (for losses of cows and buffaloes) and ₹3,000 (US$31) (for losses of goats and pigs); poultry would be compensated at a rate of ₹100 (US$1). Agricultural damage would be compensated at a rate of ₹13,500 (US$140) per hectare if 33 percent or more of paddy crops had been lost, and at a rate of ₹18,000 (US$187) per hectare for long-term (perennial) crops. Finally, special camps for two weeks, beginning from 14 December would be held to issue duplicate land title deeds, educational certificates, cooking gas connection cards, voter identity and Aadhaar cards and bank passbooks, all free of cost.

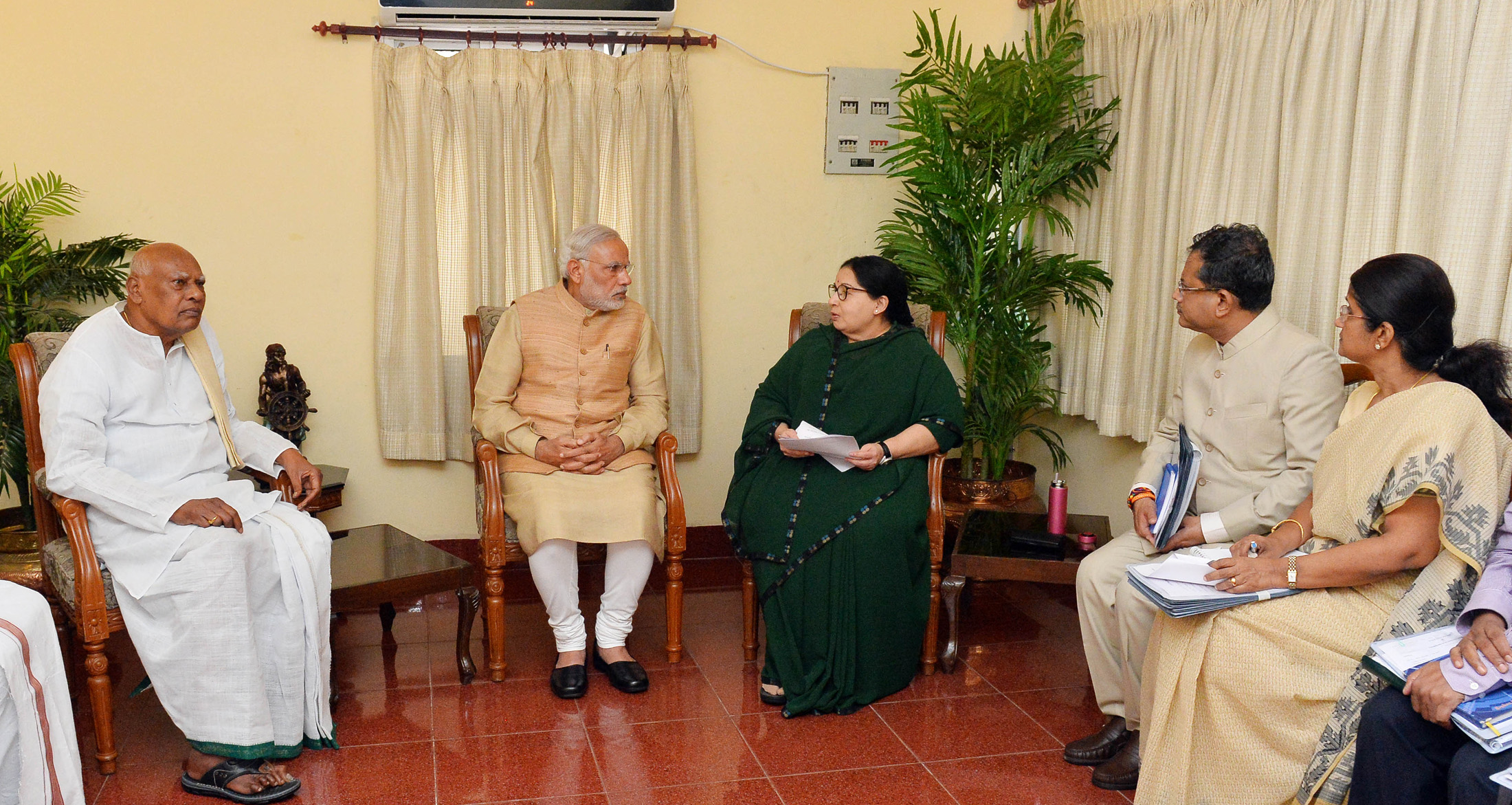
Prime Minister Modi reviews the flood situation with Chief Minister Jayalalithaa

In addition, on 9 December Chief Minister Jayalalithaa requested Modi to develop a credit and soft loan programme through the Finance Ministry to aid families who had lost personal belongings and household appliances; this was as the state's existing compensation plan was inadequate for effectively compensating affected people for those losses. It was reported by The Hindu that an average flood-affected person would require a minimum of ₹30,000 (US$312) to be adequately compensated for losses. As of February 2016, the Chief Minister's Public Relief Fund had received a total of ₹3.39 billion (US$35 million) in donations.

=== Andhra Pradesh ===
In Andhra Pradesh, the state government announced an initial ex gratia payment of ₹500,000 (US$5,200) to the relatives of flood victims, while 140 relief camps were established in Nellore district, the worst affected. ₹20 million (US$207,685) of relief supplies were distributed to fishermen, weavers and local communities in the district; other organisations helped to distribute food packets and blankets. On 24 November, the central government stated it had released an initial ₹10.3 billion (US$107 million) towards relief efforts, with further funds possible following an assessment. In Chittoor district, 8,455 affected households were given a total of ₹42.9 million (US$450,000) in compensation, while 10,797 people were sheltering in rehabilitation camps. ₹4,714,000 (US$49,000) was sanctioned to compensate for livestock and poultry losses. On 3 December, Chief Minister Chandrababu Naidu offered support to Tamil Nadu, which had likewise been severely affected by the floods.

=== Puducherry ===
During the floods in December, the administration in Puducherry evacuated over 1,000 people to relief centres and distributed over 200,000 food packets to affected citizens. The NDRF deployed two teams in Puducherry; several voluntary organisations launched relief efforts, distributing blankets, food and water.

On 5 December, district collector Manikandan said 173 relief centres had been opened in Puducherry and that those evacuated from low-lying areas had been moved to 22 relief centres. They were given food thrice a day, with children given milk; blankets were also provided. In the past week, 525,475 food packets had been distributed. Special medical camps were conducted and medicines and sanitary napkins were distributed. The administration opened 66 relief centres in Karaikal to accommodate rain affected persons.

On 4 December, Chief Minister Rangasamy said the union territorial administration would immediately disburse ₹1.5 billion (US$16 million) in relief to farmers, hut-dwellers, homeowners and cattle owners in the Puducherry, Karaikal and Yanam regions. He expressed pain at witnessing the "unprecedented havoc the rains had caused in Puducherry and Karaikal regions during the last twenty days, damaging standing crops, horticultural crops and also [damaging] houses and huts, besides cattle owners". The administration further decided to provide financial relief of ₹1.24 billion (US$13 million) to 310,000 families covered under the public distribution system (PDS), or ₹4,000 (US$42) to each family. "All families holding ration cards would be handed relief, and each of 310,000 families would be handed ₹4,000 (US$42)" and it would cost more to the exchequer the Honorable Chief Minister Rangasamy said. On 11 December, the Chief Minister gave ₹400,000 (US$4,200) to each of the families of the victims.

On 18 April 2016, the central government approved ₹351 million (US$4 million) of additional financial assistance for Puducherry.

== Response ==
=== National ===
Coverage of the flooding in national media outlets was muted, leading to widespread anger on social media.

President Pranab Mukherjee said he was "saddened by the loss of human lives and serious damage to infrastructure in Chennai", stating his "prayers and good wishes are with the people of Tamil Nadu during this difficult time". On 2 December, Prime Minister Narendra Modi discussed the ongoing flood situation with Home Minister Rajnath Singh and Finance Minister Arun Jaitley. In the Lok Sabha, Parliamentary Affairs Minister M Venkaiah Naidu said that Singh would chair a high-level meeting to deliver relief to the people of Tamil Nadu. He said the ministers were "trying to coordinate with various agencies on relief operations", and that he had alerted the Civil Aviation Ministry to send food to the relief camps. "Since the runway[s] [are] full of water, we have to send food and other basic amenities to the people stranded [at Chennai airport]", Naidu said, adding that he was moved by the "plight of ordinary people [in Tamil Nadu]". He concluded that it was "time for Parliament to convey to [the] people that [they should] be confident". As the extent of the disaster became clear, the Prime Minister flew to Chennai on the afternoon of 3 December to personally review the relief efforts; he met with Chief Minister Jayalalithaa and conducted an aerial survey of flood-stricken areas in the city. In a brief statement which he began in Tamil, upon arriving at Adyar naval base, Modi expressed support and later tweeted "The Government of India stands shoulder to shoulder with the people of Tamil Nadu in this hour of need."

On 18 November, Amit Shah, the national president of the Bharatiya Janata Party, stated the party would donate ₹10 million (US$103,843) towards flood-relief efforts in Tamil Nadu and also established a three-person commission to visit the state and report on the progress of the relief efforts with the delegation headed by Union minister Nirmala Sitharaman, accompanied by Union minister Pon Radhakrishnan and MP Gopal Chinayya Shetty. Sonia Gandhi, the president of the Indian National Congress expressed her distress urging central and state government authorities to spare no effort in their relief works, and that Congress party workers were prepared to aid in the crisis. On 2 December, Rahul Gandhi, vice-president of the INC, expressed his concern via Twitter, stating his thoughts were with the people of Tamil Nadu, and urging Congress party workers in the affected regions to "extend all possible assistance".

Rajya Sabha and Lok Sabha members made urgent requests for all possible assistance on behalf of the flood-stricken areas. T G Venkatesh Babu, Lok Sabha MP from the AIADMK, thanked the central government and Modi for their efforts and requested further aid for Tamil Nadu from the National Disaster Response Fund; he insisted the flood situation in the state should be declared a "national calamity". In the Rajya Sabha on 2 December, leaders of major parties from both sides of the house, including the INC and the Communist Party of India (Marxist), agreed to donate funds from the Member of Parliament Local Area Development Scheme (MPLADS); the specific amount was to be decided upon. On 3 December, Home Minister Rajnath Singh stated in Parliament that the flood situation was "alarming", and that Chennai had "turned into an island". Singh reiterated the central government would provide all necessary assistance to Tamil Nadu.

The Karnataka state government announced on 2 December that it would donate ₹50 million (US$519,213) in relief funds to Tamil Nadu, and said it was also ready to donate 100 tonnes of powdered milk worth ₹15 million (US$155,764). Chief Minister of Odisha Naveen Patnaik expressed his concern over the flooding in Tamil Nadu to his counterpart Jayalalithaa; on 4 December, the Odisha state government donated ₹50 million (US$519,213) to Tamil Nadu. In a letter to Jayalalithaa, Chief Minister of Delhi Arvind Kejriwal said he was "deeply saddened to learn about the havoc [caused] by incessant rains in Chennai and other parts of Tamil Nadu" and conveyed "deepest sympathies for the loss of life and property ... on behalf of the people of Delhi", and pledged "fullest support and all resources at my disposal towards any cooperation required". On 3 December, the Bihar state government announced it would donate a further ₹50 million (US$519,213) to Tamil Nadu. Chief Minister of Bihar Nitish Kumar attributed the heavy flooding in Tamil Nadu to the effects of climate change and expressed concern: "Where earlier there used to be less rain, it is now witnessing excessive rain, we all are bothered about this ... [the feelings of] the people of Bihar are with [the] citizens of Tamil Nadu in this hour of crisis." His deputy, Tejashwi Yadav, said he would donate his first month's salary to victims of the flooding in Tamil Nadu, and encouraged local legislators to likewise donate generously.

The Kerala state government said it would send 10,000 kilos of disinfecting bleach and 10,000 pairs of medical gloves to Tamil Nadu, at the request of its government; it had earlier sent 1.5 lakh charities to the state. The state government added it was further prepared to rush medical teams and medicines to Tamil Nadu if requested. Haryana contributed ₹10 million (US$103,843) to Tamil Nadu from its disaster relief fund; Chief Minister Manohar Lal Khattar said the state would also donate ₹2.1 million (US$21,807) worth of blankets and bedding, and urged Haryana citizens to donate funds to Tamil Nadu through the state relief fund. Chief Minister of Maharashtra Devendra Fadnavis said on 3 December that Maharashtra would extend its complete support to Tamil Nadu in regards to the floods ravaging the state. "We stand with the people of Tamil Nadu during [this] time of [its] worst floods, one of the worst times ever [for the state]", Fadnavis said. On 8 December, Gujarat said it would also donate ₹50 million (US$519,213) in relief funds to Tamil Nadu; via Twitter, Chief Minister Anandiben Patel said the "devastation caused by [the] incessant rains in Tamil Nadu has grieved the entire nation. Gujarat firmly stands with the people of Tamil Nadu during these testing times." On 10 December, the Andhra Pradesh government sanctioned a donation of ₹100 million (US$1 million) towards flood relief in Tamil Nadu; the Tripura state government donated ₹10 million (US$103,843) towards flood relief on 15 December.

=== International ===
On 30 November, the International Federation of Red Cross and Red Crescent Societies (IFRC) released 295,550 CHF (₹20.3805 million (US$211,636)) through the Indian Red Cross to assist 17,500 of those affected by the floods with disease prevention and relief efforts. It subsequently announced it would expand its relief efforts to cover an additional 20,000 people in Tamil Nadu and Andhra Pradesh.

- Bangladesh – The government of Bangladesh expressed firm solidarity with India. In a letter to Prime Minister Narendra Modi, Prime Minister Sheikh Hasina offered her condolences. "We pray for the salvation and eternal peace of the departed souls. As a close friend and neighbour, we stand firmly by you at this difficult hour", Hasina said.
- Canada – The Canadian government and the Canadian Red Cross contributed towards relief efforts.
- China – Premier Li Keqiang forwarded a message of consolation to Prime Minister Modi, and expressed condolences to flood survivors and to the families of those killed in the floods. In a message to External Affairs Minister Sushma Swaraj, Chinese Foreign Minister Wang Yi also expressed his condolences, saying, "It is a friendly tradition for the governments and peoples of China and India to help each other when disaster falls. [The] Chinese people feel the suffering of the Indian people and stand together with them. We believe the disaster-affected people will be able to overcome the difficulties and get back to normal life soon." The Chinese embassy in India contributed ₹500,000 (US$5,200) towards relief efforts, while the Chinese Red Cross contributed a further ₹3,349,000 (US$35,000).
- France – While presiding over the 2015 United Nations Climate Change Conference in Paris, Foreign Minister Laurent Fabius issued a statement: "Flooding in India's Chennai region has taken a tragic toll. I want to express France's solidarity with all those affected by this tragedy. The unprecedented magnitude of the flooding confirms yet again that we no longer have time. We must take concrete and urgent action against climate disruption."
- Iran – Iran's Red Crescent Society (IRCS) voiced readiness to assist with relief and rescue operations in the flood-stricken regions. Ali Asghar Ahmadi, the Director General of the IRCS, extended condolences to India over the deadly floods in Chennai. He said Iran was prepared to dispatch relief and rescue teams to the affected areas at the request of Indian officials, and that the IRCS was ready to send shipments of relief supplies, including food, tents and heaters.
- Japan – On 11 December, during an official visit, Prime Minister Shinzo Abe conveyed his condolences and support to the flood victims in Chennai.
- Malaysia – The Malaysian Ministry of Foreign Affairs said the Malaysian Government expressed its condolences and sympathies to the Indian Government and its people, especially to those affected by the floods. Malaysia I-Medik India Chapter had opened a natural disaster fund to all Malaysians. Through their I-Medik organisation volunteer, funds were distributed to flood victims in Chennai. Most of the volunteers who went during relief distribution are Malaysian students who are studying at Saveetha Dental College and Sri Ramachandra Dental College.
- Maldives – In a message to Prime Minister Narendra Modi, President Abdulla Yameen said he was deeply saddened to learn of the severe flooding. "I wish the recovery efforts every success, and commend the tenacity of the people of India during this challenging time", Yameen said. "Please also convey our sincere condolences to the members of the bereaved families, and our solidarity with the residents of the hardest hit regions."
- Mauritius – During a state visit to India, President Ameenah Gurib-Fakim conveyed her condolences to those suffering from the flooding in Chennai.
- Mexico – The Mexican government released a statement through the Secretariat of Foreign Affairs expressing its condolences. "The Government of Mexico, through the Secretariat of Foreign Affairs (SRE), expresses its condolences and its solidarity with the Government and the people of the Republic of India over the lamentable loss of human lives following the floods registered this week in the city of Chennai, the regional capital of the southeastern state of Tamil Nadu, and in the adjoining districts."
- Nepal –The Nepalese government expressed its sympathy and solidarity with the Indian people and its government. In a statement, the Nepalese Ministry of Foreign Affairs said, "The Government of Nepal is profoundly grieved over the loss of lives and property caused by the recent floods in Chennai, Tamil Nadu, India, and expresses deepest condolences and sympathy to the bereaved families. Its thoughts are with those who are still suffering extreme difficulties in their day-to-day life."
- Singapore – The government of Singapore said it would contribute S$104,835 (₹50.2341 lakh (US$52,164)) through the Singapore Red Cross towards flood relief in Tamil Nadu. In a letter to Tamil Nadu Chief Minister Jayalalithaa, Minister of Foreign Affairs Dr. Vivian Balakrishnan said he was "saddened by the hundreds of lives lost and disrupted due to the severe flooding in Chennai and other parts of Tamil Nadu. Like many Singaporeans, I hope that the floods will recede soon. I am confident that normalcy will return to your state in the near future under your leadership", he wrote. Balakrishnan added that he hoped Singapore's contributions would "be of some assistance to those affected by the floods and demonstrate Singapore's solidarity with the people of Tamil Nadu during this difficult period." Stating it would donate a further S$209,670 (₹10 million (US$103,843)), the Singapore Red Cross also launched a public appeal for donations and placed a team of volunteers on standby to travel to India; SRC Secretary General and CEO Benjamin William said, "We are closely monitoring the flood situation, and remain in close contact with our counterparts, the Indian Red Cross Society and the International Federation of Red Cross and Red Crescent Societies (IFRC), to explore how we can further support the relief efforts."
- Spain – The Spanish Ministry of Foreign Affairs and Cooperation issued a statement expressing its deepest condolences and solidarity with those killed or displaced by the floods. "Spain is dismayed by the news of the floods that are affecting the state of Tamil Nadu in the south-east of India, with dramatic consequences of deaths, missing persons and serious damage to infrastructure. The Government of Spain sends to those affected, and to the people and the authorities of India, its profound condolences for the loss of human lives and sentiments of solidarity and closeness to all of those affected by this terrible catastrophe."
- Sri Lanka – President Maithripala Sirisena expressed his "deepest condolences" to the people affected by the floods in Chennai. "My heart goes out to our neighbours in Chennai as they make it through this difficult time", Sirisena said in a Twitter message.
- United States – United States Department of State Deputy Spokesman Mark Toner said, "The US stands ready to assist the people of Chennai, Tamil Nadu, as well as the Government of India as they face the worst flooding in decades. We express our deepest condolences to the families of the people who have perished in these floods, and our thoughts are with those families who are still trapped and whose livelihoods are affected", Toner said. "The US is in touch with the Government of India to discuss ways that we can provide any assistance at this difficult time. Certainly, India is a very developed government with its own domestic services or capabilities to provide emergency assistance. That said, it's something we normally do especially in the cases of strong partners like India, where we offer whatever assistance we can in the aftermath of natural disasters." He advised US citizens to divert all travel to the affected areas, while those in the region were advised to shelter in place and monitor updates from the US consulate general.
- Vatican – At his Sunday Mass on 20 December, Pope Francis prayed for the flood victims and led prayers for those affected, saying "My thoughts turn in this moment to the dear populations of India, recently stricken by a great flood. Let us pray for these brothers and sisters, who are suffering as a result of this great calamity, and let us entrust the souls of the dead to the mercy of God."

=== Religious and spiritual ===
The Dalai Lama, who had recently visited Chennai, expressed sadness at the unprecedented destruction and the disruption of normal life, and expressed his sympathy with the thousands of people displaced by the flooding in Tamil Nadu. In a letter to Tamil Nadu Chief Minister Jayalalithaa on 4 December, he said, "Chennai was one of the Indian cities I visited when I first came to India in 1956 for the Buddha Jayanthi celebrations. Over the years I have visited this beautiful city several times, most recently three weeks ago as these rains began." He said he was directing the Dalai Lama Trust to make a donation of ₹1.5 million (US$15,576) towards ongoing relief and rescue operations, as a token of his concern for those who had suffered from the catastrophe.

The Sri Ramakrishna Math, Chennai and Ramakrishna Mission expressed their solidarity and did relief work across Chennai, distributing food and clothes, building and renovating homes to the needy; providing flood relief for leprosy afflicted people, and sanitising flood areas.

The Muslim community stepped up holistically to perform relief works. Mosques around the affected parts of the city were opened for camping and shelter. The community also cleaned temples, burying all religious distinctions.

The Catholic Church, through the aid arm of the Catholic Bishops' Conference of India, Caritas India, sent ₹2.5 million (US$25,961) to Tamil Nadu. Amrit Sangma, Caritas India communication officer, said the organisation would provide food, wash kits and clothes to affected people with the support of four local partners. "Based on [our] general understanding in such situations, our effort will be to bring these basic support[s] to [the] neediest families who may be sheltered in school buildings and other government managed camps", Executive Director Fr. Frederick D’Souza said. Relief work was initially intended to be mostly concentrated in the three districts of Kanchipuram, Villupuram and Thiruvallur, with efforts to widen following further assessments.

=== Individuals and organisations ===
Despite criticism of the Tamil Nadu government's mishandling of the crisis, many notable personalities and other people helped those affected by floods. In Chennai, people across the city offered aid, shelter and food through social media channels like Twitter, WhatsApp, and Facebook. Social media sites were also used extensively to relay information about flooded areas, rescue agencies and food and relief centers. Chennai residents set up a temporary website to crowd source information about people needing help and about those who were ready to help. Celebrities such as RJ Balaji, actor Siddharth and Chinmayi actively participated in the relief process by using social media to co-ordinate aid and gather information. Union Minister Venkaiah Naidu visited and distributed relief materials to the flood victims at Tambaram.

A pilot of the Crisis Response Volunteers (CRV) program was kicked of by the State Disaster Management Agency. Disaster management experts from Survival Instincts organized Chennai into grids that are capable of response, rescue and relief operations, independently. College students and corporate members were scheduled into a training regimen that consisted of survival skills, aquatic rescue, emergency medical response, relief warehousing, and essential-material transportation.

Skype announced that it would offer free international calls to landlines and mobiles in Tamil Nadu for "the next few days", starting 3 December 2015. Facebook activated its "safety check" feature to allow Chennai residents to let friends know they were safe, while Google posted a link on its homepage called "Resources for the Chennai Floods", providing details about relief camps and updates on the situation in the city; it also enabled its Crisis Response tool. Several Twitter hashtags including #ChennaiFloods, #ChennaiRains and #PrayForChennai were among the top trending hashtags across Twitter in India. Telecom major Airtel announced loan credit of ₹30 (31¢ US) and free benefits of calls and 50 MB of data. Other telecom operators including Vodafone, Aircel, and Reliance Communications also offered free benefits to customers. Indian real estate portal Commonfloor.com created links on its company website for people who need shelter or want to offer shelter. Mobile healthcare startup DocsApp provided free consultation with specialist doctors via mobile.

People helped create online spreadsheets documenting possible shelters and a crowd-sourced map on 27–28 November to document inundated neighbourhoods and streets in Chennai. Outside India, many members of the Indian and Tamil diaspora sent non-perishable food, clothes, bedding and relief funds from countries including Malaysia, Singapore, the UAE, Mexico and the United States. Tamil and Indian communities across the United States organised dozens of relief and fundraising drives in over 50 cities, raising roughly ₹650 million (US$7 million) in donations by the second week of December.

Many NGOs sent tonnes of food, bedding, clothing and relief materials. Companies including Ola Cabs, Paytm, Practo and Zomato also aided in the relief efforts. Nestlé, Coca-Cola, PepsiCo, ITC, MTR, Britannia and Parle contributed thousands of instant meals, boxes of biscuits and 1-litre water bottles, along with tonnes of milk products and coffee; other major corporations, including Hyundai and Hindustan Unilever, donated vehicles and hundreds of thousands of food and medicine packets and actively aided with rescue efforts across the state. Hyundai India donated ₹20 million (US$207,685) to the Tamil Nadu Chief Minister's Relief fund; U.S. information technology multinational Cognizant made a direct donation of ₹650 million (US$7 million) to the relief fund and various Chennai-based NGOs, while contributing a further ₹1.95 billion (US$20 million) towards the long-term recovery efforts of staff and business partners.

Several notable actors donated towards relief efforts, including: Vijay (₹50 million (US$519,213)), Rajinikanth (₹1 million (US$10,384)), Raghava Lawrence (₹10 million (US$103,843)), Ajith Kumar (₹6 million (US$62,306)), Shah Rukh Khan (₹10 million (US$103,843))., Allu Arjun (₹2.5 million (US$25,961)), Suriya and Karthi (₹2.5 million (US$25,961)), Vishal (₹1 million (US$10,384)), Dhanush (₹500,000 (US$5,200)), Varun Tej (₹300,000 (US$3,100)) and Sai Dharam Tej (₹300,000 (US$3,100), in food and medicines). Telugu actors, including Ravi Teja, N. T. Rama Rao Jr., Mahesh Babu, Pawan Kalyan, Prabhas, and Rana Daggubati donated a further ₹3 million (US$31,153), Actress Shriya Saran donated medical supplies to the affected regions in Chennai while also giving means for anyone to contribute supplies through her foundation Shree Spandana.

Saina Nehwal and Dipika Pallikal announced a donation of ₹200,000 (US$2,100) each for the flood victims. Retired Sri Lankan cricketers Kumar Sangakkara and Muttiah Muralitharan donated ₹6.698 lakh (US$6,955) and ₹1 crore (US$103,843) respectively while Indian cricketer M.S. Dhoni donated ₹7.5 million (US$77,882). Sex workers in the Ahmednagar district of Maharashtra donated ₹100,000 (US$1,000) towards flood relief efforts by using their savings and eating just one meal a day. A group of Carnatic musicians including vocalists K.N. Shashikiran, Aruna Sairam, P. Unnikrishnan, Nirmala Rajasekar, P. Ganesh and Thanjavur Murugaboopathi distributed food and supplies to families. Film composer Anirudh Ravichander announced that proceeds from his Anirudh Live concert in Toronto would go to relief efforts in Chennai. Amongst several tribute songs, actor Vikram produced and directed a song titled "Spirit of Chennai" featuring several South Indian film actors and singers.

== Aftermath ==
By the end of December 2015, most hospitals in Chennai had wholly or partially restored services. State health authorities in Tamil Nadu reported post-flooding sanitation efforts had been successful, and that there had not been any flood-related outbreaks of disease. While floodwaters had largely receded by 19 December, areas of stagnant water covered parts of Tamil Nadu into January 2016, notably around Cuddalore and Tuticorin. Central government survey teams conducted studies on the extent on the flooding in early January.

From 29 December 2015, the Tamil Nadu state government began a massive slum clearance programme, demolishing dozens of illegally constructed dwellings in the Saidapet area of Chennai. Located along the banks of the Adyar River, the area had been among those worst affected by the floods. The residents were rehoused in government housing being built in Okkiyam Thoraipakkam and Perumbakkam. The government further announced that the rehoused residents would receive an allowance of ₹30,000 (US$312) a year to help them resettle. Medical care would be arranged, children would be enrolled in schools and vocational training would be provided for job-seekers. Despite voicing concern over their ability to find new jobs, many of those resettled expressed satisfaction with the new flats. By March 2016, 4,100 families who had lived in the area had been resettled, and the city corporation had cleared away hundreds of illegally encroaching constructions, widening the Adyar River in Saidapet to 220 metres from its previous 50-metre width.

The Chennai Corporation said civic construction projects totalling ₹4 billion (US$42 million) and halted by the floods would resume in earnest, and would be completed by 29 February 2016. The corporation also announced that damaged roads would quickly be re-paved and previously shelved storm drain projects would resume. By February 2016, repair work on the damaged boundary walls at Chennai International Airport had largely been completed. Based on the findings of a preliminary report submitted by an IIT-Madras research team, the Airports Authority of India (AAI) announced plans to conduct a full study of the causes of excessive flooding at the airport, along with plans to implement a comprehensive flood-management system; the study was expected to be completed by the end of 2016. In March 2016, Chennai's Water Resources Department began work to revitalise and repair reservoirs in Poondi, Cholavaram, Red Hills and Chembarambakkam. The project would include work to strengthen bunds, install flood warning systems and repair sluice gates; it was scheduled to be completed by the end of 2016, at a cost of ₹130 million (US$1 million). Local NGOs and hydrology experts emphasised the continued need for a comprehensive action plan to protect urban water bodies, however.

In state legislative assembly elections in May 2016, the AIADMK was returned to power in Tamil Nadu, albeit with a reduced majority. The party lost eight seats to the opposing DMK in Chennai district and a further eight seats elsewhere; its losses were attributed to its perceived failure to properly address the flood crisis. On 16 June, K. Rosaiah, the governor of Tamil Nadu, announced the state government would soon develop comprehensive flood protection plans for Chennai and its surrounding coastal districts; he said the emphasis would be on providing better roads, storm water drains, solid waste management, sewerage management and street lights. The initiatives would be synergised with the Smart Cities Programme and the Atal Mission for Rejuvenation and Urban Transformation scheme. Funding had also been obtained from the World Bank and from the Asian Development Bank for climate-change impact reduction initiatives, as well as for the restoration of water bodies and tanks. As of July 2016, however, local citizens' groups said no constructive work had been done to rejuvenate local water bodies and that the effects of a similar north-east monsoon would have an equally destructive impact.

In August 2016, a parliamentary panel recommended an immediate special relief and rehabilitation package for Tamil Nadu, in "consonance with the demand of the state." Observing a monetary estimate for flood-related damages in the state could total "thousands of crores", the panel's recommendations included a crackdown on criminals involved in illegal construction, a swift removal of illegal encroachments from flood channels and riverbeds, the preparation of a calamity map of all important cities and including "standard vulnerability indices", and a continued level of high vigilance by central and state authorities, notably by the Home Affairs Ministry and the National Disaster Management Authority.

In response to harsh criticism of a severe lack of transparency and co-ordination during the crisis, the Tamil Nadu government developed a comprehensive disaster response plan, which was successfully implemented when Cyclone Vardah struck the state in December 2016; the plan effectively coordinated local, state and national relief efforts during and after the cyclone. In February 2017, the Tamil Nadu government announced plans to desilt 12 waterbodies in Chennai at a cost of ₹140 million (US$1 million). In April, the Chennai city corporation began the process of mechanically desilting the city's canals and drains using imported recyclers and robotic excavators. Elsewhere in Tamil Nadu, 49 projects in Kancheepuram district to reclaim, revive and strengthen bunds and waterbodies were reported to be nearing completion, at a cost of ₹47.65 million (US$494,810). In May 2017, the Tamil Nadu government inaugurated several flood protection and dam construction and rebuilding projects in Cuddalore district, which had been one of the worst-affected districts during the floods; the projects were estimated to cost ₹1.4 billion (US$15 million). In June, representatives of the Chennai Water Resources Department said the department was developing an eight-year, ₹12 billion (US$125 million) "master plan" to restore 18 major waterbodies in the Chennai metropolitan area.

== Analysis of causes ==
=== Unregulated urban planning and illegal construction ===
Union Minister for Environment and Forests Prakash Javadekar termed the Chennai floods a "natural disaster of unappreciated scale", and said it provided lessons to improve urban planning and improve city governance. "Chennai gives a lesson, and we must learn from this lesson and improve our urban planning and improve city governance, which is very essential." He also criticised the Chennai Corporation for not having done enough "to remove all encroachments. Unless you allow the drains to flow freely to the sea, water will be clogged and that is what has unfortunately happened."

Sunita Narain, the director of the Centre for Science and Environment (CSE) think tank, said the unprecedented floods in the Chennai metropolitan region were the direct result of unregulated urbanisation. According to Narain, "our urban sprawls such as Delhi, Kolkata, Mumbai, Chennai, Srinagar, etc., have not paid adequate attention to the natural water bodies that exist in them. In Chennai, each of its lakes has a natural flood discharge channel which drains the spillover. But we have built over many of these water bodies, blocking the smooth flow of water. We have forgotten the art of drainage. We only see land for buildings, not for water." According to research conducted by CSE, Chennai had over 600 lakes in the 1980s, but a master plan published in 2008 showed only a fraction of them to be in a healthy condition. State records have shown the total area of 19 major lakes shrank from 1,130 hectares in the 1980s to around 645 hectares in the early 2000s, reducing their storage capacity.

=== Improper design and maintenance of drainage systems ===
Media reports stated the Chennai Corporation had ignored September warnings of above-average monsoonal rains issued by the India Meteorological Department, and that extensive and costly projects begun in 2013 to desilt city storm drains had been ineffectively conducted. The drains themselves were reported to have been shoddily built and improperly designed. Drains carrying surplus water from tanks to other wetlands had also been encroached upon, while city storm water drains were clogged and required immediate desilting. Chennai has only 855 km of stormwater drains against 2,847 km of urban roads, resulting in flooding after even a marginally heavy downpour. A 2015 CAG report revealed that a diversion channel from the Buckingham canal near Okkiyum Maduvu to the sea (a drain project under the JNNURM scheme) could have saved South Chennai from flooding; the government, however, dropped the ₹1 billion scheme, which, had it been completed, would have drained floodwater from southern neighbourhood at a rate of 3,500 cubic feet per second. The 2015 CAG report said the defective planning of flood control projects caused delays and increased costs, defeating the objective of the scheme. "The fact is that alleviation of inundation of flood water in Chennai city remains largely unachieved", it said.

=== Climate-change related ===
Union Environment and Forests Minister Javadekar said the exact causes of the flooding – whether the result of climate change or stemming from other causes – remained in "a grey area" as experts had differing opinions. Regarding the current floods, he said the United Nations would not deem the evidence conclusive enough to be able to reach a judgment. "One thing is sure, climate change brings such disasters more frequently. So [the] frequency, [the] ferocity of untimely rains increases, [along with] erratic monsoons, droughts and floods; all these are caused [by climate change]." he said. He subsequently clarified his position on the Tamil Nadu floods in a written statement addressed to the Rajya Sabha. According to Javadekar, the recent extreme rainfall across the region was "highly localised" and could not be definitively attributed to the effects of climate-change. "[The] extreme rainfall that occurred over [the] coastal districts of Tamil Nadu is part of the natural variability of the Indian monsoon system. Although some studies have reported an increase in frequency and intensity of extremes in rainfall during the past 40–50 years, their attribution to global warming is not established." Javadekar said the Inter-Governmental Panel on Climate Change (IPCC) and local assessments have indicated that extreme rainfall events will likely increase in frequency by the end of the 21st century.

In 2006, a study by the Indian Institute of Tropical Meteorology (IITM) in Pune showed extreme precipitation events had increased in frequency and intensity in India over the period from 1950 to the 2000s; while CSE's climate change experts recommend detailed attribution studies to establish more links between the Chennai floods and climate change, they did state that existing scientific studies establish a possible connection.

== Controversies ==
=== Inadequate response of authorities ===
Many flood victims across Chennai and Tamil Nadu protested ineffectual response and the lack of help from authorities. In the chief minister's state assembly constituency of Radhakrishnan Nagar, flood victims heckled senior ministers Natham Viswanathan, Sellur Raju and Gokul Indira following their visit on 4 December, forcing them to make a hasty retreat. At a subsequent press conference, Tamil Nadu Power Minister Natham Viswanathan and chief secretary Gnanadesikan claimed that relief and rescue work were in full swing and "extraordinary". Viswanathan deflected opposition criticism of relief efforts as politically motivated, in light of upcoming assembly elections. He claimed people in even the worst-affected localities had refused to leave their homes and had accepted only food relief from official agencies.

Following a statement by Chief Minister Jayalalithaa that the flooding had been the result of exceptional rainfall, the Bharatiya Janata Party (BJP) issued a strong criticism on 16 November, stating that the flooding in Chennai could have been averted if local and state officials had taken strong precautions. The state BJP president, Tamilisai Soundararajan, said: "Even if it was six months of rain on a single day, the administration should have been ready to tackle it." Tamilisai mentioned the cleaning and de-silting of the Cooum River would allow it to divert large amounts of runoff during the monsoons.

In North Chennai area, residents staged protests and criticised the government for its lack of any rescue response in their locality. In Puducherry, AIADMK legislator A Anbazhagan said that the government was not providing relief to affected people and had not taken any precautions, contrary to the government's assurances; he added the administration failed to promptly mobilise various essential departments and urged the territorial administration to carefully prepare a report to ensure delivery of relief to those affected. Jet Skis and SUV vehicles were used in places like Anna Nagar to aid the people in mobility due to the high water level. Following numerous complaints regarding the Tamil Nadu state government's lack of relief effort co-ordination, a public-interest litigation petition was filed in the Madras High Court; on 11 December, Chief Justice S.K. Kaul and Justice Puspha Sathyanarayana heard the petition and converted it to suo moto proceedings. The justices directed the state government to report its relief-effort co-ordination measures to the court by 16 December.

After the Tamil Nadu government announced a flood-relief package on 7 December, many flood survivors criticised it as meagre and "insulting." DMK leader M.K. Stalin said the state's financial assistance of ₹5,000 (US$52) for each displaced family "would not be of much help to the people." A survey conducted in the worst-affected districts of Chennai by a group of volunteer organisations between 15 and 30 December found that most families had lost their sources of livelihood, and that the amount of financial assistance was insufficient. Lacking ration cards, migrant workers were the worst off, as they were ineligible for any assistance. Many residents in those areas complained the authorities had insufficiently taken measures to prepare for the floods.

The National Campaign on Dalit Human Rights (NCDHR) and the Social Awareness Society for Youths (SASY) surveyed 8,400 Dalit and non-Dalit families in 20 villages in the Cuddalore region in December 2015 and found that around 90 percent of the houses, livestock and crops destroyed in the floods belonged to Dalit families, who made up the majority of flood-displaced people. The final report alleged dominant caste people blocked access to clean water, medicines; official relief measures were concentrated in more accessible upper-caste neighbourhoods. On average, a majority of Dalit settlements were located only 1.5 km from rivers, canals and the sea and most primary health centres were located in dominant caste neighbourhoods and were, on average, three km from Dalit settlements.

=== Criticism of AIADMK ===
The AIADMK received heavy public criticism following reports of party workers pasting photographs of party leader and Tamil Nadu chief minister Jayalalithaa on relief materials, erecting banners and posters praising her, allegedly halting relief shipments en route to Chennai to paste her photos on relief packages and threatening volunteers. These incidents were reported mostly in Chennai and Cuddalore. In one incident caught on video and widely broadcast on Tamil television, an AIADMK functionary mouthing expletives and accompanied by henchmen was seen intimidating volunteers from Bengaluru who were preparing food in Anna Nagar for distribution to flood-affected people; the cadre demanded 2,000 relief packets so he could be seen distributing them. The party also released a poem on social media praising Jayalalithaa despite near-universal condemnation of government relief efforts.

In response to the mounting criticism, an AIADMK party official said the media was distorting events and attempting to smear the party before the upcoming assembly elections; however, he promised the party would take strict action against those obstructing relief work. CPI (Marxist) leader U Vasuki said, "The whole state is in crisis. This is not the right time to shower praise. Moreover, the state [government] has not done anything commendable to [merit] praise [of its] relief efforts. The timing of such propaganda is shocking."

=== Media controversies ===
In Tamil Nadu, partisan television channels associated with the ruling AIADMK and the opposing DMK political parties were criticised for using the disaster for their own political purposes. Also, several claimed that the political parties obstructed the flood relief efforts of the volunteers for their own gains. National media outlets were widely criticised on social media for failing to adequately report on the flood crisis. On 2 December, the government Press Information Bureau (PIB) released an edited photo showing the Prime Minister looking down from an aircraft window which was removed after criticism.
