= VOAR =

VOAR may refer to:

- VOAR-FM, a Canadian radio station
- INS Rajali, an Indian naval air station in Tamil Nadu, India, ICAO code VOAR
