= Department of Revenue and Disaster Management (Tamil Nadu) =

Government department of Tamil Nadu

Agency overview
- Formed: 1811
- Jurisdiction: Tamil Nadu
- Headquarters: Chennai
- Minister responsible: K. A. Sengottaiyan, Minister for Revenue
- Agency executives: P. Amudha, IAS, Addl. Chief Secretary to Government; A. S. Sourienarayanan, Joint Secretary
- Parent agency: Government of Tamil Nadu
- Website: Revenue Department; Commissionerate of Revenue Administration and Disaster Management

The Department of Revenue and Disaster Management of the State of Tamil Nadu is a government department in the Indian state of Tamil Nadu.

== History ==
The department was established in 1803 by the Board of Revenue Regulation, 1803 by the British East India Company and was further modified through Revenue Recovery Act, 1864 during the British Raj. The department was reconstituted by the Tamil Nadu Board of Revenue Act, 1894. It was adopted by the Madras State post Indian Independence as a part of the Merged States (Laws) Act, 1949. It was renamed in 1980 by the Tamil Nadu Board of Revenue Abolition Act, 1980.

== Objective ==
The Revenue Department has the following objectives:

- Providing efficient delivery of services of various Government schemes to the people of Tamil Nadu
- Providing relief and implementing rehabilitation measures for those affected by Natural Calamities
- Functioning as the custodian of Government lands and ensuring proper maintenance of land records for the State
- Implementation of Land Reforms and providing land to the needy and eligible persons

== Constitution ==
Following are the sub-departments under the revenue department:

- Commissionerate of Revenue Administration, Disaster Management and Mitigation
- Commissionerate of Land Administration
- Commissionerate of Land Reforms
- Commissionerate of Survey and Settlement
- Directorate of Urban Land Ceiling and Land Tax

== Organization ==
At the government level, the Revenue and Disaster Management Department is led by the Minister for Revenue, who serves as its political head. On the administrative side, the department is headed by an Additional Chief Secretary or Principal Secretary to the Government, typically an officer of the Indian Administrative Service (IAS).

At the field level, the Commissioner of Revenue Administration and Disaster Management oversees the department’s functioning and ensures coordination across the state. For effective administration, the state is divided into 38 districts, each headed by a District Collector. The District Collectorate acts as the administrative headquarters of the district, where the Collector is supported by Additional or Joint Collectors and Deputy Collectors in handling various responsibilities.

Each district is further divided into revenue divisions, which are managed by Revenue Divisional Officers (RDOs) or Sub-Collectors. There are a total of 94 revenue divisions in Tamil Nadu. These divisions consist of several taluks, administered by Tehsildars. In turn, taluks are subdivided into revenue circles, which include multiple revenue villages. At the grassroots level, village offices serve as the foundation of the land revenue administrative system. There are a total of 317 taluks, 1197 revenue circles and 16,744 revenue villages in Tamil Nadu.

== Ministers ==
The department is headed by a ministeheaded

- Sattur Ramachandran (2021–26)
- R. B. Udhayakumar (2014–21)
- B. V. Ramanaa (2013–14)
- N. D. Venkatachalam (2012–13)
- K. A. Sengottaiyan (2012, 2026-present)
- P. Thangamani (2011–12)
- I. Periyasamy (2006–11)
- Thalavai N. Sundaram (2002)
- O. Panneerselvam (2001–06)

== See also ==
- Tamil Nadu Government's Departments
- Ministry of Micro, Small and Medium Enterprises
