= Vasudevan Gnana Gandhi =

Indian rocket scientist

- Born: Vaduvarpatti, Virudhunagar District, Tamil Nadu, India
- Occupations: Rocket scientist, retired in 2006
- Years active: since 1968
- Awards: Padma Shri; Aeronautical Society of India Award

Vasudevan Gnana Gandhi is an Indian rocket scientist, known as the pioneer of cryogenic rocket science in India. A graduate in Mechanical Engineering from the Thiagarajar College of Engineering, Madurai, Gandhi started his career by joining ISRO in 1968 and held many positions such as Project Director and Programme Director at ISRO. His contributions are reported behind the development of booster liquid stages of the GSLV and the uprating of VIKAS engine. A recipient of the Aeronautical Society of India Award, Gandhi was honored by the Government of India, in 2005, with the fourth highest Indian civilian award of Padma Shri. Currently, Vasudevan Gnana Gandhi is working as Senior Vice President-Propulsion at Skyroot Aerospace, Hyderabad and also as chief academic advisor to Givemefive.ai.

== See also ==
- Cryogenic rocket engine
- Geosynchronous Satellite Launch Vehicle
