= Thiagarajar College of Engineering =

Government-aided Engineering College in Madurai, India

- Motto: வினையே உயிர்
- Motto in English: where quality and ethics matter
- Type: Government Aided Engineering College
- Established: 1957; 69 years ago
- Academic affiliations: Anna University
- Chairman: K. Hari Thiagarajan
- Principal: Dr. L. Ashok Kumar
- Faculty: 299
- Location: Madurai, Tamil Nadu, 625015, India
- Campus: 140+ acres (57+ ha); Suburban
- Website: www.tce.edu

Thiagarajar College of Engineering (TCE) is an Government-aided autonomous institution located in Thiruparankundram, Madurai, Tamil Nadu, India. It is affiliated to Anna University.

== History ==
Thiagarajar College of Engineering is one of several educational institutions founded by the late philanthropist and industrialist Karumuttu Thiagarajan Chettiar. TCE was established in 1957 under the University of Madras. The courses offered in TCE are approved by the All India Council for Technical Education, New Delhi. TCE was granted autonomy in the year 1987.

== Location ==
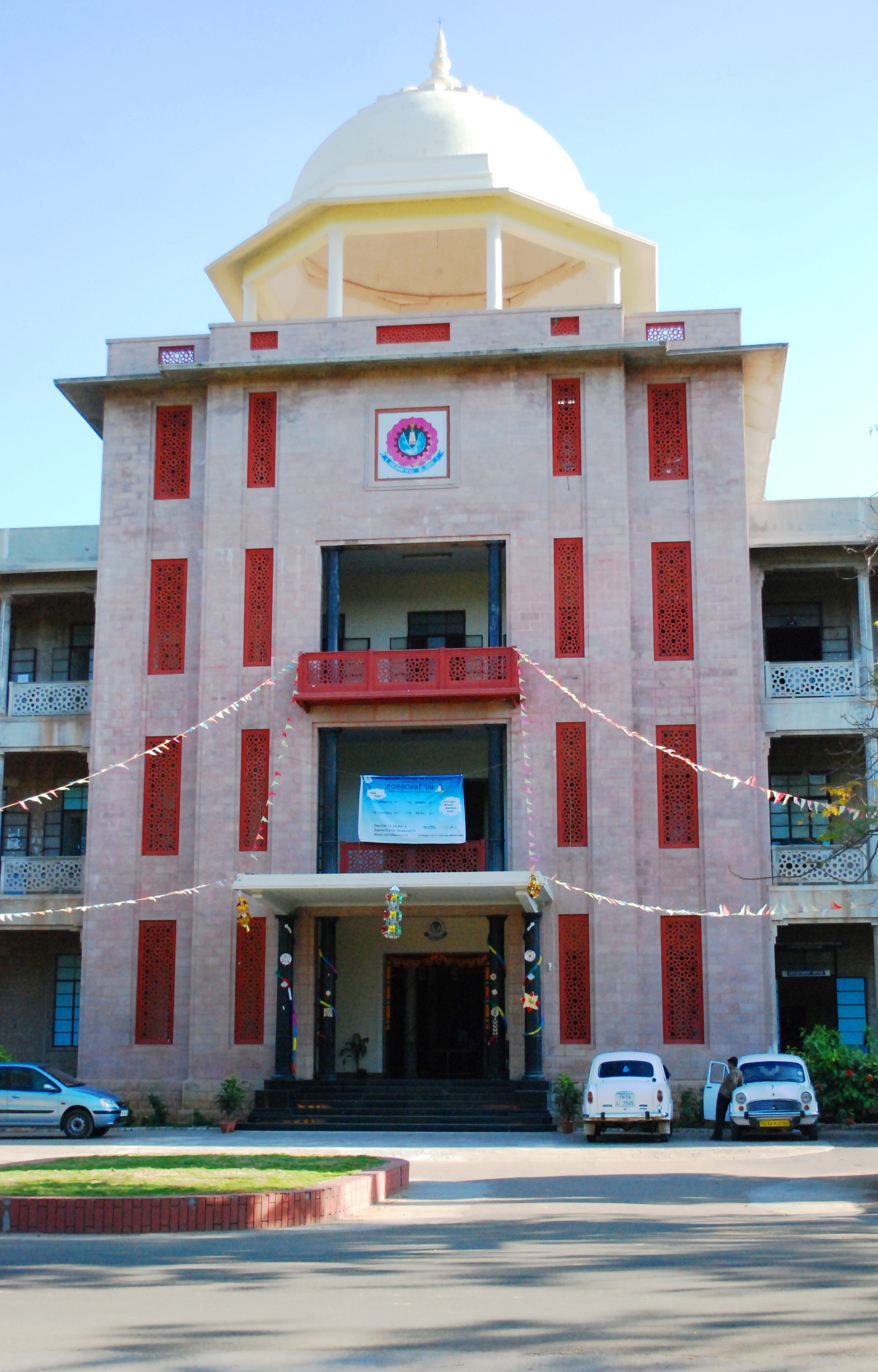
Thiagarajar College of Engineering

The institution and hostels are located near Thirupparankundram on the outskirts of Madurai, 8 kilometres south-west of the city of Madurai.

The campus is located 10 km from the Madurai Airport, 8 km from the Madurai Railway station and 2 km from Thirupparankundram railway station and is well connected by buses with all parts of state.

== Academic programs ==
The institution offers 9 undergraduate programmes in engineering and technology, 2 programmes in architecture and design, 1 integrated programme, 6 postgraduate programmes, and research programmes leading to M.S. (By Research) and Ph.D degrees in both full-time and part-time modes, covering the fields of engineering, technology, planning, and computer applications.

== Rankings ==
College rankings

General – international
- Times (World) (2024): 1201-1500

Engineering – India
- NIRF (2024): 101–150

Architecture – India
- NIRF (2024): 25

Over the past five years, TCE has been ranked as follows in the National Institutional Ranking Framework (NIRF) engineering category:

Year	Rank (Engineering)	Ref.
2024	101–150	
2023	101–150	
2022	85	
2021	71	
2020	64	

TCE also appears in international rankings. In the Times Higher Education (THE) World University Rankings 2025, it is placed in the 1501+ global band overall, and in the Engineering subject table it is in the 1251+ band.

== Notable alumni ==
- Padma Bhushan A. Sivathanu Pillai, Honorary Distinguished Professor at ISRO
- Padma Shri Nagarajan Vedachalam, Scientist
- Padma Shri Vasudevan Gnana Gandhi, Scientist
- Karthik Subbaraj, Kollywood director
- Padma Bhushan Nambi Narayanan, Scientist. The Indian film Rocketry: The Nambi Effect was based on his life.
