= Karumuttu Thiagarajan Chettiar =

Indian industrialist, educationist and independence activist

K. M. Thiagarajan
- Born: Karumuttu Muthukaruppan Thiagarajan Chettiar; 16 June 1893; Athikkadu Thekkur, Madura District, Madras Presidency, British India, (now Sivaganga district, Tamil Nadu, India)
- Died: 29 July 1974 (aged 81); Madurai, Tamil Nadu, India
- Occupations: activist, industrialist

Karumuttu Thiagarajan Chettiar (16 June 1893 – 29 July 1974), often called the 'Textile King ' or 'Textile Baron ', was an Indian independence activist, industrialist and the founder of Thiagarajar College of Engineering, Thiagarajar school of management, and Thiagarajar Polytechnic College, Salem.

Chettiar was born in 1893 to Muthukaruppan Chettiar and Vinaitherthal achi (Sivakami achi) was born in Sivagangai District, Madras Presidency. He was the tenth and last child in his family. He was educated at S. Thomas' College, Mount Lavinia, Colombo, Sri Lanka. He edited a newspaper championing the cause of the plantation workers. He returned from Sri Lanka and was elected Secretary of the Madras Province Congress Committee of the Indian National Congress. In his lifetime Chettiar established fourteen textile mills - notable among these The Sree Meenakshi Mills which was once adjudged Asia’s most modern spinning mill and Rukmini Mills, purchased the Loyal Textile Mills -currently a BSE Listed Company, P.Orr and Sons - luxury watch makers and retailers popularly known as the ‘Time keepers of Madras’, the Bank of Madurai, and the Madurai Insurance Company. For a number of years he also published a daily newspaper called Tamil Nadu Daily. Chettiar also established nineteen educational institutions including Thiagarajar Preceptors College, Thiagarajar School of Management, Thiagarajar College of Engineering and Thiagarajar Polytechnic College.
