= INS Rajali =

Naval air station in India

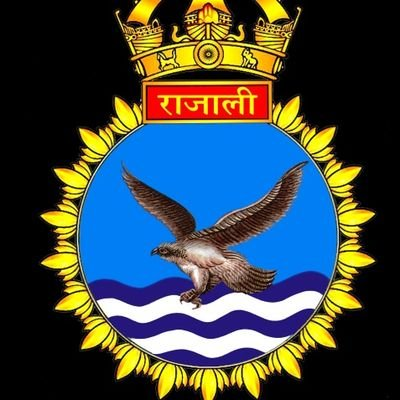
- Crest of INS Rajali
- IATA: none; ICAO: VOAR

Summary
- Airport type: Naval Air Station
- Operator: Indian Navy
- Location: Arakkonam, Ranipet district, Tamil Nadu
- Elevation AMSL: 285 ft (87 m)
- Coordinates: 13°04′16″N 079°41′28″E
- Interactive map of INS Rajali

Runways
Direction	Length		Surface
Direction	ft	m	Surface
06/24	13,460	4,103	Asphalt concrete

INS Rajali, (IATA: N/A, ICAO: VOAR) is an Indian naval air station located near Arakkonam, Chennai Metropolitan Area, Ranipet district, Tamil Nadu in southern India. It operates under the Southern Naval Command of the Indian Navy, and has the longest military runway in Asia.

== History ==
The airfield at Arakkonam was constructed in early 1942, for use by Allies of World War II. The first recorded air operations from the field took place when the No. 2 Squadron of the Royal Indian Air Force, flying Westland Lysander aircraft flew support missions for the British Indian Army between May and Sep 1942.

The airfield was abandoned after the war and lay unused until the 1980s, when it was transferred to the Indian Navy who rehabilitated and commissioned the airfield as INS Rajali. INS Rajali was commissioned on 11 March 1992. The commissioning commanding officer was Captain RS Vasan, who subsequently retired in the rank of commodore while on deputation to the Indian Coast Guard as the Regional Commander of Coast Guard Region East. Rajali, named after a bird, was commissioned by then President R. Venkataraman. The upgraded airbase became home to an anti-submarine warfare squadron, INAS 312, which moved here from INS Hansa in Goa. On 16 April 1988, the Tupolev Tu-142MK-E aircraft were commissioned into the squadron by the then Defence Minister, K. C. Pant, at INS Hansa. The Albatross as they are called celebrated the silver jubilee of induction at Rajali. The replacement aircraft for the TU 142 M are P8i Poseidon and eight of them have started operating from Rajali. The Helicopter Training School which operated from INS Garuda was shifted to Rajali from July 1991 in the year of commissioning itself and has been training rotary-wing pilots of the Navy and the Coast Guard ever since. This self-contained base celebrated its silver jubilee on 11 March 2017. Boeing will establish a training facility spanning 60,000 sq ft for the P-8I Neptune by 2021.

INS Rajali now spans 2,320 acres (9.4 km^{2}) and has the longest military runway in Asia.

== 2015 Floods ==
During the 2015 South India Floods when Chennai International Airport was closed due to floodwaters, INS Rajali was used as a makeshift airport for relief operations as well as limited commercial flights. Some passengers had been brought from flooded areas by helicopter. Commuter services on the Chennai Suburban Railway were operated from Arakkonam Junction for the benefit of passengers coming by air through Rajali.

== Units ==
INS Rajali is home to the navy's INAS 312 squadron which operates P-8I Neptune

== See also ==
Indian navy

- List of Indian Navy bases
- List of active Indian Navy ships

Integrated commands and units

- Armed Forces Special Operations Division
- Defence Cyber Agency
- Integrated Defence Staff
- Integrated Space Cell
- Indian Nuclear Command Authority
- Indian Armed Forces
- Special Forces of India

Other lists

- Strategic Forces Command
- List of Indian Air Force stations
- List of Indian Navy bases
- India's overseas military bases
