= P. Amudha =

Indian civil servant

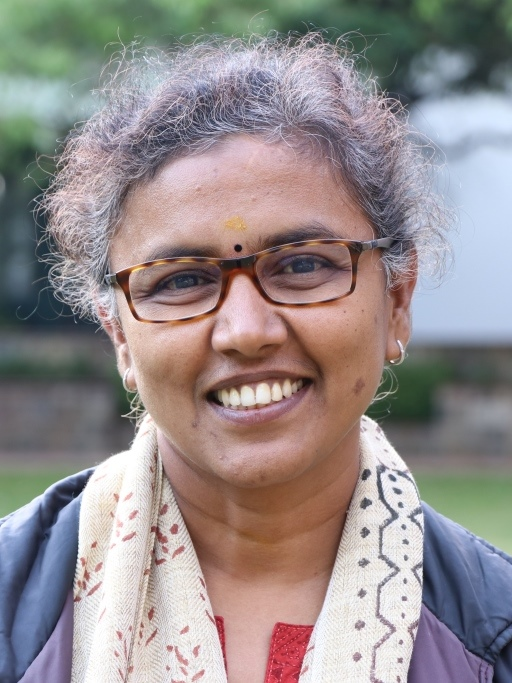
- P. Amudha in 2019

Additional Chief Secretary to Government of Tamil Nadu (Revenue and Disaster Management Department)
- Chief Minister: C. Joseph Vijay
- Minister: S. Muthusamy

Personal details
- Born: Amudha Periasamy; 19 July 1970 (age 56) Madurai, Tamil Nadu, India
- Occupation: Indian civil servant

P. Amudha is an Indian civil servant, a 1994 batch IAS officer of Tamil Nadu cadre who is currently working as the Additional Chief Secretary (Revenue and Disaster Management) in the Tamilnadu government. She was the former Home Secretary to the Government of Tamil Nadu. Prior to this position, she was working as Principal Secretary, Rural development and Panchayat Raj. She has been called back to her parent cadre from her duty as Additional Secretary in Prime Minister's Office (PMO) for a period of fourteen months. She was working as a professor of Public Administration at the Lal Bahadur Shastri National Academy of Administration in Mussoorie, Uttarakhand before her deputation in PMO. She was the executive director of the Tamil Nadu Corporation for Development of Women under Tamil Nadu Government and has worked as a program officer with the United Nations Children's Fund for Water and Sanitation. She has worked in fifteen different departments under Government of Tamil Nadu. She is known for her penchant for being on the field and taking bold decisions.

== Career ==
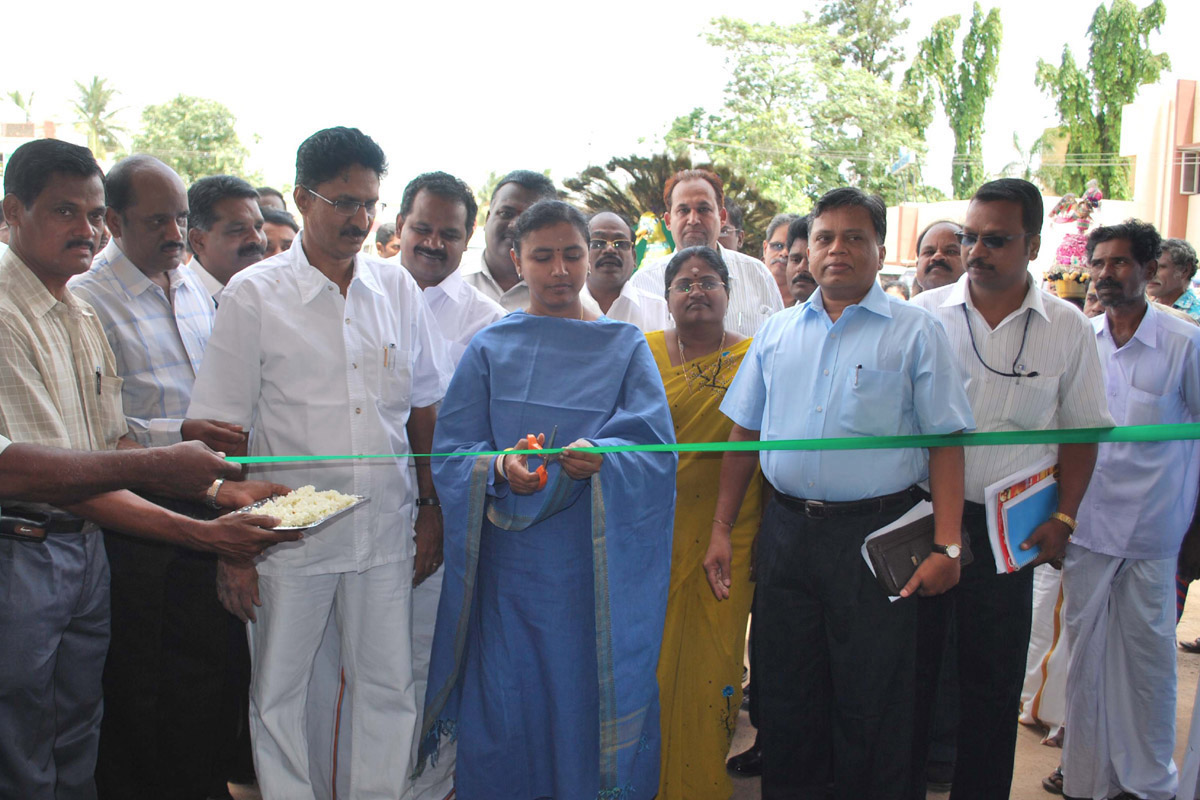
P. Amudha inaugurating Bharat Nirman Public Information Campaign at Dharmapuri in Tamil Nadu in 2008.

P. Amudha started her career as an IAS officer from 4 September 1994 in Tamil Nadu cadre. Initially, she was appointed as collector of Dharmapuri district in Tamil Nadu. She was additional chief electoral officer in the Public (Elections) Department in the Tamil Nadu Government. Prior to this position, she served in the Health and Family Welfare Department of the Tamil Nadu Government as project director and member-secretary of the Tamil Nadu State AIDS Control Society. She was the executive director for the Tamil Nadu Corporation for Development of Women in the Tamil Nadu Government, and has worked as program officer with the United Nations Children's Fund for Water and Sanitation. For many years, she was also the district collector with the Land Revenue Management and District Administration.

On 11 March 2019, P. Amudha was appointed as professor of Public Administration at Lal Bahadur Shastri National Academy of Administration (LBSNAA).

== Sports ==
P. Amudha is a kabaddi player. She was a member of the kabaddi team that won the national championship thrice. She is also trained in karate.
