= Thiagarajar School of Management =

Private business school in Madurai, Tamil Nadu, India

- Motto: Learn To Learn
- Type: Private business school
- Established: 1962
- Founder: Karumuthu Thiagarajan Chettiar
- Location: Madurai, Tamil Nadu, India
- Website: www.tsm.ac.in

Thiagarajar School of Management (TSM) is a Private business school located in Madurai, Tamil Nadu, India.

== History ==
TSM was established in 1962 by the doyen of the South Indian textile industry, Kalaithanthai Thiru Karumuttu Thiagarajan Chettiar. This 50 year old institute is located in the heart of Madurai city, in a lush green 17- acre campus with global standard infrastructure. TSM initially offered only Executive Development courses till the year 1971. MBA courses were offered part-time from 1972. Full-time MBA courses were offered from the year 1986. Full-time MCA courses were offered from the year 1994. The last batch of MCA courses was offered for the year 2009 as the same was discontinued from the year 2010.

== Academics ==
TSM offers PGDM and MBA programmes which are approved by All India Council for Technical Education (AICTE) and accredited by National Board of Accreditation (NBA), and has been conferred autonomous status by the UGC and Madurai Kamaraj University (MKU). TSM has also got the candidacy status for Accreditation with Accreditation Council for Business Schools and Programs (ACBSP).TSM’s admissions are based on all-India tests such as CAT, XAT and MAT or the State Government selection based on TANCET. YUKTI (meaning strategy), TSM’s annual business school summit, which is a completely student driven event, where participants from various prestigious B-schools of India participate in the organized management and cultural events and develop and enhance the management and technical skills in them.
