= Ba. Venkatesan =

- Born: Madurai, Tamil Nadu,` India
- Occupations: Novelist; Short story writer Literary Critic; Poet
- Writing career
- Language: Tamil
- Period: 1988–present
- Genres: Fiction non-fiction Postmodernism; Fantasy; Magical Realism; Historiographic metafiction Structuralism
- Subjects: Literature; Philosophy; History
- Notable works: Thaandavaraayan Kathai(2007); Baageerathiyin Mathiyam(2016); Vaaranasi(2018)
- Notable awards: Vilakku Virudhu (2017); Sparrow Award (2018); Tamil Thiru Award (2019); Hosur Creator Award (2019)

Ba. Venkatesan (Known as Ba.Ve) is a noted Tamil writer and Literary Critic.

His best-known and critically acclaimed works are Baageerathiyin Mathiyam, Thaandavaraayan Kathai. He currently lives in Hosur, Tamil Nadu.

== Early life ==
In his childhood, he felt quiet enthusiastic while listening stories from his maternal grand mother. He was so inspired with the stories told by her. At the age of 10, listening stories had become a habit of reading with the help of his father. As his father used to provide the copies of "Ambuli Mama" Chandamama magazine (Famous children magazine) from his office library which helped him in increasing his reading habit. On the other hand, he didn't fail to catch hold of his Grand mother for listening stories.

At the age of 14, Madurai public library had been introduced by one of his neighborhood friend. Reaching the library and waiting at the entrance, well before librarian arrives, lingering inside till the closure of library for the day was a common habit during holidays. At some instances, his mom comes and scares him with the help of librarian to take him to home for food. Before leaving with mom for home for having food, He used to get oath from librarian for getting the same book which he read when he turn up for another day.

It seems, for him, habit of writing was started at this very stage. Onset of his writing career, he was writing some comic stories based on "Vedhala Mayaathma" – (Tamil Translation of the comic strips of The Phantom by Lee Falk) tales which were being published by "Muthu Comics" – Lion comics. Then, he wrote some stories kind of Tamilvanan's.

"During his college days, eagerness for writing had been increasing when he got to know a well known Tamil writer" – Sujatha.

He had started a manuscript magazine called "Udhayam" with his friends. He also penned many kinds of stories inspired by Sujatha's work. Somehow, the Magazine work had ended up in police station due to the issues raised over paying printing charges when they planned to bring the magazine by giving it to a press for making printed copies.

In mid 80's, when he arrived at Hosur for his first stint, he happened to meet Malar Mannan through his friend and with the help of Malar Mannan, he got the opportunity to send stories for a magazine called "Idhayam Pesugiradhu". Those stories which he sent were published and It was a defining moment for him, the day when he received the printed copy of his story. Post which his stories were published in various Tamil magazines like "Kumudam", "Dinamani Kathir" – Dinamani, "Vaazhum Tamil Ulagam".

In 1987, while browsing through the pages of "Kanaiyaazhi", a magazine, hanging at the entrance of a tea stall in Salem, he discovered his world of fiction. Earlier, he thought that Kanaiyaazhi was an imaginary magazine created by Sujatha. His first poem, "Veru", was published in 1988.

== Authors who influences on Ba.Ve's work ==
He was influenced by Sujatha, only until get to know about little literary magazines. When he started writing Poetry, Ka. Naa. Subramanyam was an influence on him.

Writing stories and Acquaintance on World literature almost happened in parallel.

Though there were impacts of Gabriel García Márquez, Umberto Eco, José Saramago works on his fiction, it was not quiet intense, deep-rooted and long-lasting.

"I don't use the language for the purpose of telling an event or an incident. Instead, my language creates the event or incident."

— Ba. Venkatesan

He has identified his own way of story telling and its voices from the ancient Tamil fictions, such as "Madhanakamarajan", "Vikkiramaadhiththan", "Bagavatham" – Bhagavata Purana, "Baaratham" – Mahabharata, "Kadhaikkadal". He used to lose himself in One Thousand and One Nights. He has created his own view on story telling from some more texts as well. Like, The Bridge on the Drina, The House of the Sleeping Beauties, Dona Flor and Her Two Husbands (novel), The Master and Margarita, The Idiot ,'Moga mul', 'Avadhoodhar', 'Oru kudumbam sidhaigiradhu' – Gruhabhanga, 'Oru kadalora Giraamaththin kadhai', 'Puliyamaraththin Kadhai', 'Kullan' – The Dwarf (Lagerkvist novel).

However, even now, he is inspired and interested in the works of Milan Kundera.

He told in one of his interviews, "I hope that, One who observe my stories with great focus can identify the subtlety of Milan Kundera's stories in it."

== On poetry ==
Ba. Venkatesan's view of poetry is aesthetically fascinating, "I strongly believe that, a Poem can achieve something in quite a few lines where as the same has to be explained in hundred of pages in fiction. Language of poetry is unique. This is the reason why, I am reluctant to read the poetry which are other than the Tamil language. I am not quite sure whether we can translate a poetry. With silence, inevitably at the same time in the intense moment, it disconnects the flow of time and conceptualize in the mind of creativity. Such rare moments won't occur often. I am not kind of someone who brings it forcefully. But, sometimes, I prosperous with such rare moments as poetry has mercy on me. Prior to "Bageerathiyin Madhiyam", I mean before 2014, though I would have completed a fiction of thousand pages, i was identified as a poet in the Tamil literary context. If at all happen to write a good poem then there is no chance in getting away from it. At the same time, as fiction, poetry is not a lit lamp, it's a moment of Lightning and grand Stature which appears and vanishes suddenly"

Since 1992 to 2014, 3 poetry volumes of Venkatesan's got released. Further, a new poetry collection released along with the poems written until 2018.

== On films ==
Ba.Venkatesan has a unique opinions on films – "Not only me, my entire family is fond of movies. Even though the Art of telling stories through images and the art of telling stories through writing is basically a kind of chalk and cheese, it used to happen very frequently that directly or indirectly relating the movie scenes with my Creationism. Stories and Scenes of Horror and cow boy films are something which i used to feel that it will provoke me. Commercial films which are not having extremely heroic content is also my favorite. I had the experience of getting the Motivation for stories from the images of the body languages of Sivaji Ganesan, Charlie Chaplin, Nedumudi Venu, Bruce Lee, Christopher Lee (Dracula), Nicole Kidman, Kristen Stewart. As a fiction writer, i will set myself up that the films based on the fiction will be required more attention. I predict that Yasunari Kawabata's Sleeping Beauty has become a successful art house film and Umberto Eco's The Name of the Rose was become a mere detective story. Even i reckon the literature should face more challenges for its uniqueness when writing is successfully translated to images and in false happiness i thought to howl when i know the art of image struggles. Also i thought the movie The Color Purple – which i watched recently a kind of failed attempt to translate the fiction as a film. I especially like the genre of Indian movies which has Stunt scenes, loud verses, overt emotional acting. My thought is that these are the unique way of film making of Indian cinema. Our cinema artists will lose this uniqueness due to the ambition of getting western awards, it's audiences and their way of film making which are increasing my anxiety nowadays as a creator. However, films are making my creativity and personal routine life more lively and meaningful. It's very rare that my family is ending up with weekends and holidays without films."

== Bibliography ==
=== Novels ===
"Though it exhorts significant effort from a reader, but for the given effort, there are abundance of gems awaits out of these fictions as we have seen in world literature. I consider, Ba. Venkatesan is one of the most important writer among the international writers currently."

— Rajan Kurai Krishnan, Professor & Critic in Tamil literature.
- Thaandavaraayan Kathai

"Reading the literature by considering it as a field and fiction as one of its unit, the distance traveled and the leap performed by Tale of Thaandavaraayan (Thandavarayan Kadhai) is impossible in the scope of Tamil fiction. If at all the highest complimentary in literature is called Nobel Prize means then it can be given to Tale of Thaandavaraayan (Thaandavarayan Kadhai)"

— Vasumithra, Poet.
- Baageerathiyin Mathiyam
- Varanasi

=== Novellas anthology ===
- Rajan Magal (consists of four novellas named, 'Mazhaiyin Kural Thanimai', Aaiyiram Saradha', 'Neela Vidhi' and 'Rajan Magal')

=== Short story anthology ===
- Original Newsreel Sirukathaigal

=== Collections of poems ===
- Innum Sila Veedugal
- Ettip Paarkum Kadavul
- Neela
- Ba. Venkatesan Kavithaigal

=== Collection of essays ===
- Uyirgal Nilangal Pirathigal matrum Pengal
- Kadhaiyum Punaivum

=== Transalations from English ===
*''Murindha April (Broken April by Ismail Kadare)''
