= S. Muthu =

Indian Tamil politician

S. Muthu (1915–1984) was a Tamil Social activist of the Dravidar Kazhagam and a founding leader along with CN Annadurai, Nedunchezhian, NV Natarajan and Mathiazhgan of the Dravida Munnetra Kazhagam. Gaining considerable clout in the Madurai region, as one with aggressive tendencies, he emerged as a kingmaker following the death of CN Annadurai in early 1969, during DMK's first term in power and helped his then ally Muthuvel Karunanidhi to emerge as the leader of the party and Chief Minister of Tamil Nadu. He was the chief ally of Karunanidhi when the latter expelled MG Ramachandran (MGR) from DMK. When Karunanidhi consolidated his power base and increasingly eliminated 'old hands' of the party Mr Muthu was disillusioned with the party and later joined MGR's the Anna Dravida Munnetra Kazhagam ADMK in 1976.

Muthu's reputation as a powerful leader in the southern districts helped MGR considerably in his election campaign; as a consequence ADMK won noticeably in 1977. He served as the popular mayor of Madurai from 1971 to 1981. He also served as a member of the Tamil Nadu Legislative Council.
