= Santhananda =

H. H. Swami Santhananda Saraswati Avadhoota Swamigal (28 March 1921 – 27 May 2002) born as Subrahmanyam was a Hindu spiritual leader and teacher who established the worship of Devi Bhuvaneswari in Tamil Nadu. He was the founder of the Bhuvaneswari Peetam in Pudukkottai, Tamil Nadu, India. The very embodiment of Prema, Sri Sri Swami Santhananda was the fountainhead of Hindu Dharma and Vedic principles. In his lifetime he had conducted several yagnas as elucidated in the Sasthras and challenged orthodoxy by bringing to light, guarded Moola Mantras that ensure common good, wealth and peace.

He was a disciple of H.H.Sri Swayamprakasha Bhremendra Saraswathi of Sendamangalam and came in the lineage of H.H.Sadasiva Bhremendra Saraswathi (Sri Sri Judge Swamigal) of Pudukkottai. He founded Skandhashramam in Salem and Om Sri Skandhashramam in Chennai.

== Early life and education ==
Subrahmanyam was born as the tenth child to the devout Brahmin couple Sri.Ramaswami and his wife Yogambal in Azhagapuri village, Madurai. His parents were devotees of Madurai Meenakshi Amman. Kattikulam Sootukkol Sri Mayandi Swamigal - a famous ascetic of that time had predicted his birth and said he would be a man of action for the welfare of the world and a devotee of Goddess Bhuvaneshwari.

Subrahmanyam, as a child, studied at Naganathapuram Veda Patasala where he became well versed in the Vedas.

== Independence Movement and Prison ==
Subrahmanyam was drawn towards the Gandhian movement for Independence of India. He concentrated his activities on village uplift and amelioration of the lot of the poor. He was imprisoned in Alipore Jail for his involvement in the independence struggle. In Alipore he studied the teachings of Sri Ramakrishna Paramahamsa and Swami Vivekananda.

== Mantra Deeksha ==
From Alipore he went to Madurai and met Mayandi Yogi who initiated him in the Bhuvaneswari Mantra. He was also advised to remain silent, to subsist on alms, and also not to stay at a place for long.

== Search for a Guru ==
While travelling in the Girnar Hill, Gujarat, Subrahmanyam heard a voice commanding him to go to Sendamangalam, (Salem District, Tamil Nadu) where a Guru was waiting for him. He reached Sendamangalam and had the Darshan of Swami Swayamprakasha Bhremendra Saraswathi. At once he realized that the Avadhuta he saw in a vision at Tirunelveli was none other than Swamiji and requested that he be accepted as a disciple.

Swamiji gave his consent. He admitted Subrahmanyam to the Avadhuta order and gave him a new name Santhananda.

== Pudukkottai Adhishtanam ==
On the advice of Swami Swayamprakasa, Santhananda undertook the renovation of the Samadhi of Judge Swamigal at Pudukkottai. This Samadhi was established by Swayamprakasa Swamigal in 1936. Santhananda renovated the Samadhi and a Kumbabhishekam was conducted in 1956. This is now known as Bhuvaneswari Avadootha Vidya Peetam. The main deity here is Sri Matha Bhuvaneswari.

== Skandhashramam at Salem ==
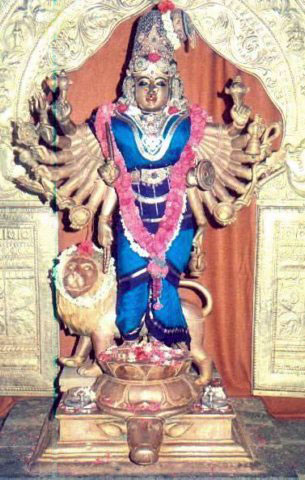
Asta Dasa Bhuja Mahalakshmi - Deity at Skandhashramam, Salem, India.

This was established by Swami Santhananda in 1968 on top of a small hill near Salem. The main Deities are ASHTA DASA BHUJA MAHALAKSHMI and SKANDA NATHA.

== Chennai Om Sri Skandhashramam ==
This was established by Swami Santhananda in 1999 in Raja Kilpakkam near Chennai. This is a Temple dedicated to MAA UGRAPRATHYANGIRA DEVI and LORD SARABHESWARA. For the first time in India a temple has been dedicated to MAA UGRAPRATHYANGIRA DEVI.
