= Tamil Nadu State Disaster Management Authority =

Government agency of Tamil Nadu

Agency overview
- Formed: 2003; 23 years ago
- Jurisdiction: Government of Tamil Nadu
- Headquarters: Chennai, Tamil Nadu
- Minister responsible: C. Joseph Vijay, Chief Minister of Tamil Nadu
- Parent department: Department of Revenue and Disaster Management

Tamil Nadu State Disaster Management Authority is a government agency in the Indian state of Tamil Nadu. Established in 2003, it is responsible for disaster management, planning and recovery.

== History ==
On 8 July 2003, Government of Tamil Nadu issued an order (G.O.323) for the constitution of a state disaster management authority (SDMA) under the Department of Revenue. The department was to be headed by the Chief Secretary and would help in preparing, mitigation and response to disasters. In December 2005, Government of India enacted the Disaster Management Act, 2005 which mandated the creation of state disaster management agencies with the chief minister of the state as the chairperson. Accordingly, On 26 September 2008, Government of Tamil Nadu issued an order (G.O.564) to reconstitute the SDMA with the Chief Minister of Tamil Nadu as the chairperson for monitoring the disaster management activities in the state.

== Composition ==
SDMA is constituted of a chairperson and ten members:

Constituent	Role
Chief Minister of Tamil Nadu	Chairperson
Minister for Revenue	Member
Chief Secretary of Tamil Nadu	Member
Secretary of Revenue	Member
Secretary of Finance	Member
Secretary of Home	Member
Secretary of School Education	Member
Secretary of Higher Education	Member
State relief commissioner and Commissioner of Revenue Administration	Member
Director, Centre for Disaster Management and Mitigation, Anna University	Member
Head, Department of Civil Engineering, Indian Institute of Technology, Madras	Member

== TN disaster response force ==
Tamil Nadu disaster response force was planned to be set up on the lines of National Disaster Response Force (NDRF). In 2017, TN disaster response force (TNDRF) was set up as a special team of Tamil Nadu Police at Avadi with 1,000 people to be trained by NDRF.
