= List of mosques in Istanbul =

Istanbul, as the capital of the Ottoman Empire since 1453 and the largest city in the Middle East, contains a great number of mosques. In 2007, there were 2,944 active mosques in Istanbul.

== Byzantine buildings ==
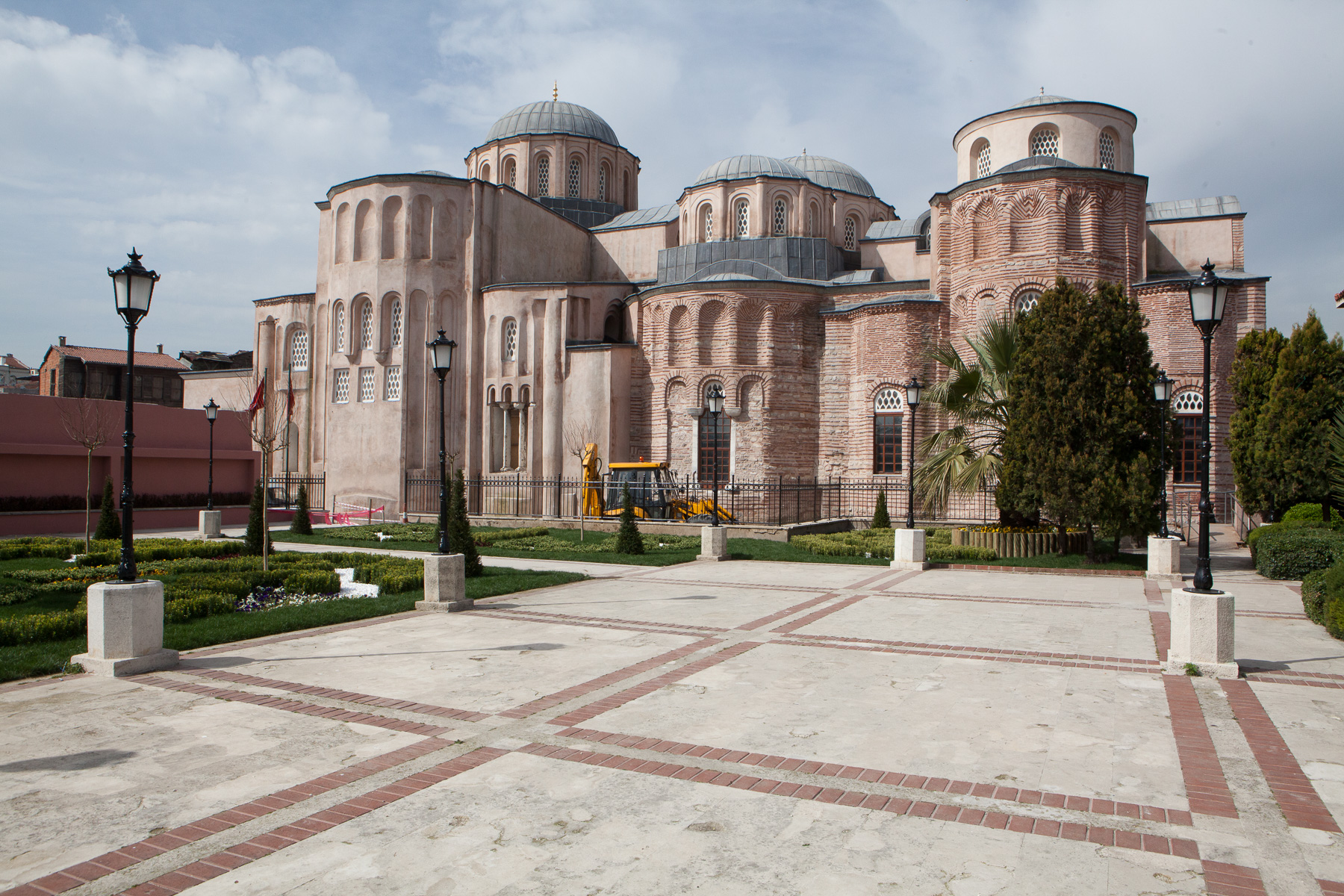
Zeyrek Mosque

Hagia Sophia

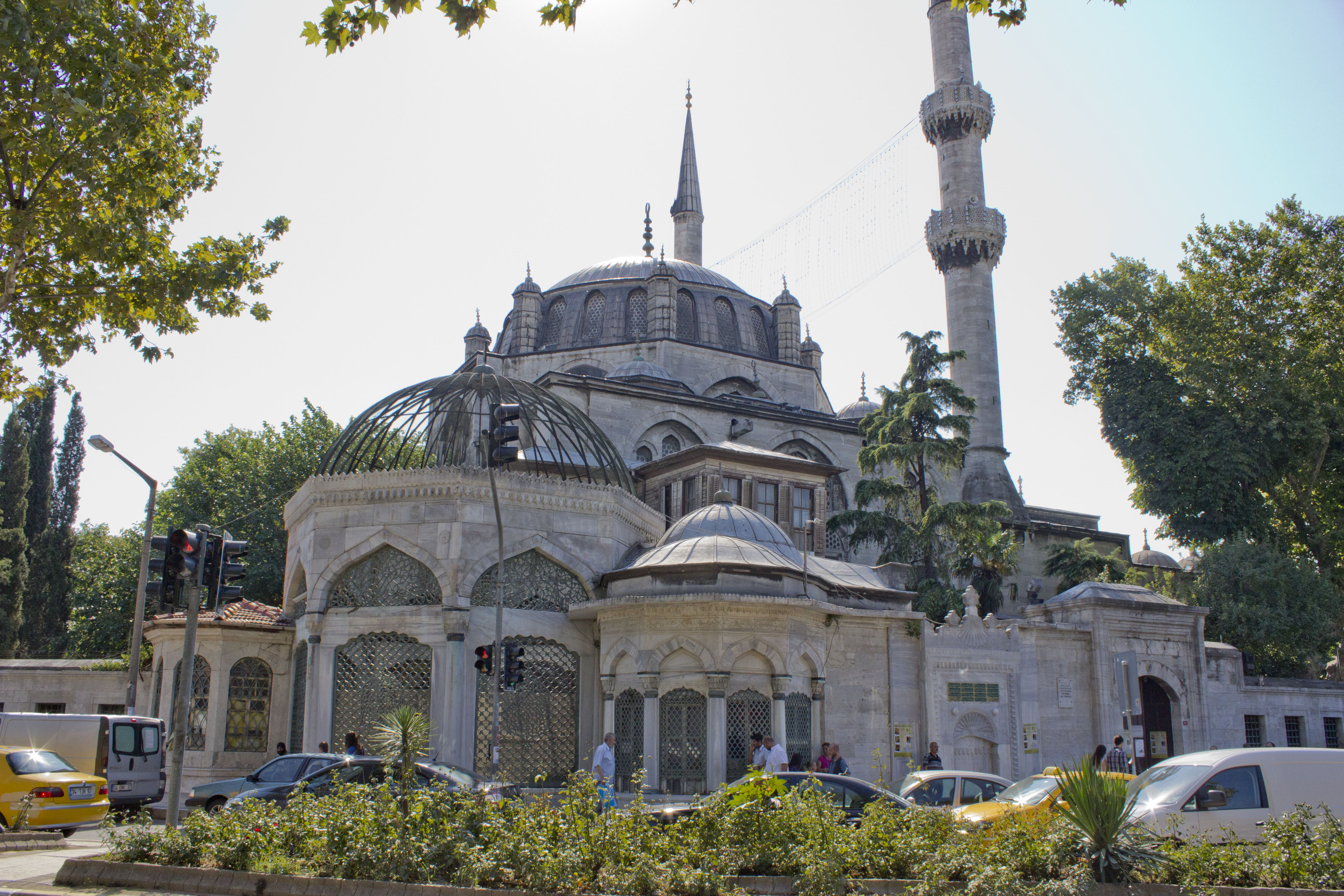
Yeni Valide Mosque

These Byzantine structures were converted to mosques by the Ottomans.

- Arap Mosque
- Atik Mustafa Pasha Mosque
- Bodrum Mosque
- Eski Imaret Mosque
- Fenari Isa Mosque
- Hirami Ahmet Pasha Mosque
- Gül Mosque
- Hagia Sophia
- Chora Church now Kariye Mosque.
- Kalenderhane Mosque
- Kasım Agha Mosque
- Kefeli Mosque
- Koca Mustafa Pasha Mosque
- Little Hagia Sophia
- Pammakaristos Church
- Sancaktar Hayrettin Mosque
- Vefa Kilise Mosque
- Zeyrek Mosque

== Ottoman mosques ==
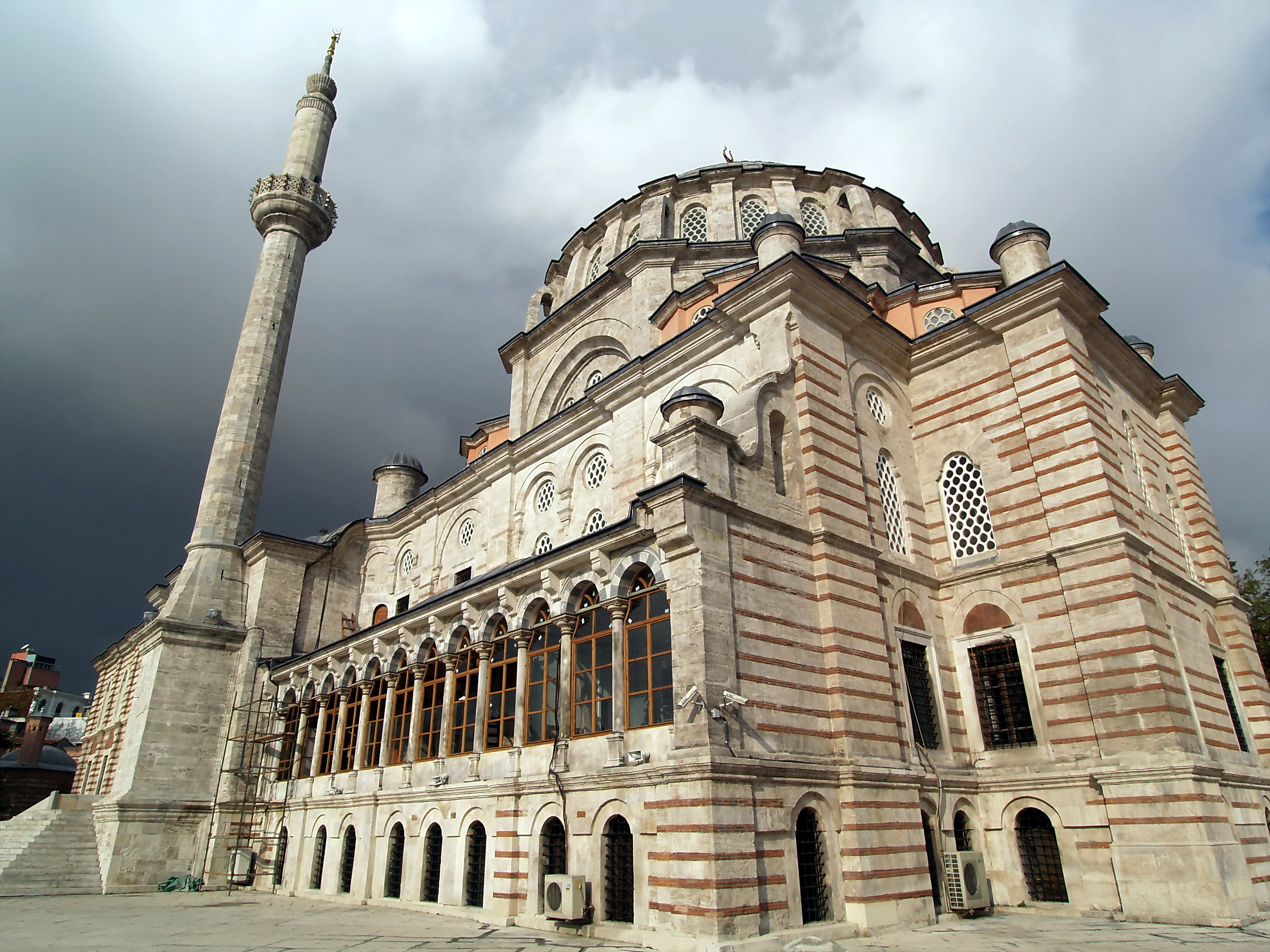
Laleli Mosque

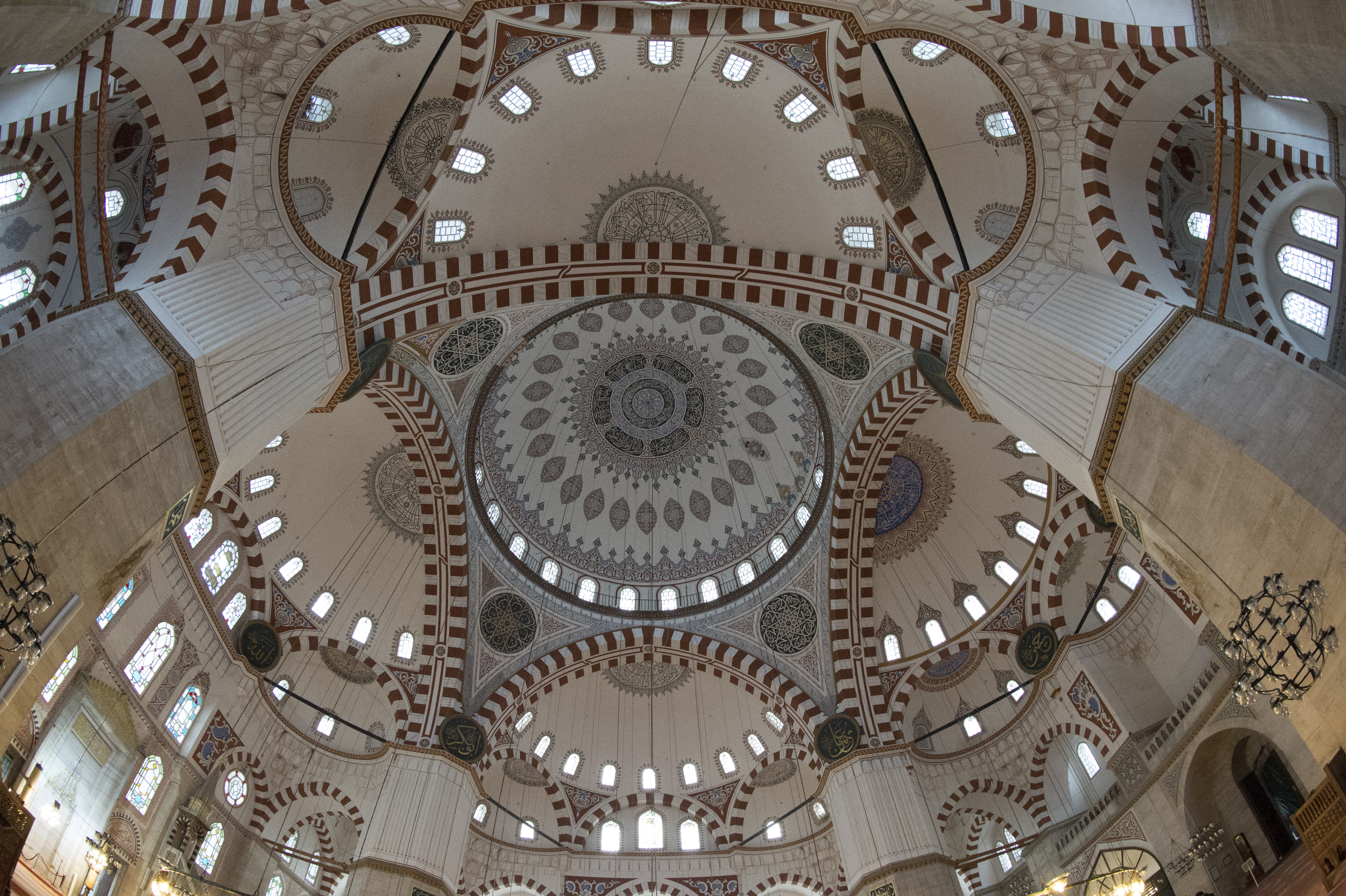
Dome of Şehzade Mosque

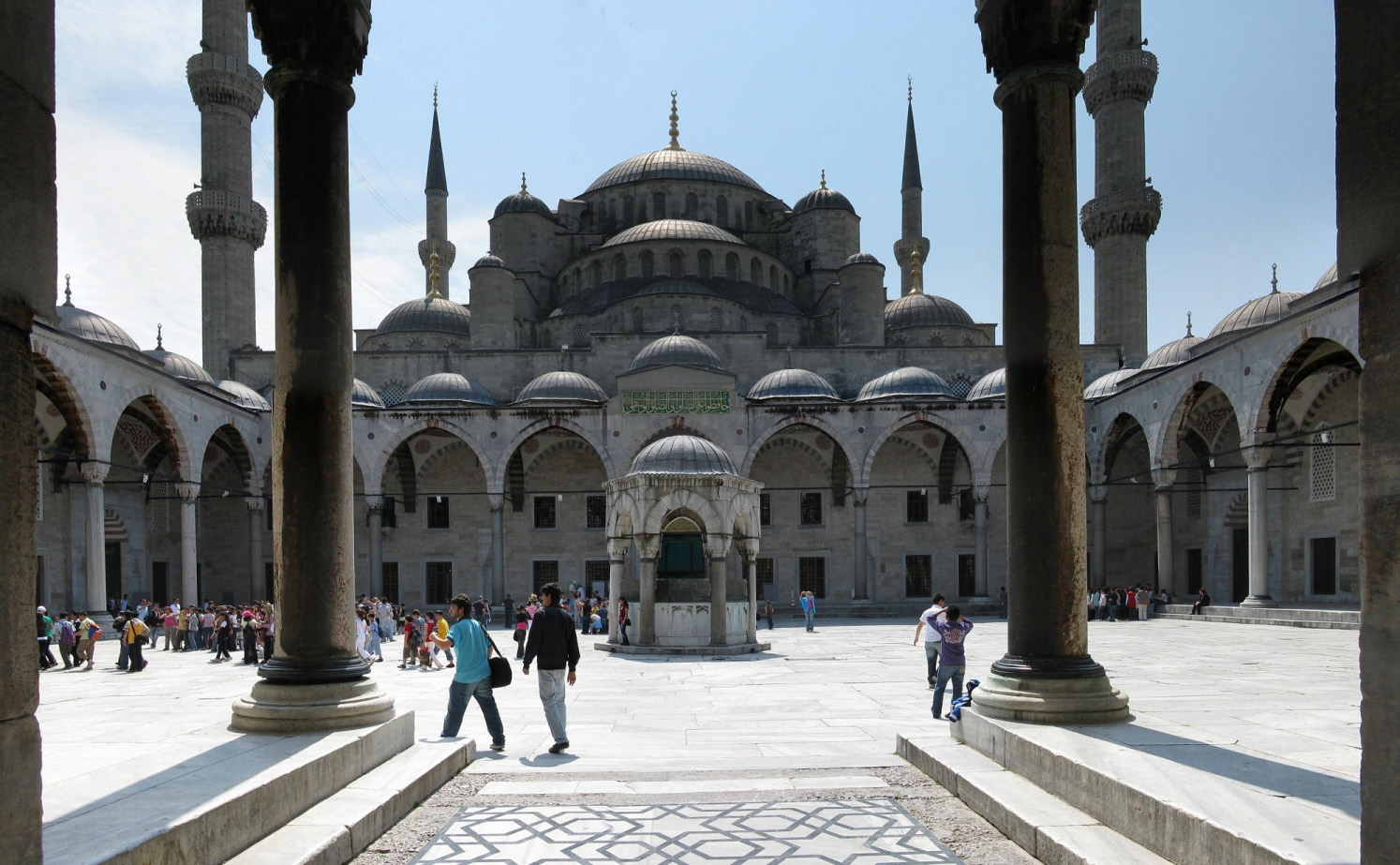
Sultan Ahmed Mosque (Blue Mosque) Courtyard

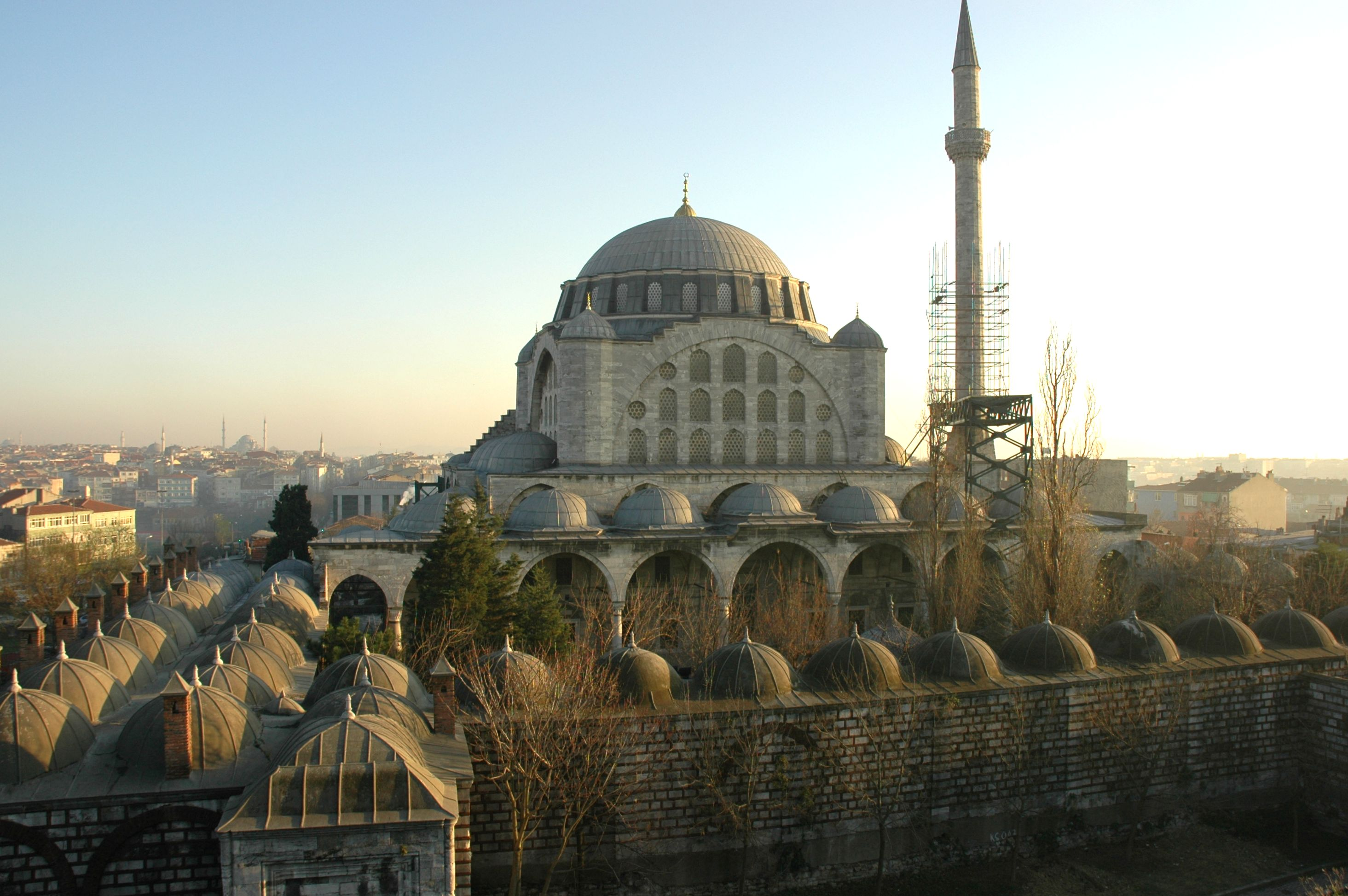
Mihrima Mosque

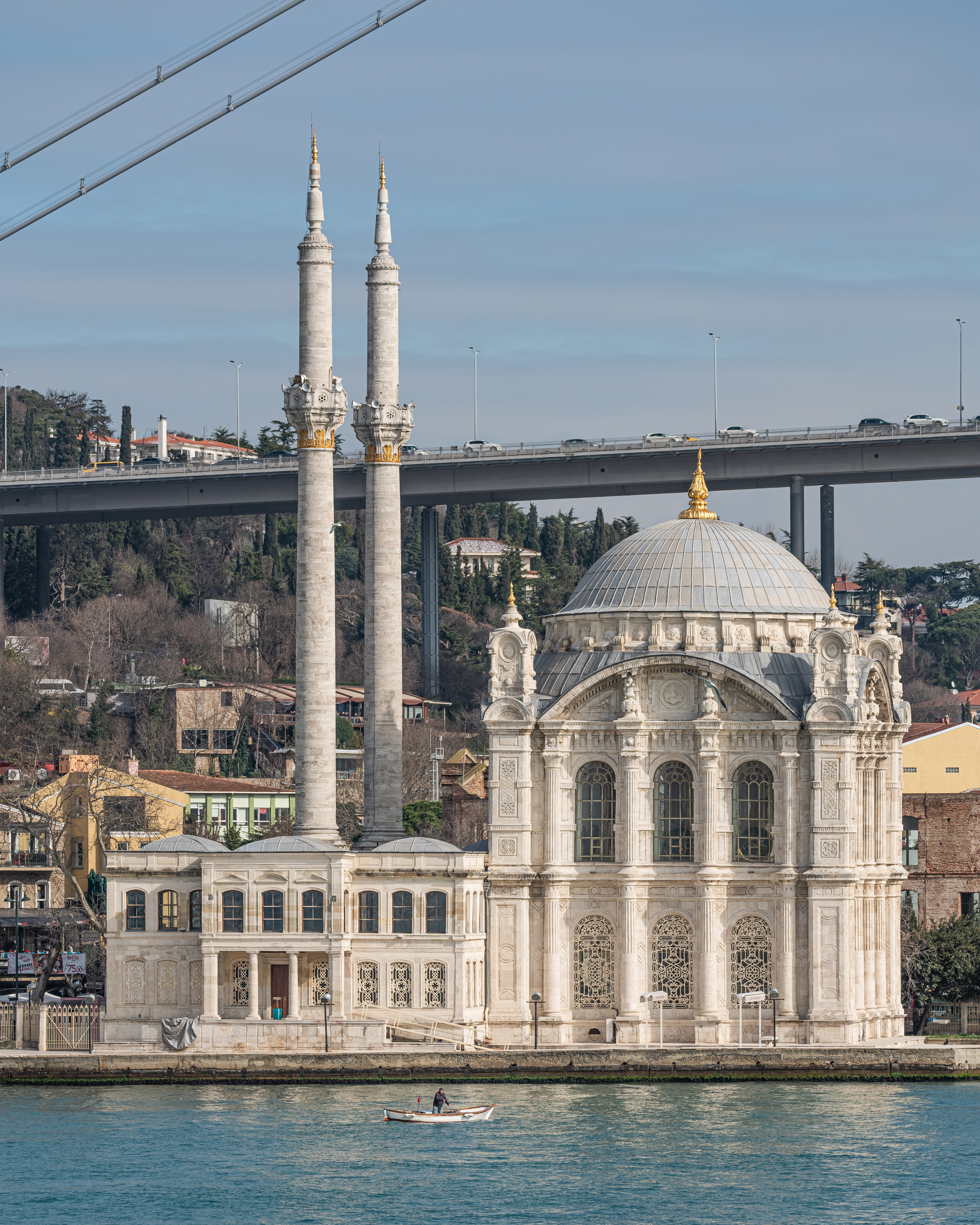
Ortaköy Mosque

- Eyüp Sultan Mosque, 1458
- Mahmut Pasha Mosque, Eminönü, 1463
- Fatih Mosque, 1470
- Murat Pasha Mosque, Aksaray, 1471
- Rum Mehmed Pasha Mosque, 1471
- Firuz Ağa Mosque, 1491
- Handan Agha Mosque, 15th century
- Bayezid II Mosque, 1506
- Yavuz Selim Mosque, 1527/28
- Piri Mehmed Pasha Mosque, 1530–31
- Haseki Sultan Mosque, 1539
- Defterdar Mosque, 1542
- Mihrimah Sultan Mosque (Üsküdar), 1548
- Şehzade Mosque, 1548
- Burmalı Mescit Mosque (Burmalı Mescit Camii), 1550
- Hadim Ibrahim Pasha Mosque, 1551
- Sinan Pasha Mosque (Istanbul), 1555
- Süleymaniye Mosque, 1558
- İskender Pasha Mosque, Kanlıca, 1560
- Rüstem Pasha Mosque, 1563
- Mihrimah Mosque, 1565
- Kara Ahmet Pasha Mosque, c. 1572
- Sokollu Mehmet Pasha Mosque, 1572
- Zal Mahmud Pasha Mosque, 1577
- Kılıç Ali Pasha Complex, 1580
- Şemsi Pasha Mosque, 1581
- Atik Valide Mosque, 1583
- Molla Çelebi Mosque, 1584
- Mesih Mehmed Pasha Mosque, 1585
- Kırmızı Minare Mosque, probably 1591
- İskender Pasha Mosque, Fatih, 15th or 16th centuries
- Blue Mosque, 1616
- New Mosque, 1665
- Yeni Valide Mosque, 1710
- Nuruosmaniye Mosque, 1755
- Zeynep Sultan Mosque, 1769
- Büyükdere Kara Mehmet Kethüda Mosque, 18th century
- Emirgan Mosque, 1781
- Laleli Mosque, 1783
- Teşvikiye Mosque, 1794
- Selimiye Mosque, Üsküdar, 1805
- Muhammad Maarifi Mosque, 1818
- Nusretiye Mosque, 1826
- Küçük Mecidiye Mosque, 1843
- Dolmabahçe Mosque, 1855
- Ortaköy Mosque, 1856
- Altunizade Mosque, 1865
- Pertevniyal Valide Sultan Mosque, 1872
- Yıldız Hamidiye Mosque, 1886
- Bebek Mosque, 1913

== Post-Ottoman mosques ==
- Şişli Mosque, 1949
- Şakirin Mosque, 2009
- Sancaklar Mosque, 2012
- Mimar Sinan Mosque, 2012
- Çamlıca Mosque, 2019
- Taksim Mosque, 2021
- Barbaros Hayrettin Pasha Mosque, 2023

== See also ==
- List of mosques in Turkey
- Islam in Turkey
