= Kasımpaşa, Beyoğlu =

Neighborhood in İstanbul, Türkiye

Coordinates: 41°03′N 28°59′E

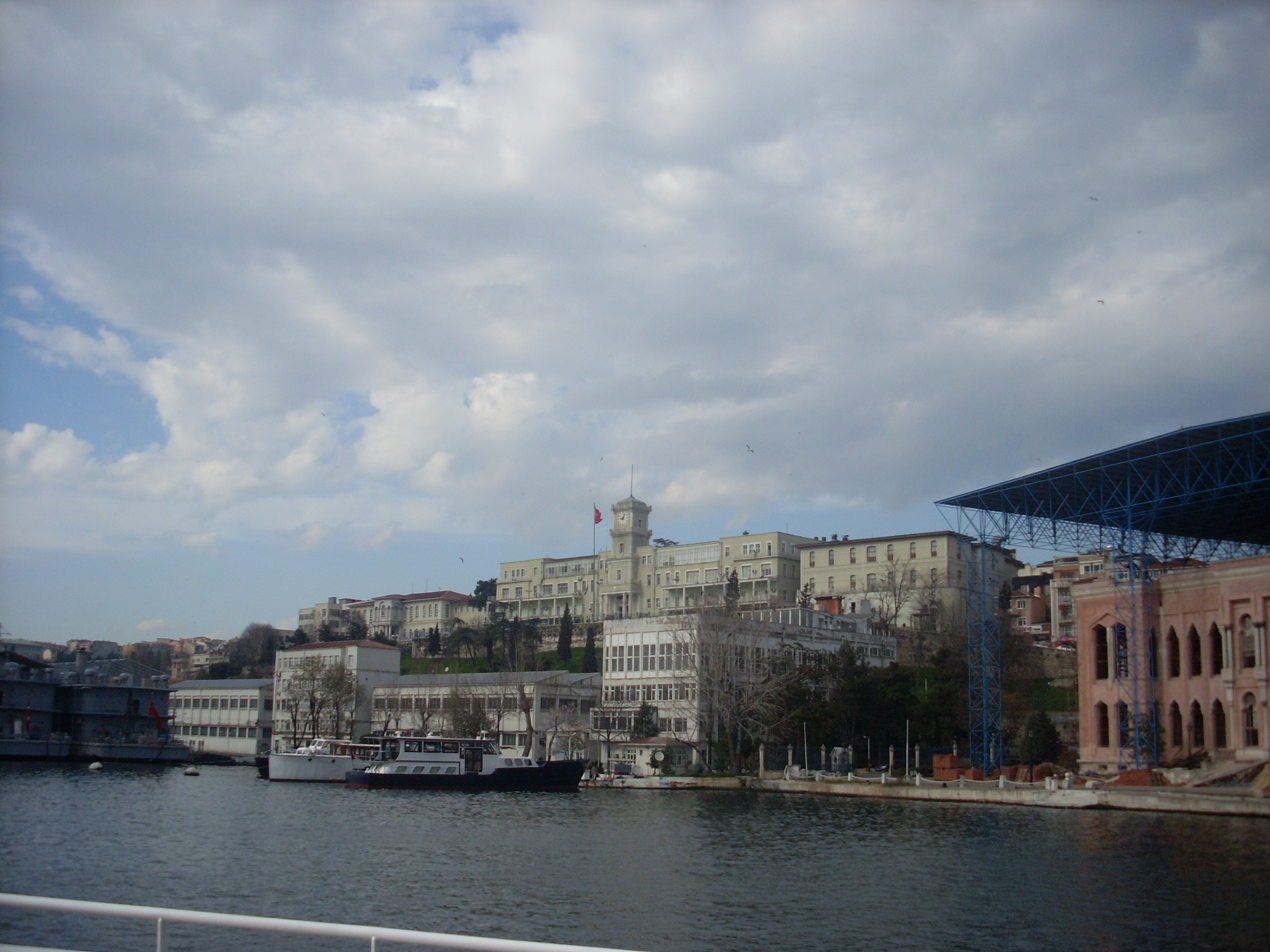
Kasımpaşa quarter of the Beyoğlu district in Istanbul, along the northern shoreline of the Golden Horn, with the buildings of the Ottoman Ministry of the Navy (right) and the Ottoman Naval Hospital (center), which are currently used by the Turkish Navy.

Kasımpaşa (Turkish pronunciation: [ˈkasɯmpaʃa]) is a working-class neighbourhood on the northern shore of the Golden Horn within the Beyoğlu district of Istanbul, Turkey, on the European side of the city. Once best known for its naval bases and shipyards, it is a rapidly evolving area, likely to be greatly changed by the Haliçport-Tersane Istanbul projects taking shape along its shoreline in 2022.

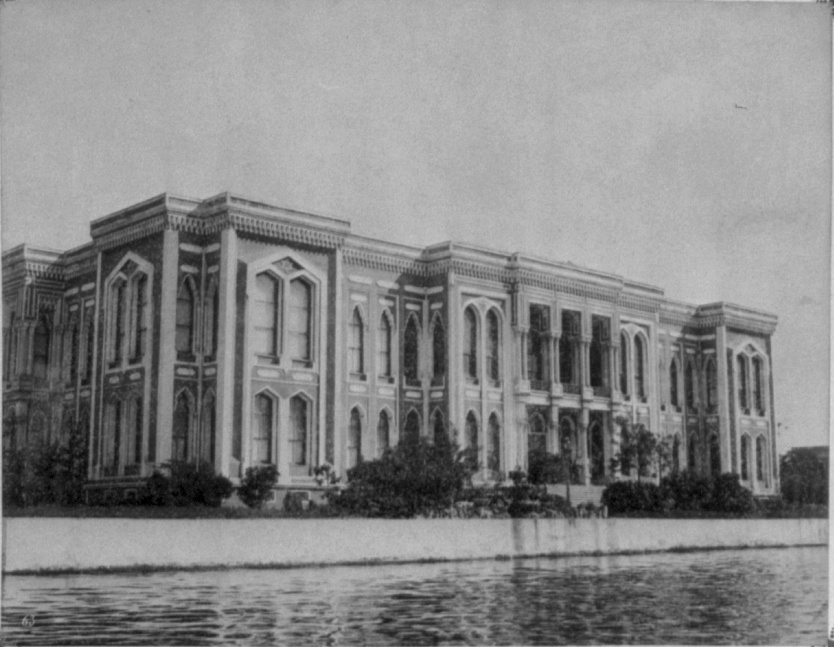
Ottoman Ministry of the Navy (Bahriye Nezareti) in the Kasımpaşa quarter is currently the headquarters of the Northern Sea Area Command (Kuzey Deniz Saha Komutanlığı) of the Turkish Navy.

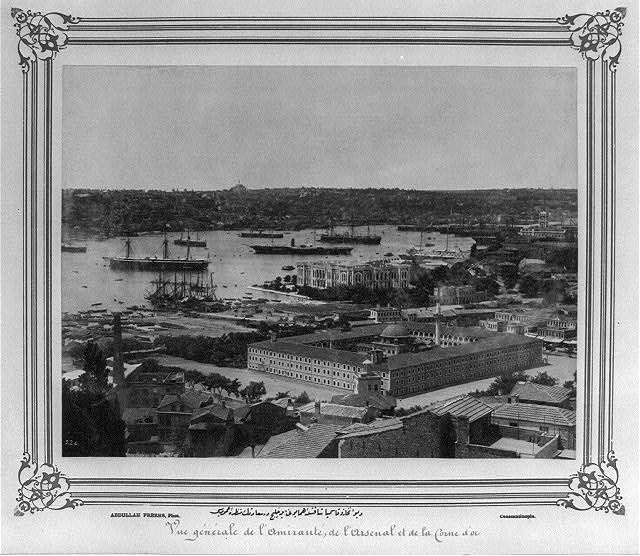
Kasımpaşa in the late 19th century.

Adjoining areas include Piyalepaşa, Hasköy and Şişhane to which it is connected by a Metro tunnel. Also nearby are Dolapdere and Kurtuluş which was founded, as Tatavla, by Greek from Chios who chose to leave their homes in Kasımpaşa for higher ground after their church was turned into a mosque. The Golden Horn ferry stops at Kasımpaşa connecting it with Üsküdar, Karaköy, Fener, Balat, Ayvansaray, Eyüp and Sütlüce.

Kasımpaşa is the lowest valued property on the Istanbul Monopoly board game.

== History ==
In 1453 Sultan Mehmed II succeeding in breaching the defences of the Golden Horn by having his ships pulled overland from near Dolmabahçe to what became Kasımpaşa where they could be relaunched into the water. He went on to capture Constantinople from the Byzantines.

Kasımpaşa takes its name from one of Suleyman the Magnificent's military leaders of the early 16th-century who was rewarded by being given the area after he seize Buda for the sultan in 1530. The area was soon developed to house the Imperial Arsenal and docks of the Ottoman Navy, home to 120 ships. At the time this was still a very green area and soon a wooden Tersane Sarayı (Shipyard Palace) was built here so that Sultan Ahmed I would have a place to rest when he travelled here to practise archery. The only trace of it now is the Aynalıkavak Kasrı building which is open to the public.

A Turkish Naval High School was founded here in 1773 to teach geometry and navigation to naval and civilian merchant captains on board a galleon anchored at Kasımpaşa. In 1785 Admiral Cezayirli Gazi Hasan Paşa had a huge barracks built here that survives to this day just inland from the Kasımpaşa ferry terminal.

In 1821, much of the Kasımpaşa quarter was destroyed by fire. The Turkish Naval Academy was housed here from 1838 to 1850.

As the Empire declined, the shipyard became neglected. Until the reign of Sultan Abdülaziz the Ottoman Navy still had 21 battleships and 173 other types of warship, making it the third largest navy in the world after the British and French ones. However, following the economic crisis of 1875 (which sparked the Great Eastern Crisis in the Balkan provinces of the Ottoman Empire) such a large navy became a drain on the Ottoman treasury.

In the 1860s the Ottoman-Venetian Jewish banker Abraham Salomon Camondo had a palace built for himself on the waterfront. This Kamondo Sarayı (Camondo Palace) was designed by the Ottoman-Armenian architect Sarkis Balyan. It went on to become the headquarters of the Ottoman Ministry for the Navy (Bahriye Nezareti), before becoming the headquarters of the Istanbul Naval Command on 14 November 1922 after the Armistice of Mudanya.

During the WWI, the area of Kasımpaşa suffered several times in 1918 because of the British bombings of İstanbul.

During the riots of 1955, Greek dwellings in Kasımpaşa were attacked and looted.

Until recently, the old arsenal still carried out ship repairs. However, in 2022 work on turning it into a cultural hub was well underway.

== Notable residents ==
Facing Kasımpaşa ferry terminal is a statue of an Ottoman dignitary with his pet lion at his side. This is Cezayiri (Algerian) Gazi Hasan Paşa, the 18th-century admiral responsible for building the Kalyoncu Kişlası (Kalyoncu Barracks) behind him in 1785.

The Ottoman banker Abraham Kamondo lived for some time in a waterside palace in Kasımpaşa.

Turkey's president, Recep Tayyip Erdoğan, was born in Kasımpaşa and attended the local İmam Hatip religious school.

== Modern Kasımpaşa ==
During the early years of the Republic, industrialisation of its shores rendered the Golden Horn very unattractive, and Kasimpasa itself was a solidly working-class neighbourhood and home, especially to sailors and people working in the shipyard. In the early 21st century, the Istanbul Metropolitan Municipality began investing in Kasımpaşa, building a new football stadium, sports complex, swimming pool, library and recreation facilities, with fitness and health facilities available to the public.

In 2022 work was underway to convert the 18th-century Kalyoncu Kışlası barracks complex into a new headquarters (Hükümet Konağı) for the Beyoğlu Municipality.

=== Haliçport-Tersane Istanbul ===
Much of the Golden Horn shoreline of Kasimpaşa is currently being converted into the Haliçport-Tersane Istanbul complex of shops, hotels and restaurants, partially reusing some of the old shipyard buildings and partly building new ones. A new marina forms part of the plans which also envisage the Sadberk Hanım Museum moving from its current location in Büyükdere on the Bosphorus to the shores of the Golden Horn where it will complement the

== Kasımpaşa Spor Football Club ==
The neighbourhood has become synonymous with the local football team Kasımpaşa Spor Kulübü, originally founded in 1921, which now plays in the Süper Lig. Its home matches take place in the 13,500 seat, multi-purpose Recep Tayyip Erdoğan Stadium, opened in 2005 and named after Turkish President Recep Tayyip Erdoğan.

== Local attractions ==
Aynalıkavak Kasrı is a pavilion in wooded grounds close to the shore of the Golden Horn. The only remaining piece of the early 17th-century Tersane Sarayı (Shipyard Palace) which had been greatly extended at the start of the 18th century, it contains a small museum of musical instruments.

The Güzelce Kasım Pasa Cami complex, also known as the Cami-i Kebir, in the centre of Kasımpaşa's shopping area, was originally designed by Mimar Sinan in 1533-34 but was completely rebuilt in the 19th century after a fire. In 2022 it was undergoing major restoration work. The Büyük Hamam (large bathhouse) attached to the mosque is still in service today.

Neither the historic Kalyoncu Kışlası barracks not the Bahriye Nezareti (naval headquarters) was open to the public in 2022.
