= Maalem Synagogue =

Synagogue in Istanbul, Turkey

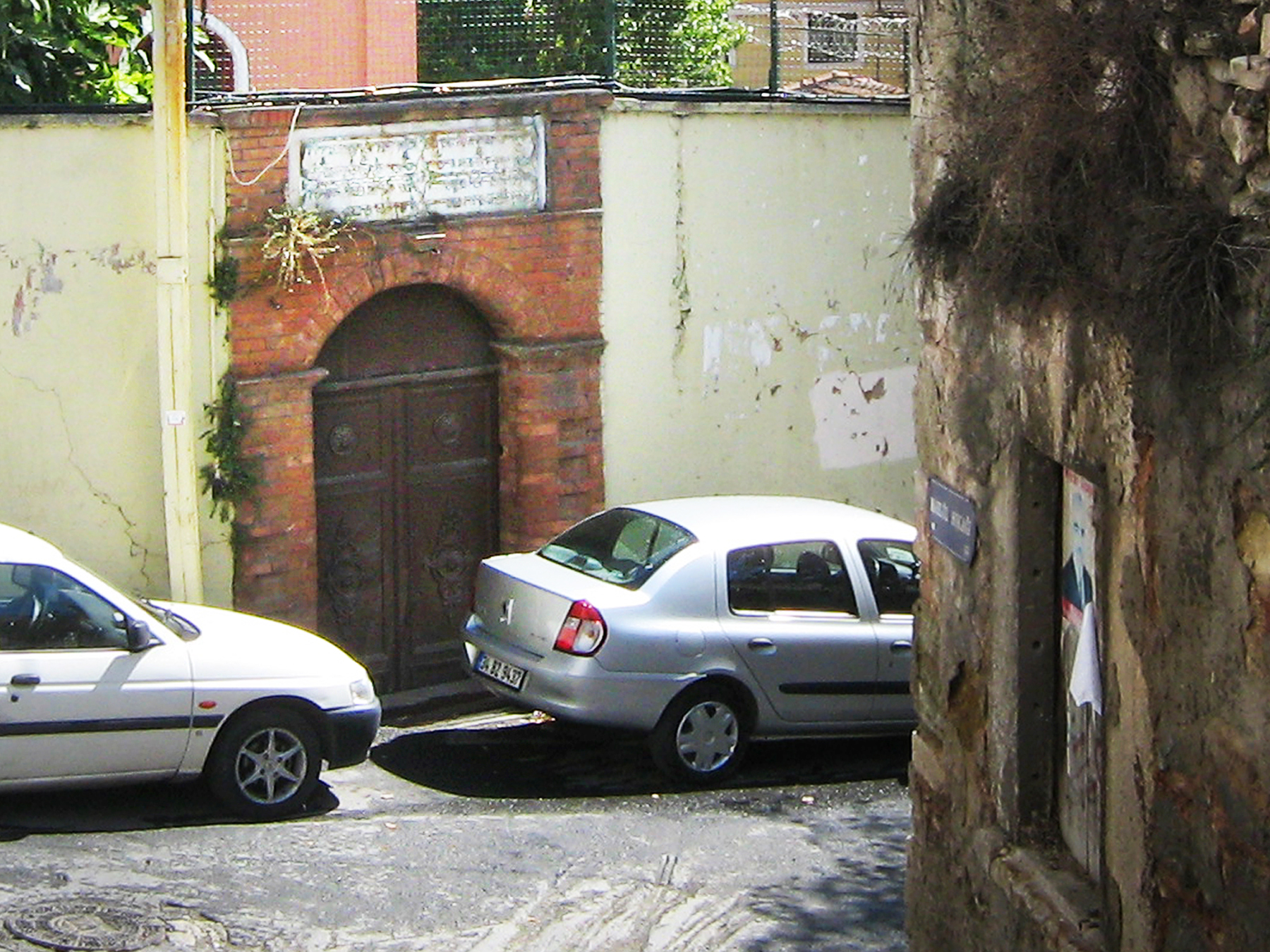
- The entrance to the synagogue, in 2009

- Location of the synagogue in Istanbul

Religion
- Affiliation: Judaism
- Rite: Nusach Sefard (Eastern)
- Ecclesiastical or organisational status: Synagogue
- Status: Active

Location
- Location: Harap Çeşme Street, Hasköy, Istanbul, Istanbul Province
- Country: Turkey
- Coordinates: 41°02′26″N 28°57′13″E

Architecture
- Type: Synagogue architecture
- Completed: 19th century
- Materials: Stone

The Maalem Synagogue is a Jewish congregation and synagogue, located on Harap Çeşme Street, on the slopes overlooking the Golden Horn, near the Jewish old age home in the Hasköy district of Istanbul, Turkey.

It is the only remaining open synagogue in an area that once had many Jewish residents. Completed in the early 20th century, the synagogue is open, yet only open for Shabbat services.

== See also ==
- History of the Jews in Turkey
- List of synagogues in Turkey
