= Handan Agha Mosque =

Mosque in Beyoğlu, Istanbul, Turkey

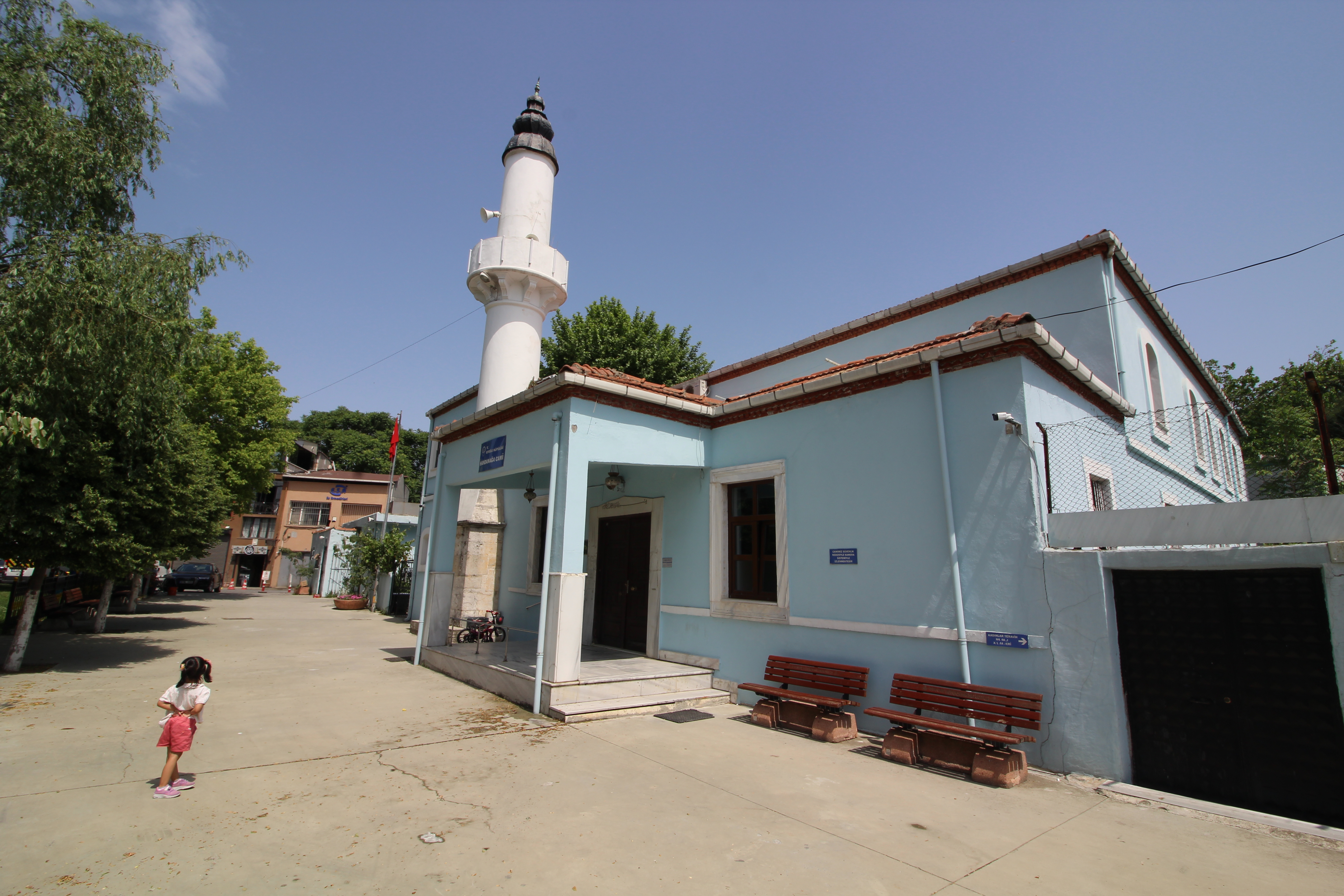

- Location within Istanbul

Religion
- Affiliation: Islam

Location
- Municipality: Beyoğlu, Istanbul
- Country: Turkey
- Interactive map of Handan Agha Mosque
- Coordinates: 41.0382°N 28.9511°E

Architecture
- Type: mosque
- Established: 15th century

Handan Agha Mosque is a mosque near the Golden Horn in the Hasköy neighborhood of Beyoğlu, Istanbul, Turkey. It is also known as the Kuşkonmaz or "Birds Don't Perch" Mosque. One of Sultan Mehmed II's aghas, Handan Agha, had it built in the 15th century. The interior is decorated with 16th- and 17th-century İznik tiles, with some maiolica tiles from the 19th century. The basement of the mosque was formerly a boathouse, until the coastline was filled for land reclamation. The mosque was repaired in the 18th and 19th centuries, and again in the 1960s.
