= Kâğıthane Creek =

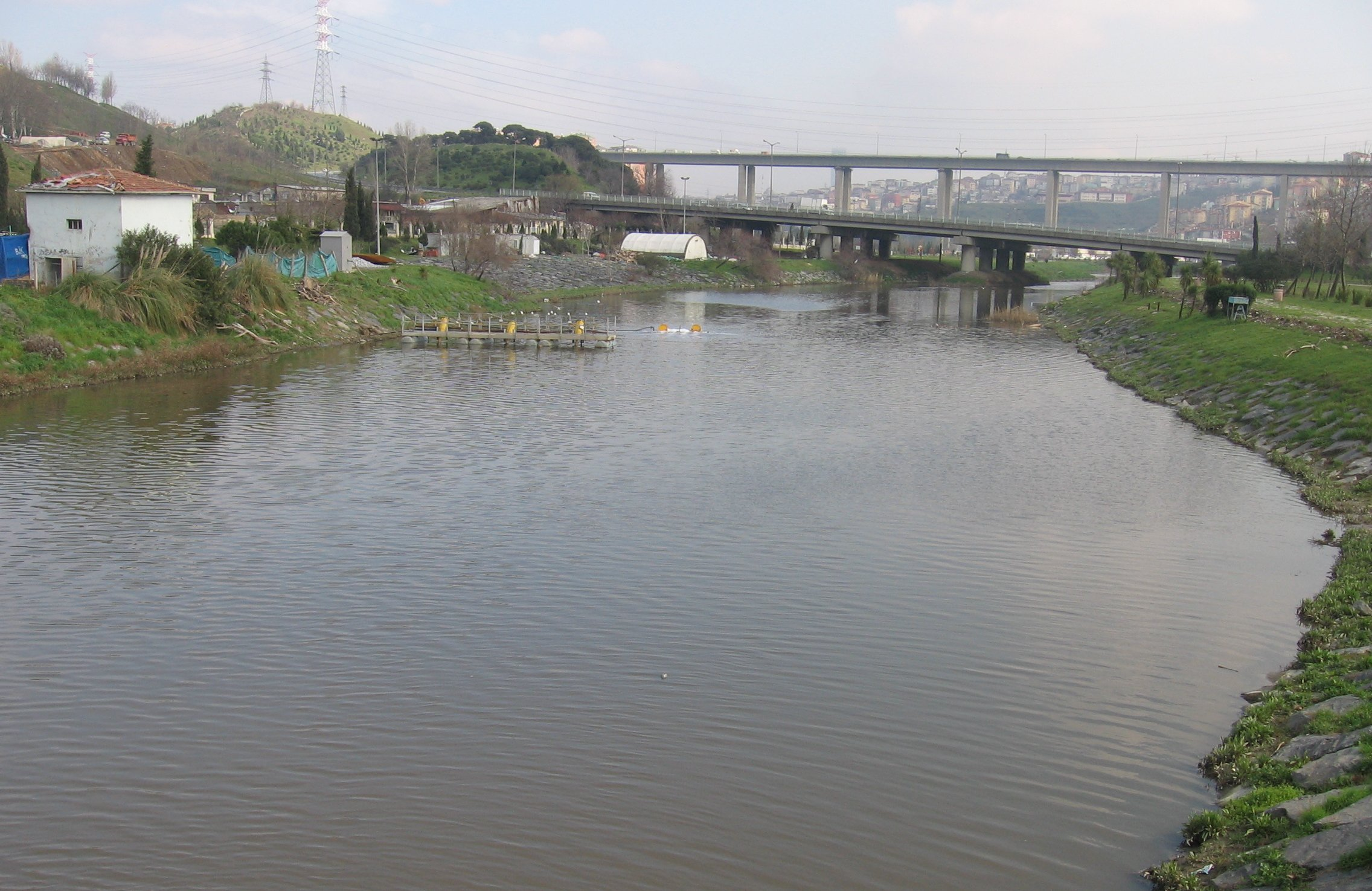
- Native name: Kâğıthane Deresi (Turkish)

Location
- Country: Turkey
- Province: Istanbul Province

Physical characteristics
- Mouth
  - coordinates: 41°03′47″N 28°56′50″E
- Length: 12 km (7.5 mi)

Kâğıthane Creek (Turkish: Kâğıthane Deresi) is a small river located in Istanbul. It originates from a source in the east of Lake Durusu. Eyüp passes through the districts of Şişli and pours into Haliç in Kâğıthane. It is rumored that the creek, known as "Barbisos" in the Byzantine period, started to be referred to as the Kâğıthane Creek due to the paper factory around it during the Ottoman period.

Today, the edges of the stream, which has a dense settlement around it, were covered with large meadows in the past. The horses belonging to the palace were grazed in these meadows. The creek was one of the main promenade places for the people of Istanbul. There were boat rides in it. The Ottoman traveler Evliya Çelebi talks about the Kâğıthane Creek with all these features in the section he describes Istanbul in his work Seyahatname.

In the period referred to as Tulip period in Ottoman history. Yirmisekiz Mehmed Çelebi built the similar mansions he saw during his European trips here. After this date, the meadows on the edges of the stream have become a place where the prominent residents of Istanbul are summer residences. However, all the pavilions and pavilions on the banks of the Kâpaperhane Creek were destroyed during the 1730 Patrona Halil. Kâpaperhane and its surroundings, which could not recapture their old glory later, faced intense internal migration to Istanbul after the 1950s. Slum-like settlements concentrated in the stream bed grew unplanned and evolved into today's neighborhoods.

Infrastructure shortage and crooked urbanization and wrong planning have created major problems for the creek. The stream, which is heavily polluted by the surrounding industrial establishments, also pollutes the Golden Horn and therefore Bosporus and Sea of Marmara; it smelled foul around. Since the creek was taken underground by covering it above ground, it carried it in rainy seasons and did not fit in its bed, causing great damage to the surrounding settlements. The stream, which was partially cleaned and rehabilitated through extensive works started in the 90s, was cleaned of bad odors spread to the environment.
