= Ayvansaray =

- Neighbourhood
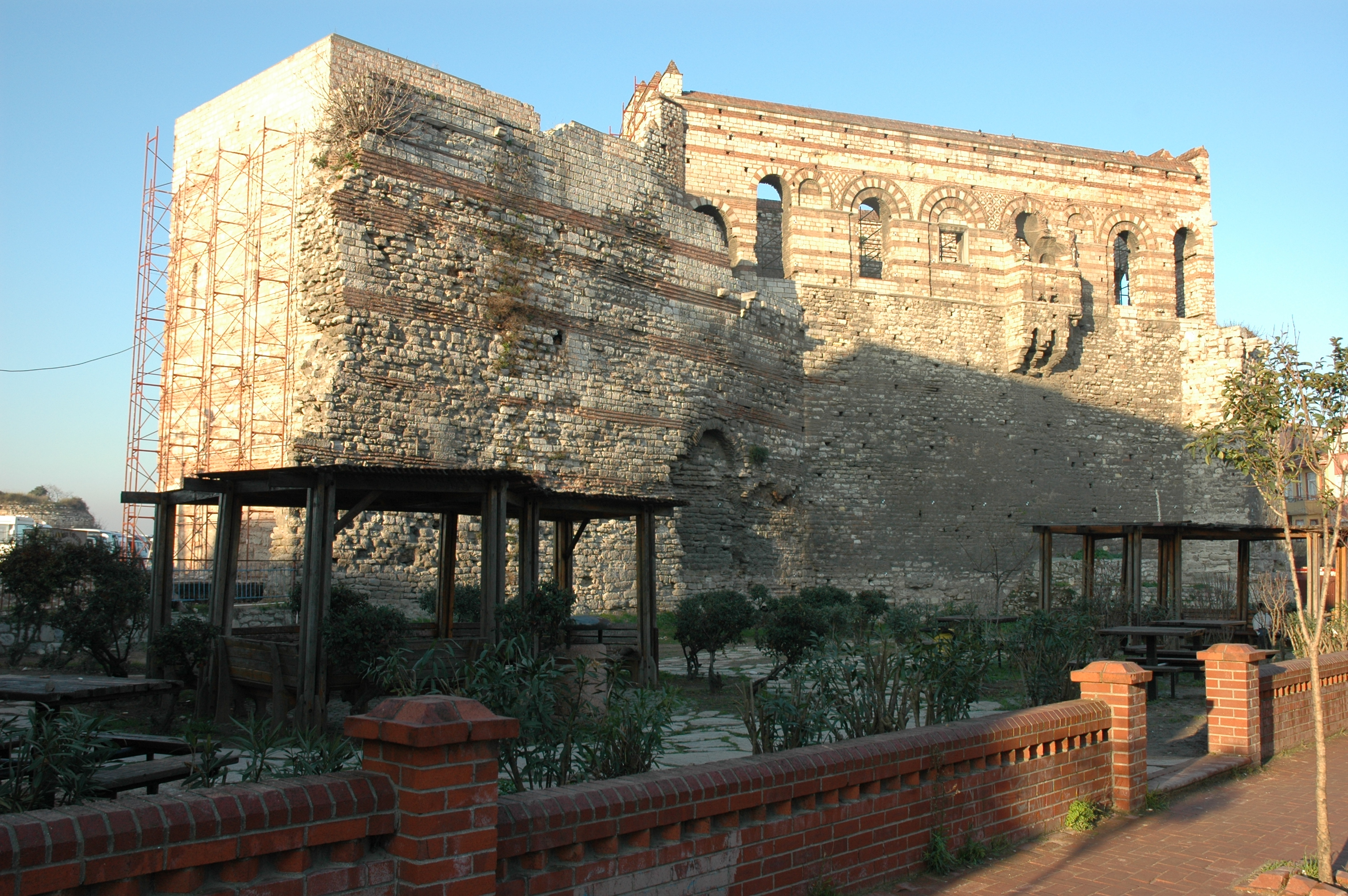
- Tekfur Palace in Ayvansaray

- Location within Turkey Location within Istanbul
- Coordinates: 41°02′18″N 28°56′33″E
- Country: Turkey
- Province: Istanbul
- District: Fatih
- Population (2022): 15,747
- Time zone: UTC+3 (TRT)

Ayvansaray is a picturesque neighbourhood in the municipality and district of Fatih, Istanbul Province, Turkey. Its population is 15,747 (2022). It is on the Golden Horn, between Balat and Eyüpsultan. It lies inside what was the walled city on Constantinople and later of İstanbul and corresponds to the old quarter of Blachernae (Vlachérnai in Greek).

The name Ayvansaray comes from the Persian ایوان‌سرای (Iwan + Saray) and probably means "Veranda Palace", a name that hearkens back to the Palace of Alexios I Komnenos (now lost), which was part of the complex of Blachernae.

The Golden Horn ferry stops at Ayvansaray, linking it to Üsküdar, Karaköy, Kasımpaşa, Fener, Balat, Hasköy, Sütlüce and Eyüp. The T5 tram also skirts Ayvansaray, linking it to the bus terminal at Alibeyköy (with services to Anatolia) and to Cibali.

== Attractions ==
Ayvansaray has a number of historic monuments including the Palace of the Porphyrogenitus (Tekfur Palace), the Mosque of Atik Mustafa Pasha (once thought to have been the medieval Byzantine church of Sts Peter and Mark), the Mosque of Kazasker İvaz Efendi and the small church of St. Mary of Blachernae which was built over an ayazma or holy spring. and has a particularly attractive garden.

The remains of the great Theodosian Land Walls run down to the Golden Horn, enclosing Ayvansaray behind three huge polygonal towers. Just inside this stretch of the walls is the small cemetery attached to the shrine of Ebu Şeybet-ül Hudri; in it are buried several companions of the Prophet Mohammed as well as Toklu İbrahim Dede who is believed to have taken part in the battle to capture Constantinople from the Byzantines in 1453.

During the WWI, the area suffered due to the British bombing of İstanbul in 1918.
