= Bombing of Constantinople in World War I =

1916–18 air raids on the Ottoman capital

Constantinople (Istanbul), the capital and largest city of the Ottoman Empire, was subjected to several air raids during World War I by British aircraft between 1916 and 1918. On 9 March 1916, three British planes on a reconnaissance mission flew above Istanbul and dropped a small amount of bombs. This was followed by an air raid on 12 April 1916, when two British planes, departing from the island of Imbros in the Aegean Sea, released a total of 11 incendiary devices on the aircraft hangars in Yeşilköy and on a munitions plant in Zeytinburnu. Propaganda leaflets were also disseminated over the city.

== History ==
In some of the strategic bombing raids in Istanbul, civilians were also killed or wounded, with damage to their properties. The British aircraft were deployed to positions in the aerial hinterland of Istanbul and the Turkish Straits, namely to the North Aegean Islands belonging to Greece, in particular Lemnos, Thasos and Imbros (the latter was a part of the Kingdom of Greece from 1913 to 1923, when it was ceded to Turkey), from where they would perform combat and bombing missions. Thus, the Minister of War, Enver Pasha, sent a threatening note to the United Kingdom for protesting the air strikes and civilian casualties.

The bombings led to the extension of an electric power line to the headquarters of the Ottoman Aviation Squadrons in Yeşilköy to speed up communication; to the transfer of more experienced pilots to the aviation squadrons; to the establishment of the İstanbul Muharebat-ı Havaiyye Komutanlığı (Istanbul Command of Air Defense); and to the acknowledgment by the Ottoman government that the danger was much greater than previously thought.

The government took measures to protect the civilian population from the bombing raids, but in many cases it failed; this led to increased government censorship of news reports about the casualties and public resentment. An effective reconnaissance network was created, which applied the following principle: whenever enemy aircraft approached, a blackout would darken the city, while the light of the projectors would track them for assisting anti-aircraft fire. The Ottoman 9th Aviation Squadron took responsibility for chasing and engaging enemy aircraft. This contributed to minimal damage to the city during July–August 1918. On 13 August 1918 the Ottoman government announced new directives aimed at the active protection of the population. Citizens were obliged to be more careful and to beware of espionage activities. The commission Tetkik-i Hasarat Komisyonu was created to help the civilians and restore their damaged property. According to British reports, while Istanbul was vulnerable to air strikes, the British were not able to create the "atmosphere of fear and panic" that they expected among the public.

During the war, the Ottoman cities of Trabzon, İzmir and Giresun were also bombarded.

== Chronology ==
Date	Air Force	Area	Victims	Notes
9 July 1917	two British planes	Istanbul from the west, İstinye	30 sailors killed, 10 injuries	The British wanted to destroy the aircraft hangars in Yeşilköy, to cause damage to the Ministry of War building in Beyazıt, and to sink the battlecruiser Yavuz Sultan Selim which was anchored at the naval facility in İstinye on the European shore of the Bosporus strait. Although the first two targets were bombed, the last one was missed.
9 March 1918	unknown	unknown	unknown	unknown
7 or 9 July 1918	five bombing raids	Zeytinburnu, the train station in Haydarpaşa, the Golden Horn, Selimiye, Davutpaşa Barracks, Gülhane Gardens	unknown	Instead of running away, civilians came out to the streets to see the falling bombs.
23 July 1918	seven British planes	Hasköy, Yeşilköy	injured people in Yeşilköy	Houses in Hasköy were damaged. The airstrike took place two months after Sultan Mehmed VI ascended the throne.
27 July 1918	two British planes	Istanbul Electric Factory, Tersane, Kağıthane, Galata Bridge	5 or 6 killed, many injured	Not reported in newspapers due to censorship.
20 August 1918	four bombs	Ayvansaray, Esirkapı, Fener, Beyazıt, Eyüp, Karagümrük, Yeşilköy	5 injuries	1 shop, 4 houses, and a wall were damaged, the attack lasted 15 minutes.
22 August 1918	nine bombs	Samatya, Beyazıt, Eyüp, Karagümrük, Pangaltı, Hasköy, Ayasofya	2 killed, 6 injured	One shop, two hamams, two walls, and 9 houses were damaged.
25 or 27 August 1918	unknown	unknown	1 child killed, 11 civilians injured	Propaganda brochures were also dropped.
26 August 1918	two planes	Bakırköy, Hasköy, Eyüp, Beyazıt, Eminönü, Unkapanı, Aksaray, Karagümrük	2 injuries	8 houses, one wall, one hotel, one coffeeshop and one inn were damaged.
27-28 August 1918	17 bombs	Hasköy, Kalenderhane, Üsküdar, Kasımpaşa, Bahriye Garden	3 killed 17 injured	12 houses, one hamam, one bakery shop and one wall were destroyed, a wounded British aviator was captured; in response the Ottomans launched an air attack on Thasos and Lemnos and destroyed three British aircraft.
13 September 1918	unknown	unknown	unknown	unknown
20-21 or 22–23 September	13 bombs	unsuccessful	none	The two planes were destroyed, a British pilot was captured.
18 October 1918	first wave - seven planes second wave - five planes	Beyazıt, Üsküdar, Eminönü, Galata, Unkapanı, Fatih, Samatya, Karaköy, Aksaray, Şehremini, Karagümrük, Fener, Kumkapı, Kasımpaşa, Eyüp, Hasköy, Pangaltı, Arnavutköy, Beyoğlu	50-70 civilians killed, 100-200 civilians injured	The most serious air strike. The Sultan sought refuge in a mosque, since he was exposed to the bombings while going to the Friday prayer.
25 October 1918	six British planes	unsuccessful	none	Captain Fazıl Bey from the 9th Squadron incapacitated a British reconnaissance aircraft.
