= Mayor Synagogue, Istanbul =

Former synagogue in Istanbul, Turkey

Mayor Synagogue
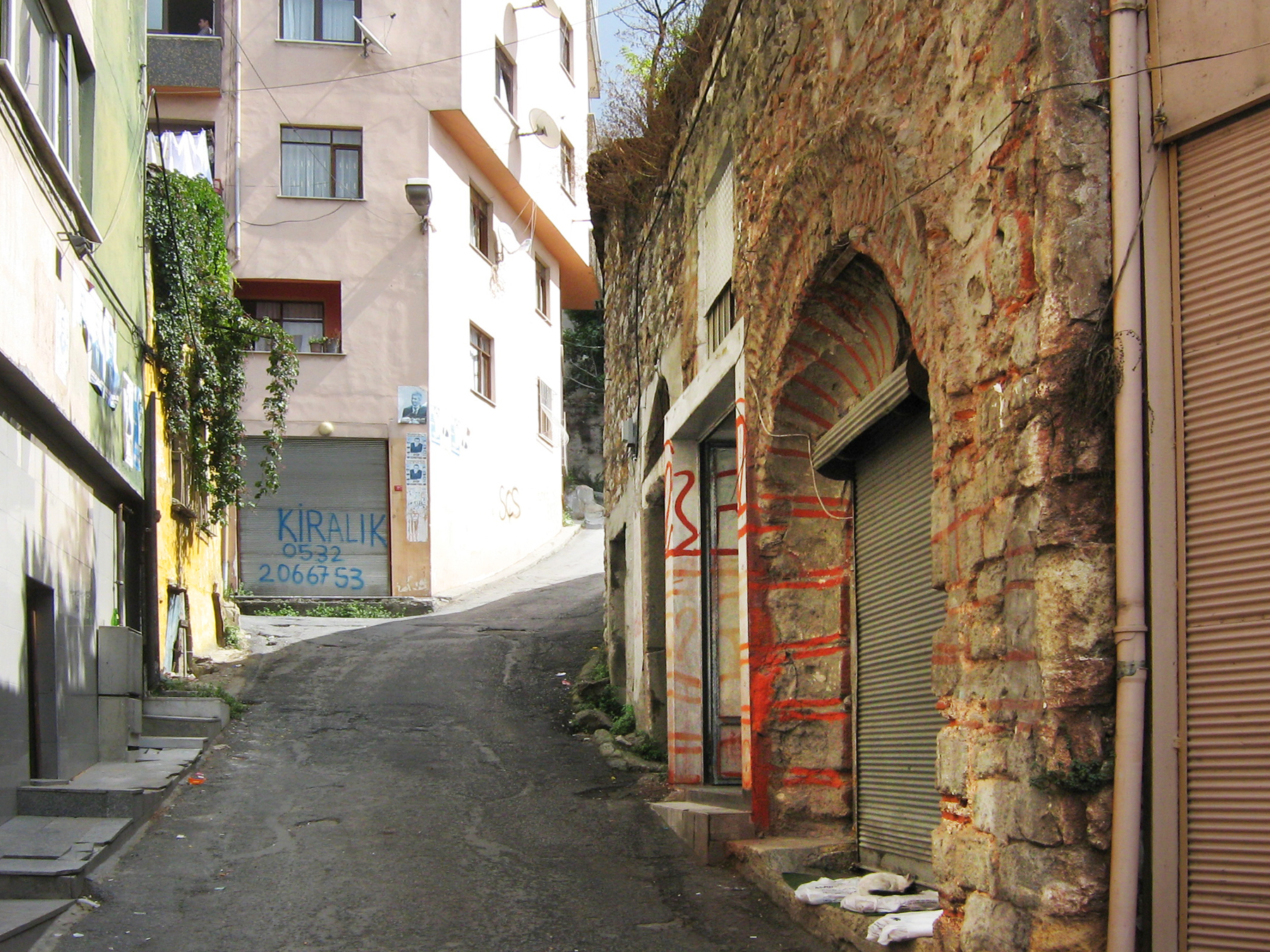
- The former synagogue, pictured right, in 2009

- Location of the former synagogue in Istanbul

Religion
- Affiliation: Judaism (former)
- Rite: Nusach Sefard
- Ecclesiastical or organizational status: Synagogue (19th century–c. 1923); Profane use (since c. 1923)
- Status: Inactive (as a synagogue); Repurposed

Location
- Location: Hasköy Avenue, Hasköy, Beyoğlu, Istanbul, Istanbul Province
- Country: Turkey
- Interactive map of Mayor Synagogue
- Coordinates: 41°02′23″N 28°57′05″E

Architecture
- Type: Synagogue architecture
- Style: Byzantine
- Completed: 19th century

Specifications
- Dome: One
- Materials: Stone

The Mayor Synagogue, also known as the Majorka Synagogue, is a former Jewish congregation and synagogue, located on Hasköy Avenue, in the Hasköy district of Beyoğlu, Istanbul, in the Istanbul Province of Turkey. Completed in the 19th century, the building was used as a synagogue until 1923.

== History ==
According to historian Lorans Tanatar Baruh, the synagogue was built in the Byzantine era and was called Mayor because it was the largest in the neighborhood. Another historian claims the synagogue was built 300 to 500 years ago by Jews from Majorca.

The synagogue building is now used as storage space, workshops, and a billiard parlor. In September 2009, artist Serge Spitzer chose this site for his installation Molecular Istanbul.

== See also ==
- History of the Jews in Turkey
- List of synagogues in Turkey
