= Hasköy, Beyoğlu =

Coordinates: 41°02′23″N 28°56′59″E

- Quarter
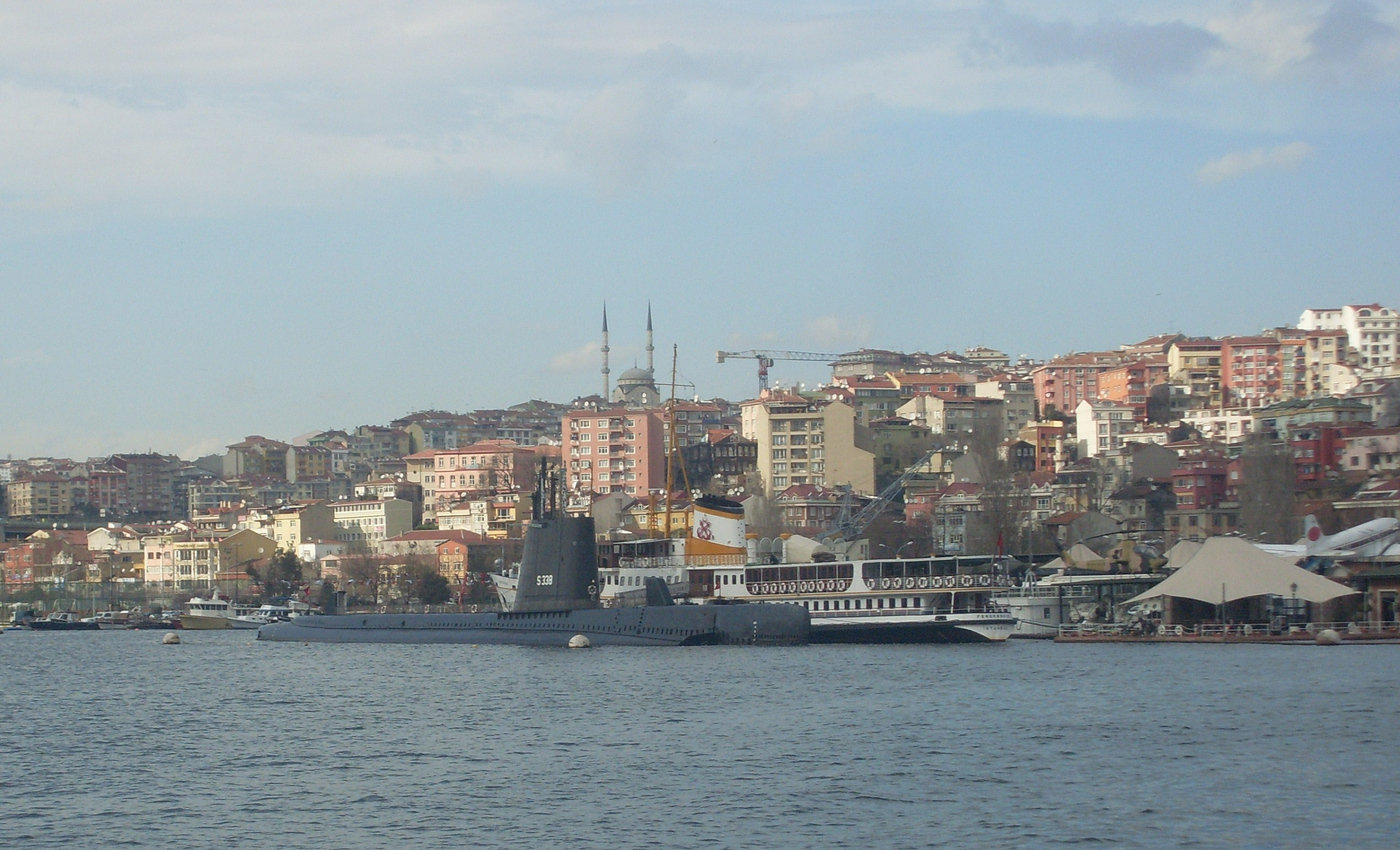
- View of Hasköy from the Golden Horn

- Location of Beyoğlu District in Istanbul
- Country: Turkey
- Province: Istanbul
- District: Beyoğlu
- Time zone: GMT +2
- Area code: (+90) 212

Hasköy is a trading and residential district on the northern bank of the Golden Horn in Beyoğlu, Istanbul, Turkey. It includes the neighbourhoods of Keçeci Piri, Piri Paşa, and Halıcıoğlu, and parts of Camiikebir and Sütlüce. Immediately to the south lies Kasımpaşa.

Hasköy means "imperial village" in Turkish, a reference to the pavilions and gardens belonging to the Ottoman sultan and his court that once lined the shore here. Armenian speakers knew it as Khasgiugh (Խասգիւղ), "khas" reflecting the older pronunciation of the Turkish word "has" and "giugh" being the Armenian word for village.

The Golden Horn ferry has a stop at Hasköy which links the district to Üsküdar, Karaköy, Kasımpaşa, Fener, Balat, Ayvansaray, Eyüp and Sütlüce. It is also linked by minibuses to the Metro stop at Şişhane. The E5 highway runs right across the northern edge of Hasköy.

== History ==
Formerly known as Picridion, In the late fifteenth century, Jews expelled from Spain and Portugal took refuge in the Ottoman Empire and many of them settled in Hasköy. In the late sixteenth century, the Jewish community of Eminönü, displaced by the construction of the New Mosque (Yeni Cami), also moved to Hasköy. The neighborhood also boasted many Armenian and Greek residents in the past.

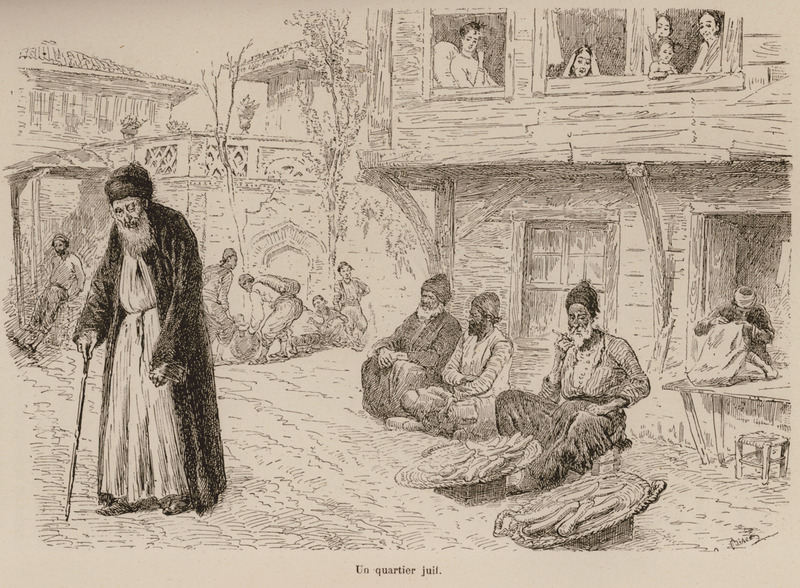
The Golden Horn: Kasskoj (Hasköy) or the Jewish ghetto, illustration by Cesare Biseo for the book Constantinople (1878) by Edmondo de Amicis

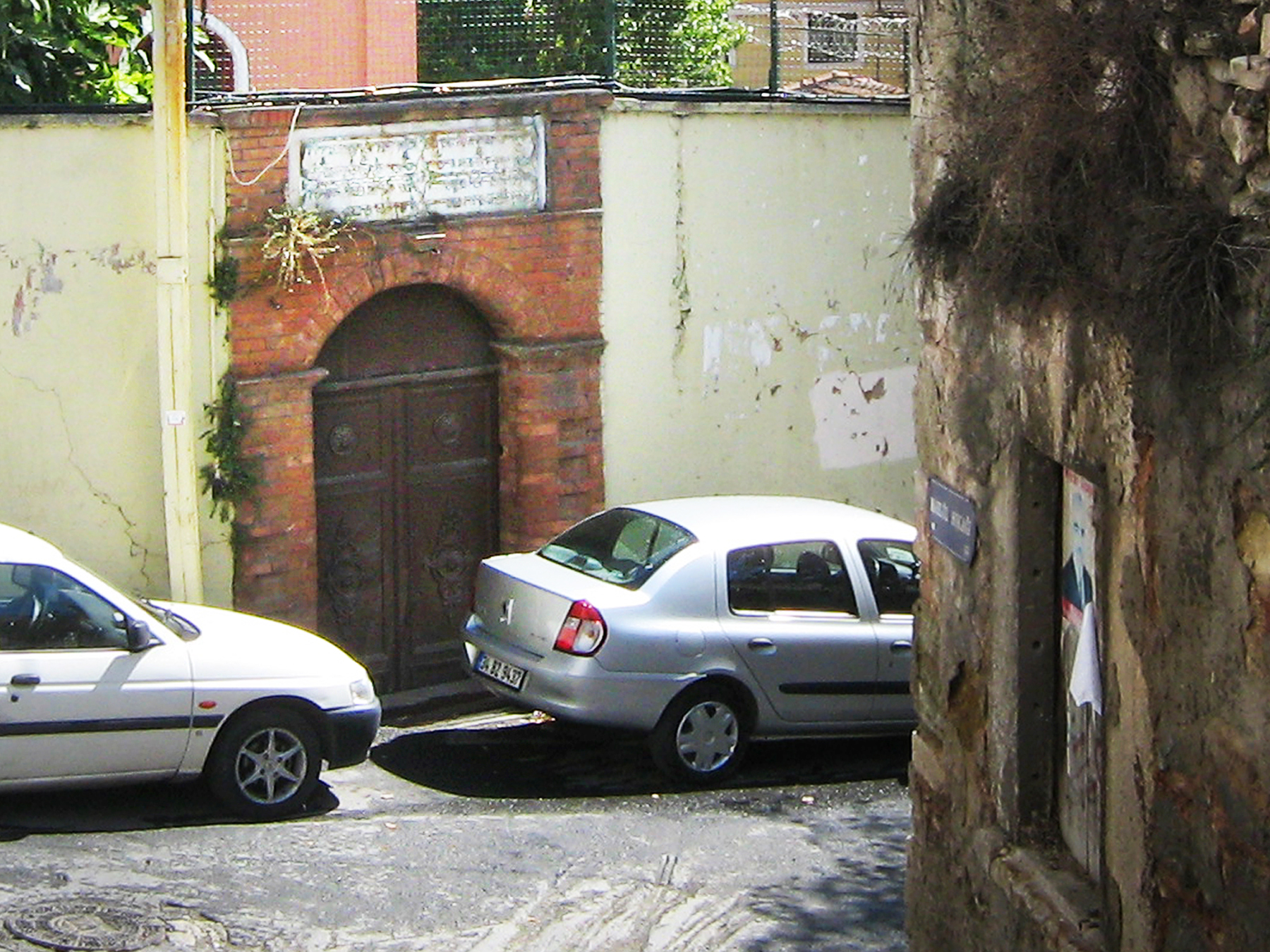
Entrance to the Maalem Synagogue

The large Jewish population meant that there were once several synagogues in Hasköy, serving the different communities. These included the Maalem Synagogue, the Abudara Synagogue, the Karaite Synagogue and the former Mayor Synagogue. None is currently active. The Esgher Synagogue has been turned into a cafe.

Istanbul's first Armenian theatre company was founded here in 1858. During the bombings of Istanbul by the British forces in 1918, the area was affected several times.

== Local attractions ==
The main local attractions open to the public are the Aynalıkavak Palace, the last remant of the old Ottoman Tersane (Shipyard) Palace, and the Rahmi M. Koç Museum, Turkey's first industrial museum housing an impressive on the history of transport, partially housed in a disused 19th-century shipyard and partially in a stone-built factory that used to manufacture anchors.

The St. Paraskevi Church currently serves the local Romanian Orthodox community.

The Surp Stepanos (Saint Stephen) Armenian Church was established by Armenian immigrants from Eğin. From 1852 to sometime in the 20th century, the Halıcıoğlu Armenian Protestant Church also offered services; while from 1889 to 1975, there was also a chapel attached to Hasköy's Kalfayan Orphanage, the Surp Asdvadzadzin (Saint Mary) Armenian Church.

Local mosques include the Handan Agha Mosque, and Kırmızı Minare Mosque.

Hasköy is home to several cemeteries including the Hasköy Muslim Cemetery, the Beyoğlu Greek Cemetery, the Turkish Karaite Congregation Cemetery, and the Hasköy Armenian Cemetery. The Hasköy Jewish Cemetery (Hasköy Musevi Mezarlığı), with gravestones in a number of different languages, contains the grave of Abraham Kamondo, a banker to the Ottoman court, who had a waterside palace in nearby Kasımpaşa. In April, 2011, the cemetery was desecrated by vandals who smashed several headstones in what appears to have been an act of anti-Semitism. Another act of destruction against dozens of Jewish graves happened in July 2022.

== Sports ==
Maccabi SK, a football team which represented the Jewish community was founded in Hasköy in 1913.

== Bibliography ==
- Deleon, Jak. Ancient Districts on the Golden Horn: Balat, Hasköy, Fener, Ayvansaray. Istanbul, n.d. ISBN 975-95392-1-7.
- (in Turkish) Hürel, Haldun. Semtleri, Mahalleri, Caddeleri ve Sokakları A'dan Z'ye İstanbul'un Alfabetik Öyküsü (An Alphabetical Story of Istanbul's Neighborhoods, Districts, Avenues and Streets from A to Z). İstanbul, 2008. ISBN 978-975-999-290-3.
- (in Turkish) İstanbul Büyükşehir Belediyesi. İstanbul Şehir Rehberi (A Guidebook to the City of Istanbul). Retrieved 10 October 2009.
- Tuğlacı, Pars. İstanbul Ermeni Kiliseleri = Armenian Churches of Istanbul = Istʻanpuli Hayotsʻ ekeghetsʻinerě. İstanbul, 1991. ISBN 975-7423-00-9.
