= Sütlüce, Beyoğlu =

Neighborhood in the Beyoğlu district of Istanbul, Turkey

Sütlüce
- Neighbourhood
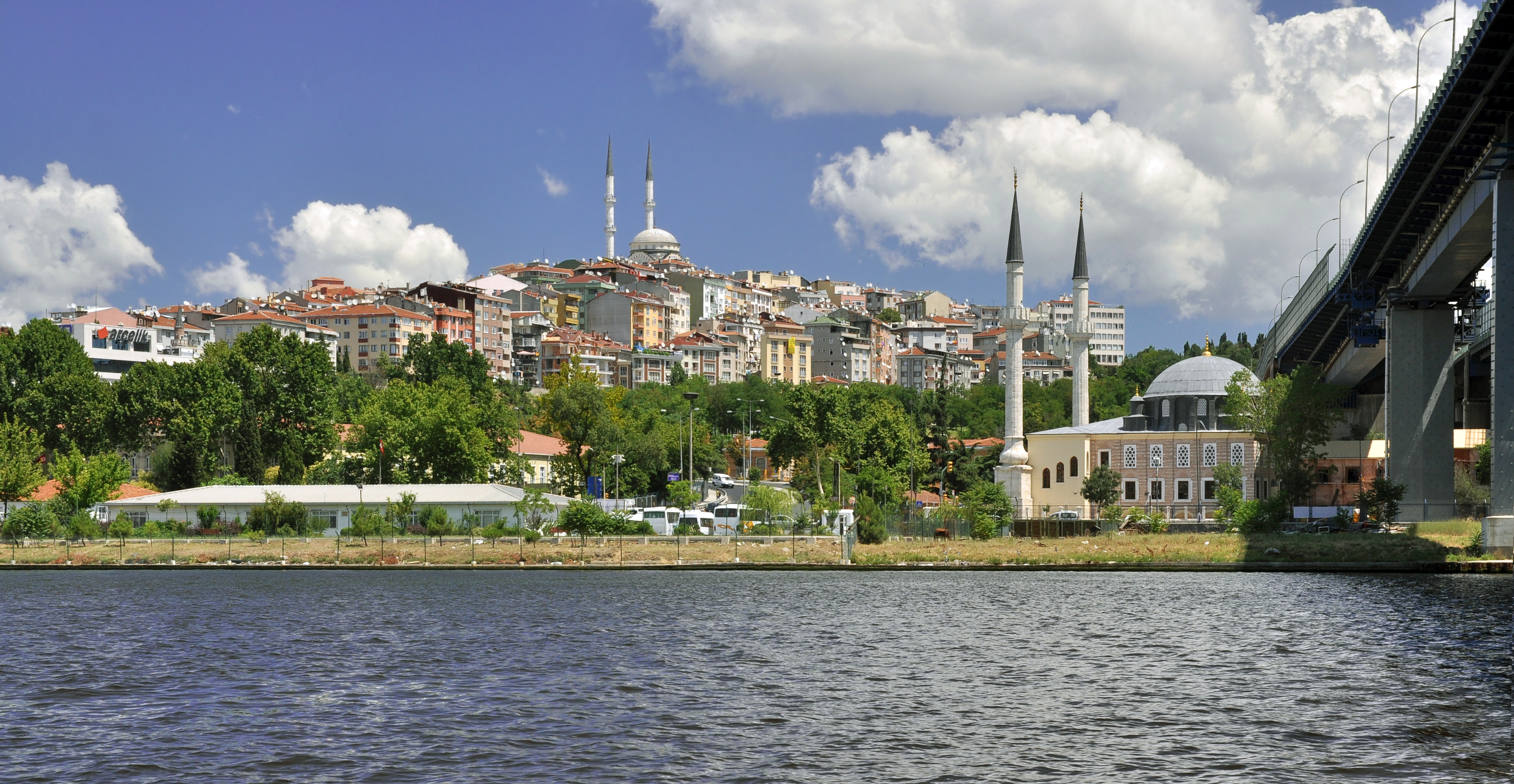
- View from Golden Horn to the european side of Istanbul with the Beyoğlu district and Haliç Köprüsü bridge

- Location within Turkey Location within Istanbul
- Coordinates: 41.05086°N 28.94014°E
- Country: Turkey
- Province: Istanbul
- District: Beyoğlu
- Population (2022): 12,736
- Time zone: UTC+3 (TRT)

Sütlüce is a neighbourhood in the municipality and district of Beyoğlu, Istanbul Province, Turkey. Its population is 12,736 (2022). It is on the eastern bank of the Golden Horn. It faces Eyüp, one of Istanbul's most holy sites, across the water. Immediately north of Sütlüce are Alibeyköy and Kağıthane, once, as the Sweet Waters of Europe, renowned beauty spots on two streams that flowed into the Golden Horn. Immediately to the south is Hasköy.

In the 19th and early 20th centuries Sütlüce suffered from the decision to turn what had once been a famously beautiful area into an industrial zone. Belatedly the first two decades of the 20th century saw it redeveloped with a touristic future in mind. Its most prominent monument is the waterside Halıc Conference Centre in front of which replicas of the old caiques that used to ply the Golden Horn wait to carry tourists across to Eyüp on the opposite shore. A modern promenade leads north to Miniaturk where many of Turkey's best-known attractions have been reproduced in miniature.

The Golden Horn ferry stops in Sütlüce, connecting it with Üsküdar, Karaköy, Fener, Balat, Ayvansaray, Hasköy and Eyüp.

== Halıç Conference Centre ==
In 1923 Istanbul's largest slaughterhouse was built on the shores of the Golden Horn according to plans drawn up by architects Osman Fitri and Marko Logos. Inevitably it caused considerable air and water pollution and was eventually closed down in 1984, reopening as the Haliç Conference Centre in 2009. Today it stands as a fine example of Turkey's First National Architecture style. Its attractive towers once served as ice-houses in the days before refrigeration.

The conversion of the slaughterhouse was financed by the Istanbul Municipality as part of a larger plan to improve the condition of the Golden Horn and turn it away from heavy industry and towards tourism. It has a fairground of 9,400 m^{2} (101,000 sq ft), a quayside of 8,250 m^{2} (88,800 sq ft) with a green space of 17,000 m^{2} (180,000 sq ft). The complex comprises a concert hall for 3,000 people, a theatre for 1,100 people, three movie theatres with a capacity of 800, 14 work halls and a restaurant that can seat 650 people.

The centre hosted around 30,000 delegates for the 5th World Water Forum between 16 and 20 March 2009.

== Education ==
Istanbul Commerce University and Haliç University both have campuses in Sütlüce.
