= Kırmızı Minare Mosque =

Mosque in Beyoğlu, Istanbul, Turkey

- Kırmızı Minare Camii
- Location within Istanbul

Religion
- Affiliation: Islam

Location
- Municipality: Beyoğlu, Istanbul
- Country: Turkey
- Coordinates: 41°02′31″N 28°57′03″E

Architecture
- Type: mosque
- Founder: Kiremitçi Ahmet Agha
- Established: 1591

The Kırmızı Minare Mosque (Turkish: Kırmızı Minare Camii; Red Minaret Mosque) is a mosque in the Hasköy neighborhood of Beyoğlu, Istanbul, Turkey. It was probably built in 1591 by Kiremitçi Ahmet Agha and so is also known as the Kiremitçi Ahmet Agha Mosque. It received the name "Red Minaret" because of its red brick minaret. The building was restored in 1889 and 1994.
