= Burmalı Mosque =

Mosque in Fatih, Istanbul, Turkey

Coordinates: 41.0146°N 28.9563°E

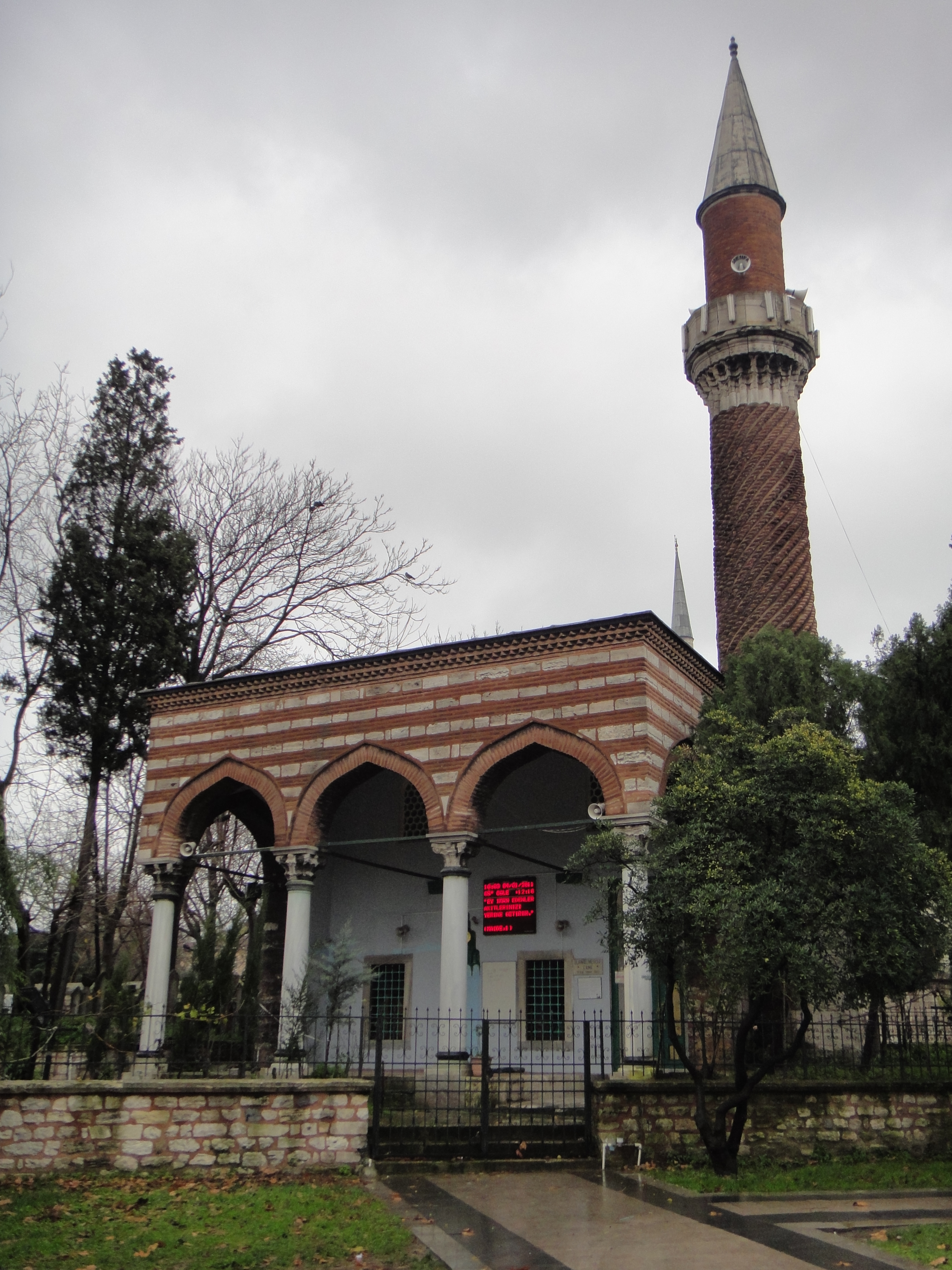

Religion
- Affiliation: Islam

Location
- Location: Istanbul, Turkey
- Interactive map of Burmalı Mosque

Architecture
- Type: Mosque
- Style: Islamic, Ottoman architecture
- Completed: 1550
- Minaret: 1

The Burmalı Mosque (Turkish: Burmalı Mescit or Burmalı Minare Camii; meaning "Mosque with the Spiral Minaret") is a 16th-century Ottoman mosque in Saraçhane park, Fatih district, Istanbul, Turkey.

Built in 1550 on behalf of Emin Nuretti Efendi, qadi 'asker of Egypt, it is named for its spiraling (burmalı) brick minaret, a copy of a Seljuq design that is unique in Istanbul. The mosque is not domed, but has a pitched porch, which rests on four reused Byzantine Corinthian stone columns. Unusually, the entrance is off-center behind a column. The mosque's interior is undistinguished.
