= Golden Horn =

Primary inlet of the Bosphorus in Istanbul, Turkey

Coordinates: 41°01′45″N 28°57′40″E

Map of Istanbul's Historic Peninsula (lower left), showing the location of the Golden Horn and Sarayburnu (Seraglio Point) in relation to Bosphorus strait, as well as historically significant sites (black), and various notable neighborhoods

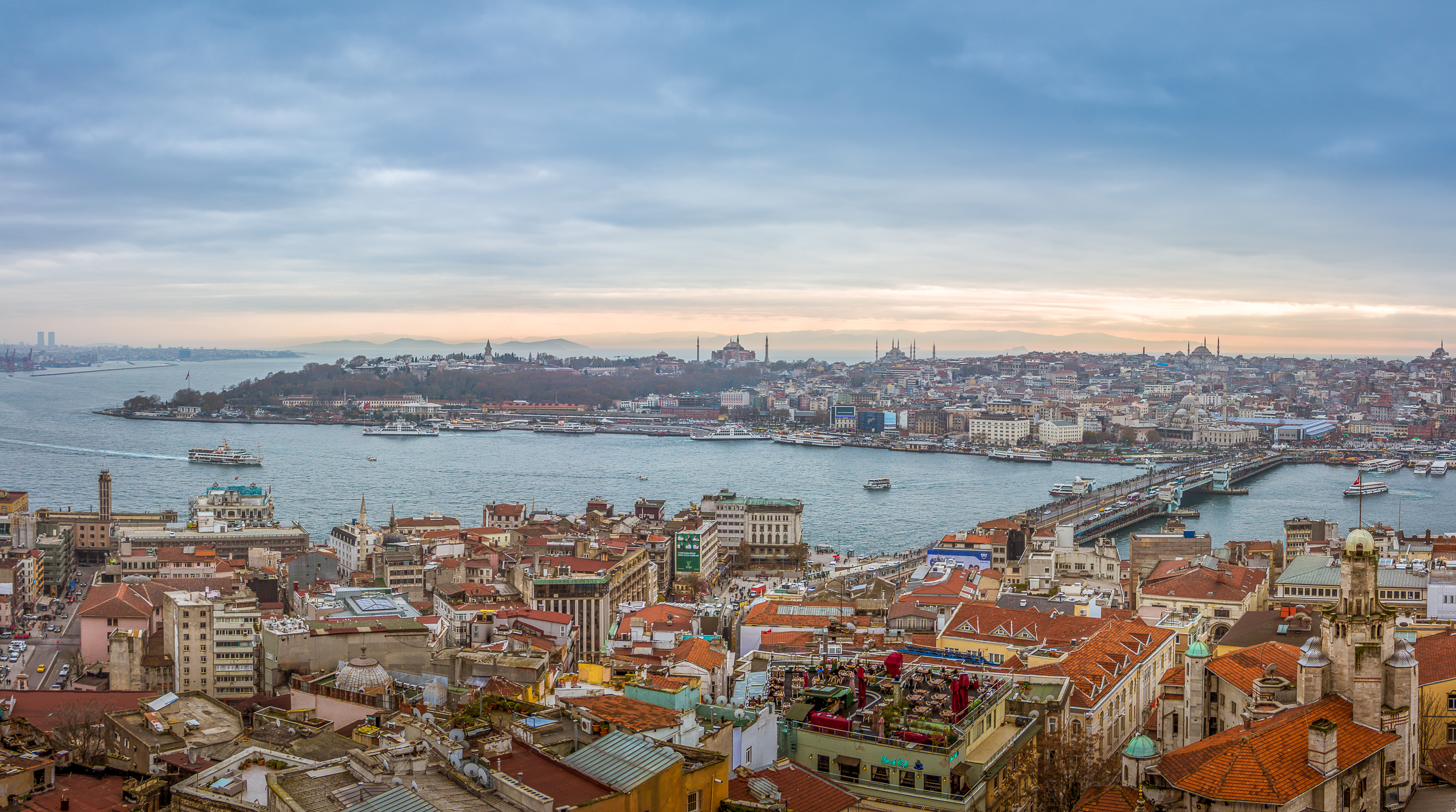
An aerial view of Galata (foreground), the Historic Peninsula (background), and the new Galata Bridge, which straddles the Golden Horn and, connects its two shores at the point where it meets the Bosphorus (off the picture, left) and the Sea of Marmara (behind the Historic Peninsula). Seraglio Point is located at the eastern tip of the Historic Peninsula (center, left). The Princes' Islands are along the horizon, at upper left.

The Golden Horn (Turkish: Altın Boynuz or Haliç) is a major urban waterway and the primary inlet of the Bosphorus in Istanbul, Turkey. The Golden Horn connects with the Bosphorus Strait at the point where the strait meets the Sea of Marmara. The waters of the Golden Horn help define the northern boundary of the peninsula constituting "Old Istanbul" (ancient Byzantium and Constantinople), the tip of which is the promontory of Sarayburnu, or Seraglio Point. This estuarial inlet geographically separates the historic center of Istanbul from the rest of the city, and forms a horn-shaped, sheltered harbor that has protected Greek, Roman, Byzantine, Ottoman and other maritime trade ships for thousands of years.

Throughout its history, the Golden Horn has witnessed many tumultuous historical incidents, and has been depicted in numerous works of art.

An hourly Golden Horn ferry service connects Üsküdar and Karaköy with most of the suburbs along the estuary. In 2021 the T5 tramline opened on the western shore of the Golden Horn. It runs from the Alibeyköy coach terminal to Eminönü where it intersects with the T1 tramline and several ferry services.

== Description ==
The Golden Horn is the estuary of the Alibey and Kağıthane Creeks. It is 7.5 kilometers (4.7 miles) long, and 750 meters (2,460 feet) across at its widest. Its maximum depth, where it flows into the Bosphorus, is about 35 meters (115 feet). While the reference to a "horn" is understood to refer to the inlet's aerial silhouette, the significance of the designation "golden" remains more obscure, with historians believing it to refer to either the riches brought into the city through the bustling historic harbor located along its shores, or to romantic artistic interpretations of the rich yellow light blazing upon the estuary's waters as the sun sets over the city. Its Greek and English names mean the same, while its Turkish name, Haliç, simply means "estuary", and derives from the Arabic word khaleej, meaning "gulf". The following districts line the western shore of the Golden Horn from south to north: Cibali, Fener, Balat, Ayvansaray, Eyüp, Silahtarağa, Sakarya and Alibeyköy. The following districts line the eastern shore of the Golden Horn from south to north: Kasımpaşa, Hasköy, and Sütlüce.

At present, the Golden Horn is spanned by four bridges. Moving from upstream to downstream (i.e. northwest to southeast), these are as follows:

1. Haliç Bridge, completed in 1974, which connects the neighborhoods of Sütlüce and Defterdar
2. Atatürk Bridge, aka Unkapanı Bridge, completed in 1940, which connects Kasımpaşa and Unkapanı
3. Golden Horn Metro Bridge, a pedestrianized railway crossing, completed in 2014, that extends subway line M2 of the Istanbul Metro across the Golden Horn
4. Galata Bridge (its fifth incarnation, completed in 1994), between Karaköy and Eminönü

The Eski Galata Bridge (literally, Old Galata Bridge), now-defunct, used to connect the downstream neighborhoods of Karaköy and Eminönü, but was disassembled and relocated upstream between Ayvansaray and Keçeci Piri following extensive damage in 1992 caused by a fire originating in the kitchen of one of the restaurants located on the bridge's lower level. Originally dating back to 1912, the now-retired structure is no longer used for vehicular or pedestrian traffic, but functions as a seasonal outdoor exhibit and event space attached to Haliç Park.

== History ==
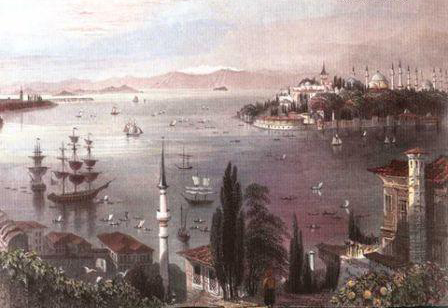
Seraglio Point from Pera, with the Bosphorus (left), the entrance of the Golden Horn (center and right), and the Sea of Marmara (distance) with the Princes' Islands on the horizon

Archaeological records show a significant urban presence on and around the Golden Horn dating back to at least the 7th century BC, with smaller settlements going as far back as 6700 BC as confirmed by recent discoveries of ancient ports, storage facilities, and fleets of trade ships unearthed during construction work for the Yenikapı subway station and the Marmaray tunnel project.

Indeed, the deep natural harbor provided by the Golden Horn has always been a major economic attraction and strategic military advantage for inhabitants of the area. Emperor Constantine I established Nova Roma (later Constantinople) on top of the existing city of Byzantium to capitalize on the same benefits, as did the founders of the previous settlement and its modern successor, Istanbul.

The Eastern Roman Empire had its naval headquarters there, and walls were built along the shoreline to protect the city of Constantinople from naval attacks.

=== The Great Chain of the Golden Horn ===
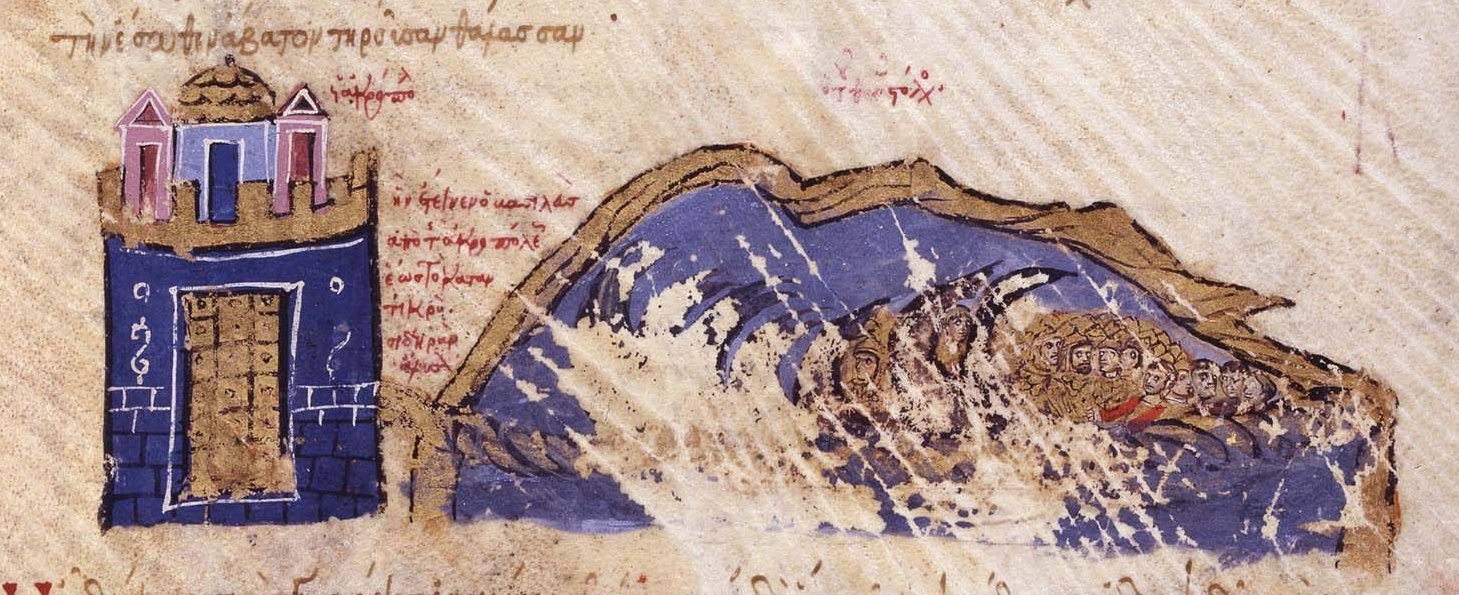
The iron chain preventing a fleet from entering the Golden Horn, depicted in the 12th century Madrid Skylitzes.

At the entrance to the Horn on the northern side, a large chain was pulled across from Constantinople to the old Tower of Galata to prevent unwanted ships from entering. Known among the Byzantines as the Megàlos Pyrgos (meaning "Great Tower" in Greek), this tower was largely destroyed by the Latin Crusaders during the Fourth Crusade in 1204. In 1348, the Genoese built a new tower nearby which they called Christea Turris (Tower of Christ), now called Galata Tower.

There were three notable times when the chain across the Horn was either broken or circumvented. In the 10th century the Kievan Rus' dragged their longships out of the Bosphorus, around Galata, and relaunched them in the Horn; the Byzantines defeated them with Greek fire. In 1204, during the Fourth Crusade, Venetian ships were able to break the chain with a ram. In 1453, Ottoman Sultan Mehmed II, having failed in his attempt to break the chain with brute force, instead used the same tactic as the Rus'; towing his ships across Galata over greased logs and into the estuary.

After the Ottoman conquest of Constantinople in 1453, Mehmed II resettled ethnic Greeks along the Horn in the Phanar (today's Fener). Balat continued to be inhabited by Jews, as during the Byzantine age, though many Jews decided to leave following the takeover of the city. This area was repopulated when Bayezid II invited the Jews who were expelled from Spain to resettle in Balat.

In 1502, Leonardo da Vinci produced a drawing of a single-span 240-metre (790 ft) bridge over the Golden Horn as part of a civil engineering project for Sultan Bayezid II. Leonardo's drawings and notes regarding this bridge are currently displayed at the Museo della Scienza e della Tecnologia in Milan, Italy. While the original design was never executed, the vision of Leonardo's Golden Horn Bridge was resurrected in 2001, when a small footbridge based on Leonardo's design was constructed near Ås in Norway by Vebjørn Sand.

During World War 1, the area was bombed by the British forces in 1918.

Until the 1980s, the Horn was polluted with industrial waste from the factories, warehouses, and shipyards along its shores. It has since been cleaned, and the local fish, wildlife, and flora have been largely restored. The clean-up happened in two main phases under Mayor Bedrettin Dalan in the 1980s and under Mayor Recep Tayyip Erdoğan in the 1990s.

Nowadays, the Golden Horn is settled on both sides, and there are parks along each shore. The Istanbul Chamber of Commerce is also located along the shore, as are several Muslim, Jewish and Christian cemeteries. Other institutions along the Horn's banks include museums, congress and cultural halls, supporting facilities of the Turkish Navy, and campuses of various universities.

Today, the Horn's history and natural environment make it a popular tourist attraction in Istanbul, visited by 10 million international vacationers annually.

== Tersane Istanbul ==
Sometimes claimed as the oldest shipyard in the world, the Haliç Shipyard (Haliç Tersanesi in Turkish) was founded by Sultan Mehmed II in 1455. It remained in operation both for shipbuilding and repairs into the 1960s but then fell into disrepair. The site is now being redeveloped as the giant Tersane Istanbul project which will bring hotels, museums, art galleries, shops and restaurants to a very rundown area. In February 2019 President Erdoğan announced the start of the project and in October 2021 it started to open when the Contemporary Istanbul art fair was staged there. It is intended that the Sadberk Hanım Museum will relocate to Tersane Istanbul from Sarıyer as part of the project.

== In popular culture ==
The Golden Horn is featured in many works of literature dealing with classical themes. For example, G. K. Chesterton's poem Lepanto contains the memorable couplet "From evening isles fantastical rings faint the Spanish gun, / And the Lord upon the Golden Horn is laughing in the sun."

== Industrial heritage ==
The Golden Horn area has undergone significant urban transformation in recent decades. Historically known as an important harbor and industrial zone during the Byzantine and Ottoman periods, many of the factories and shipyards along the shoreline declined during the late twentieth century.

The transformation of the Golden Horn also included the adaptive reuse of industrial sites along its shoreline, particularly in neighborhoods such as Cibali. One of the most notable examples is the Cibali Tobacco Factory, originally established in 1884 during the late Ottoman period. In addition to its role as a major tobacco production facility, the factory became an important center of labor, employing a significant number of women workers.

This aspect highlights a lesser-documented dimension of the Golden Horn’s industrial history, where female labor played a visible role in urban production processes. The participation of women in such environments contributed not only to the local economy but also to broader social changes in Istanbul during the late nineteenth and early twentieth centuries.

Following the decline of industrial activity in the late twentieth century, the site underwent restoration and was repurposed for educational use. Today, it serves as part of Kadir Has University, reflecting a broader trend in which former industrial structures along the Golden Horn have been integrated into the contemporary urban and cultural fabric.

In response, several urban renewal and environmental restoration projects were initiated to improve the water quality and redevelop the surrounding neighborhoods. Parks, walking paths, and cultural spaces have been created along the coastline, contributing to the revitalization of the area and making the Golden Horn an important recreational and cultural destination in modern Istanbul.

== Image gallery ==
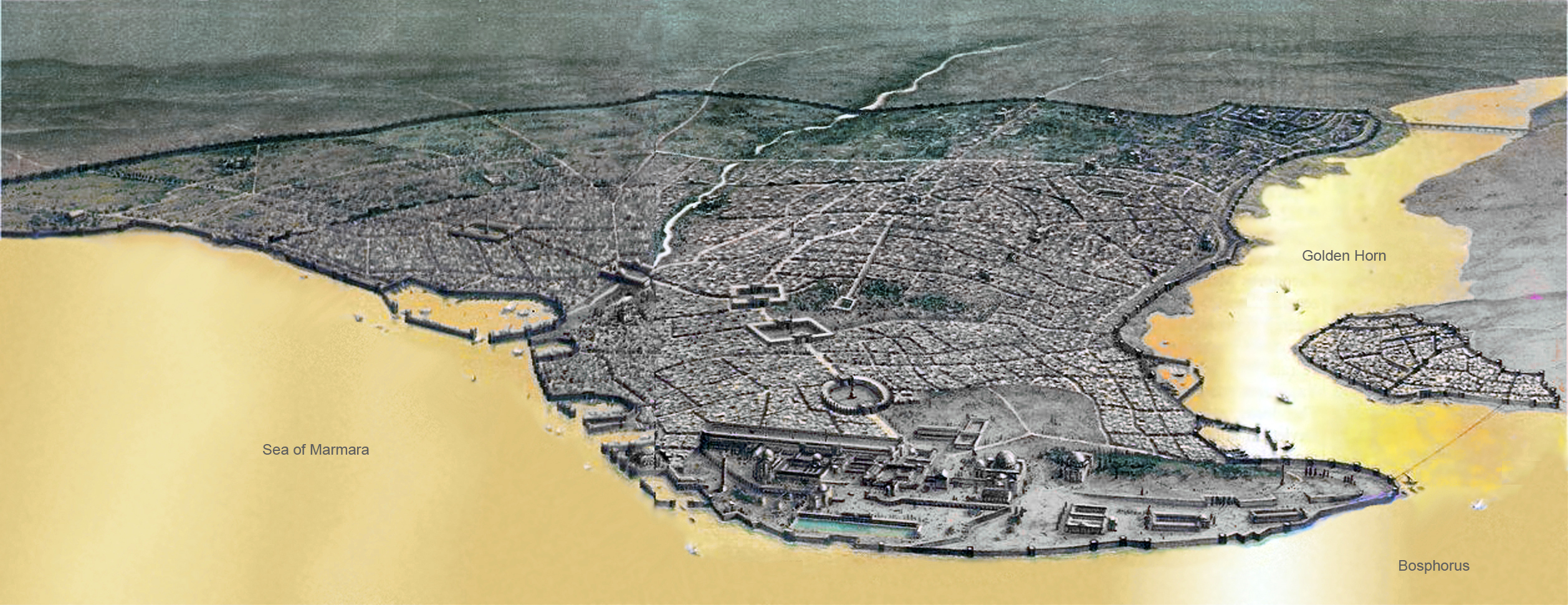
The first bridge on the Horn, built by Byzantine Emperor Justinian the Great, can be seen near the Theodosian Walls at the western end of the city (see upper right) in this rendering of old Constantinople.

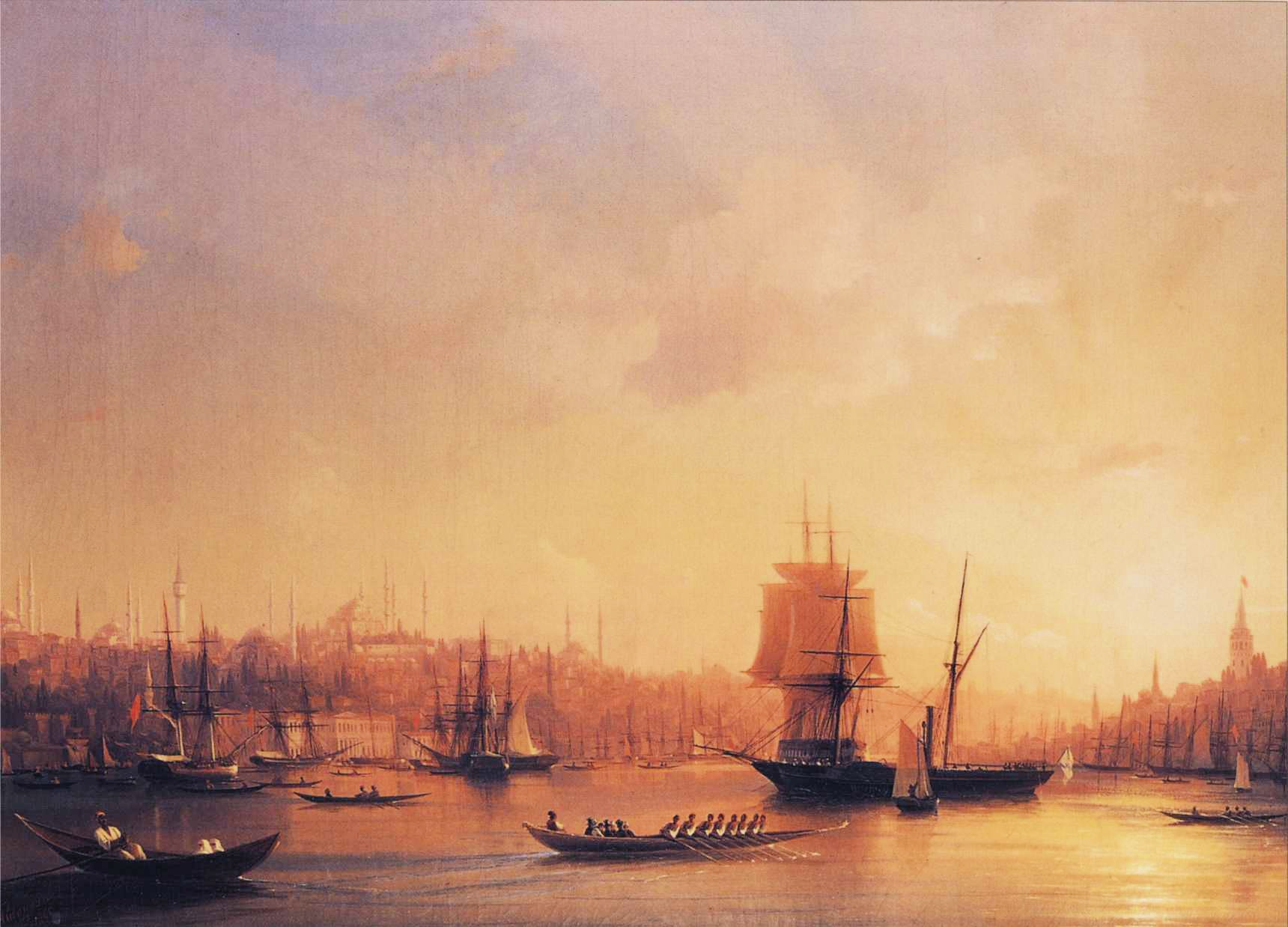
Ivan Constantinovich Aivazovsky's "Dusk on the Golden Horn", depicting the estuary's trademark golden lights. The entrance to the Horn is in the foreground, with the Historic Peninsula (left), and Galata (right).

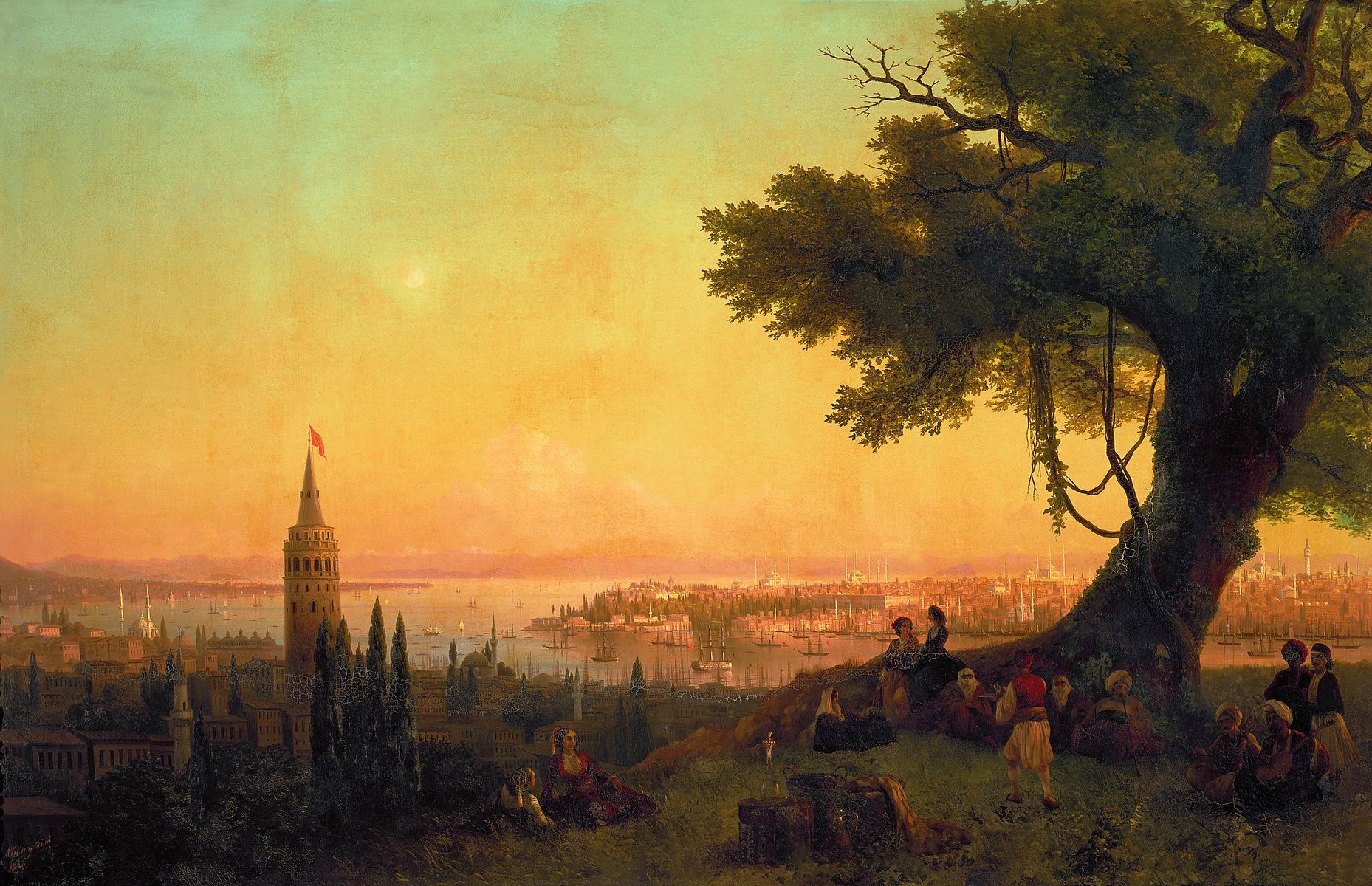
Another painting by Aivazovsky, titled "View of Constantinople by Evening Light", depicting the Horn as seen from a hilltop near Kasımpaşa. Visible in the background are the Galata Tower, the entrance to the Horn, and Seraglio Point.

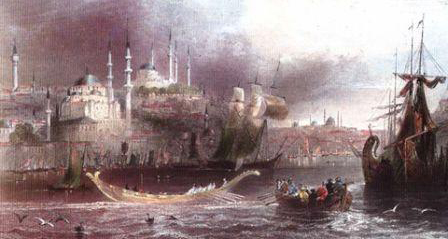
Boats on the Golden Horn, with Süleymaniye Mosque atop the city's Third Hill in the background. Vantage point for this painting is likely around Karaköy.

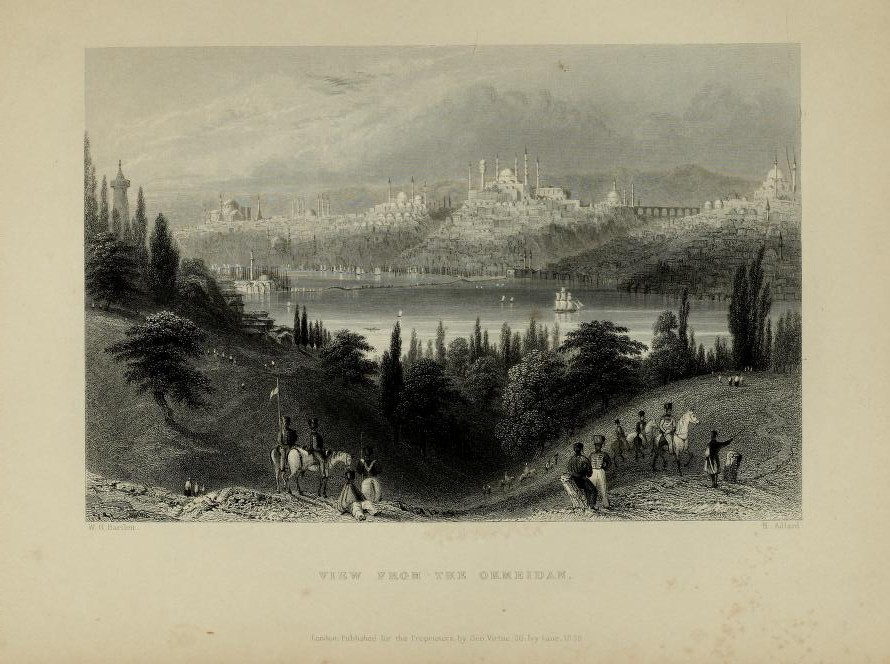
1838 View of the Golden Horn from the hills of Okmeydanı - the imperial archery practice fields of the Ottoman Army.

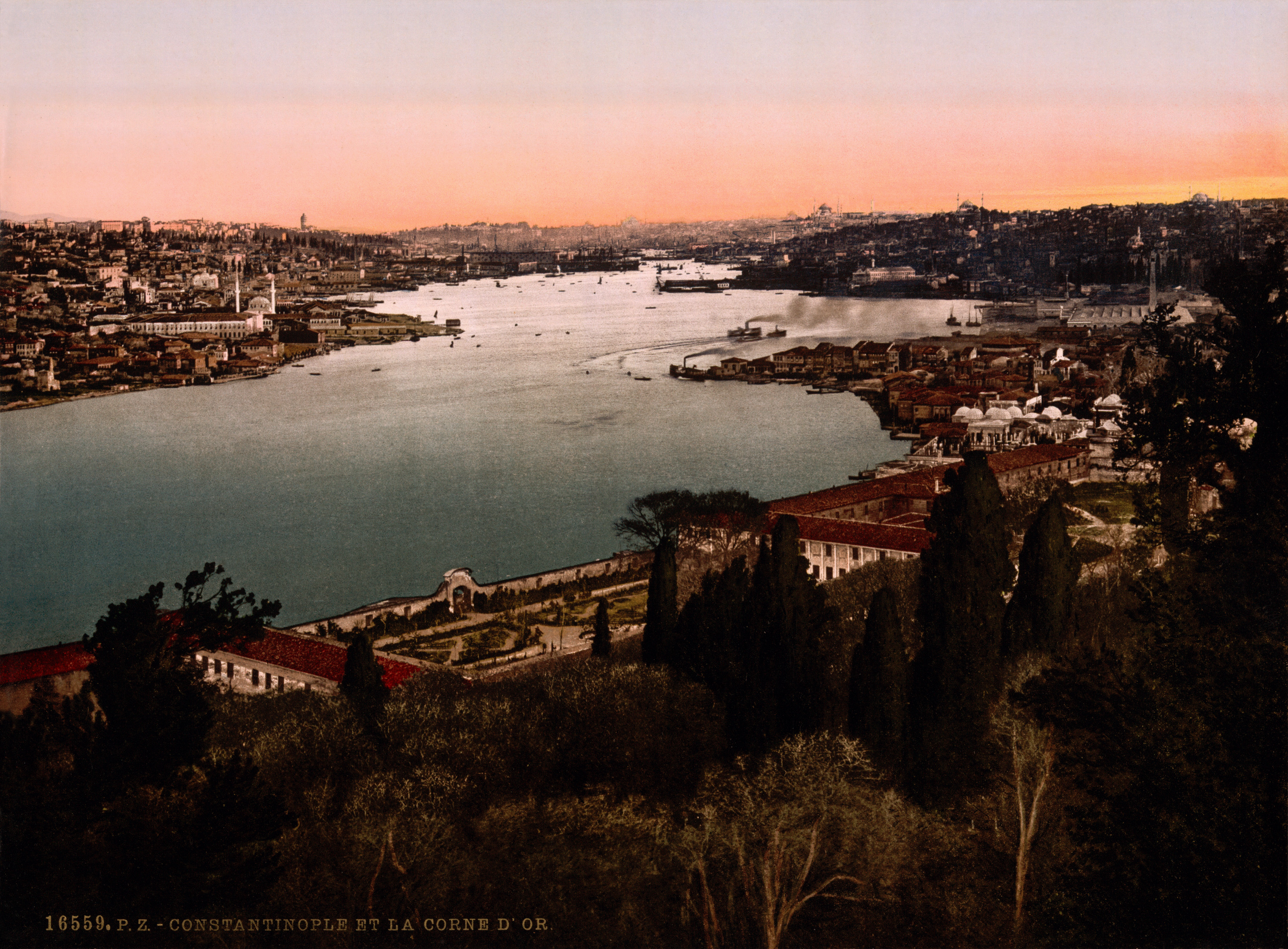
The Horn as seen from the hills of Eyüp in the 1890s, looking toward Sütlüce in the foreground, and the Old City in the distance.

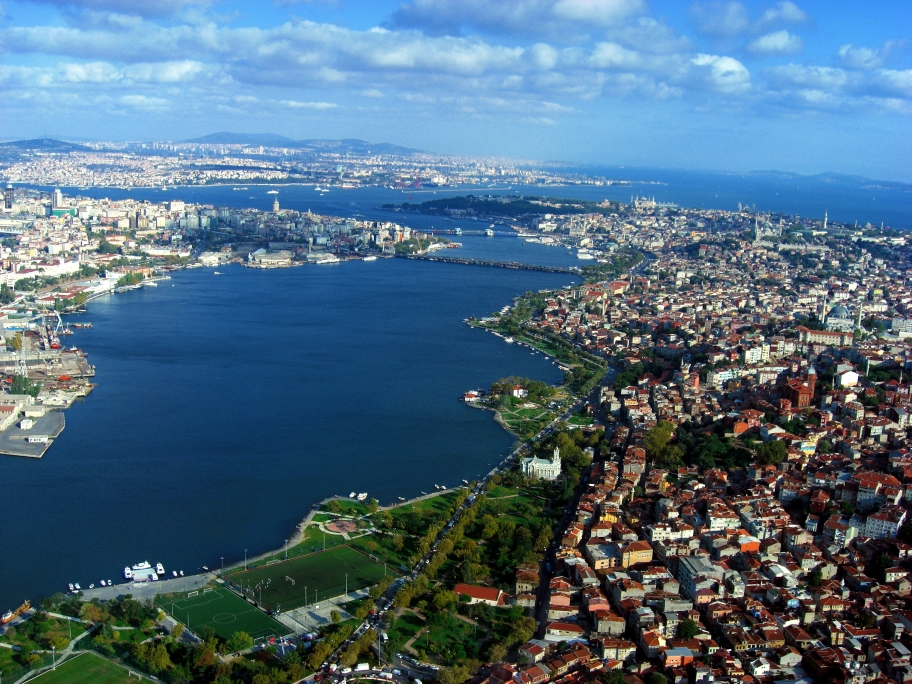
The Golden Horn, looking from upstream to downstream (i.e. from northwest to southeast), toward the Bosphorus.

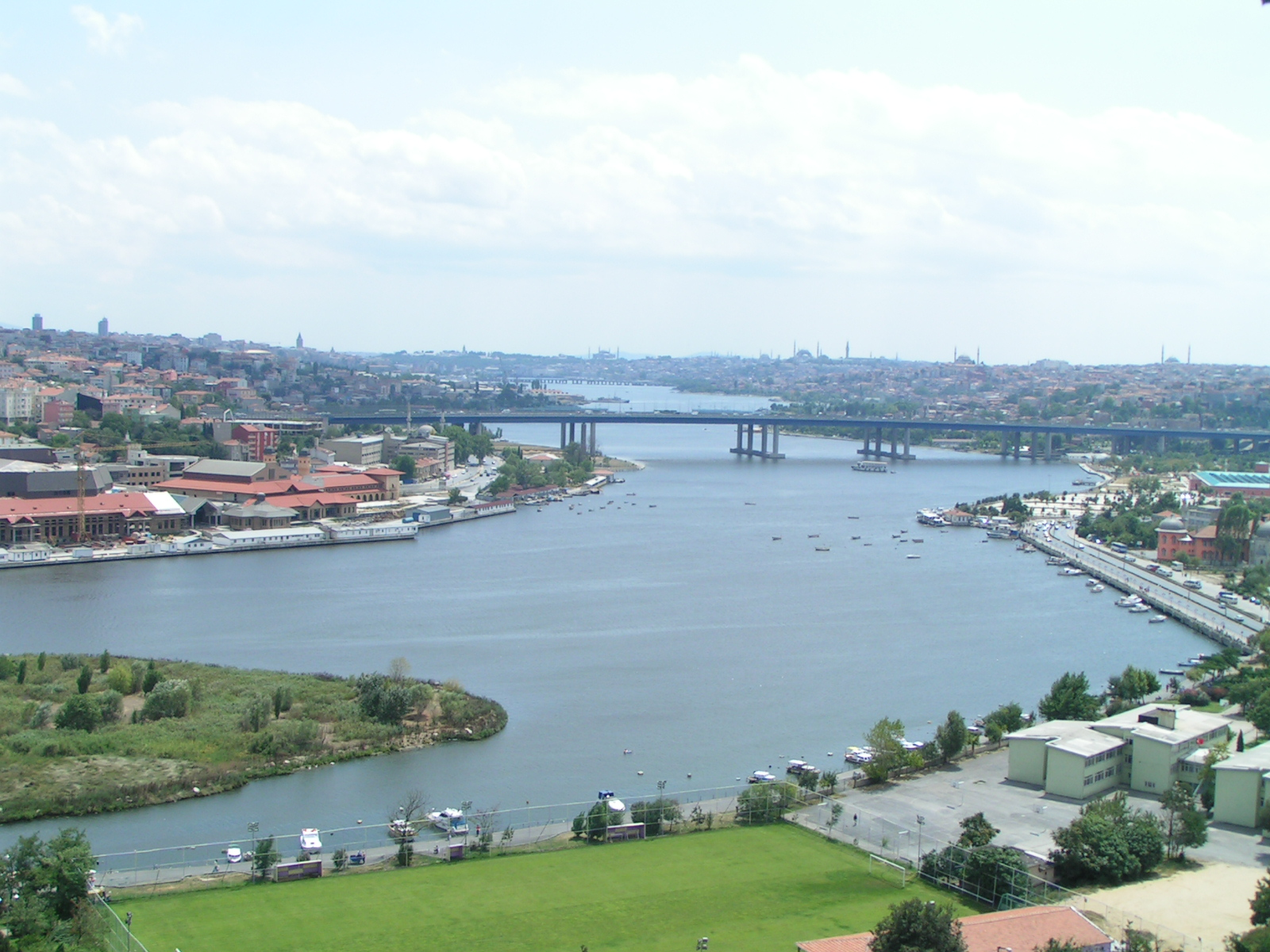
Looking downstream from Pierre Loti Hill in Eyüp toward Sütlüce (foreground, opposite shore), the Haliç Bridge (midground), and the entrance to the Golden Horn (far background).

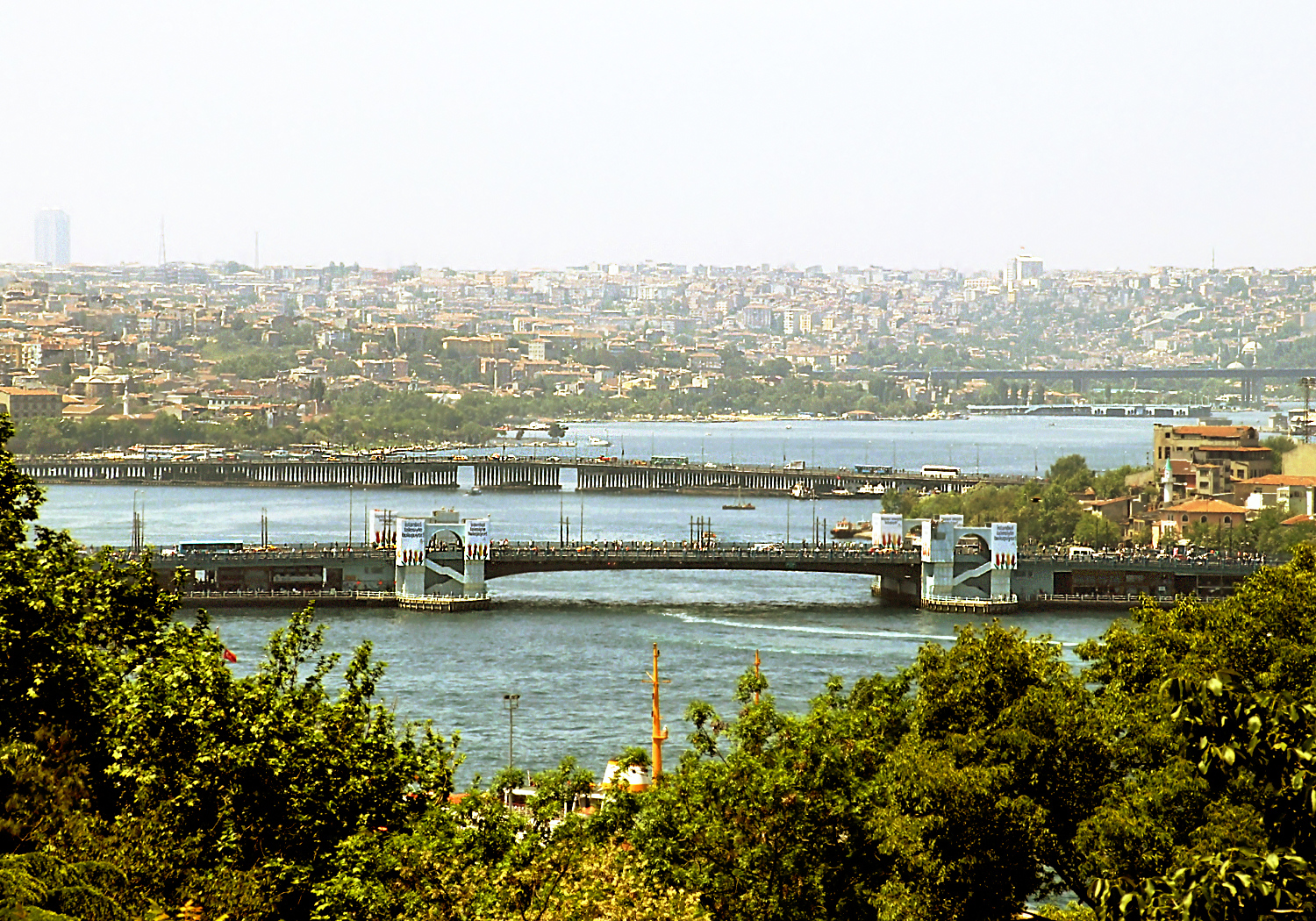
Looking upstream from Seraglio Point in 2006. Galata, Atatürk, and Haliç bridges are seen from closest to farthest. The Golden Horn Metro Bridge, presently positioned between the first two bridges, was completed eight years after this photograph, and is thus not visible.

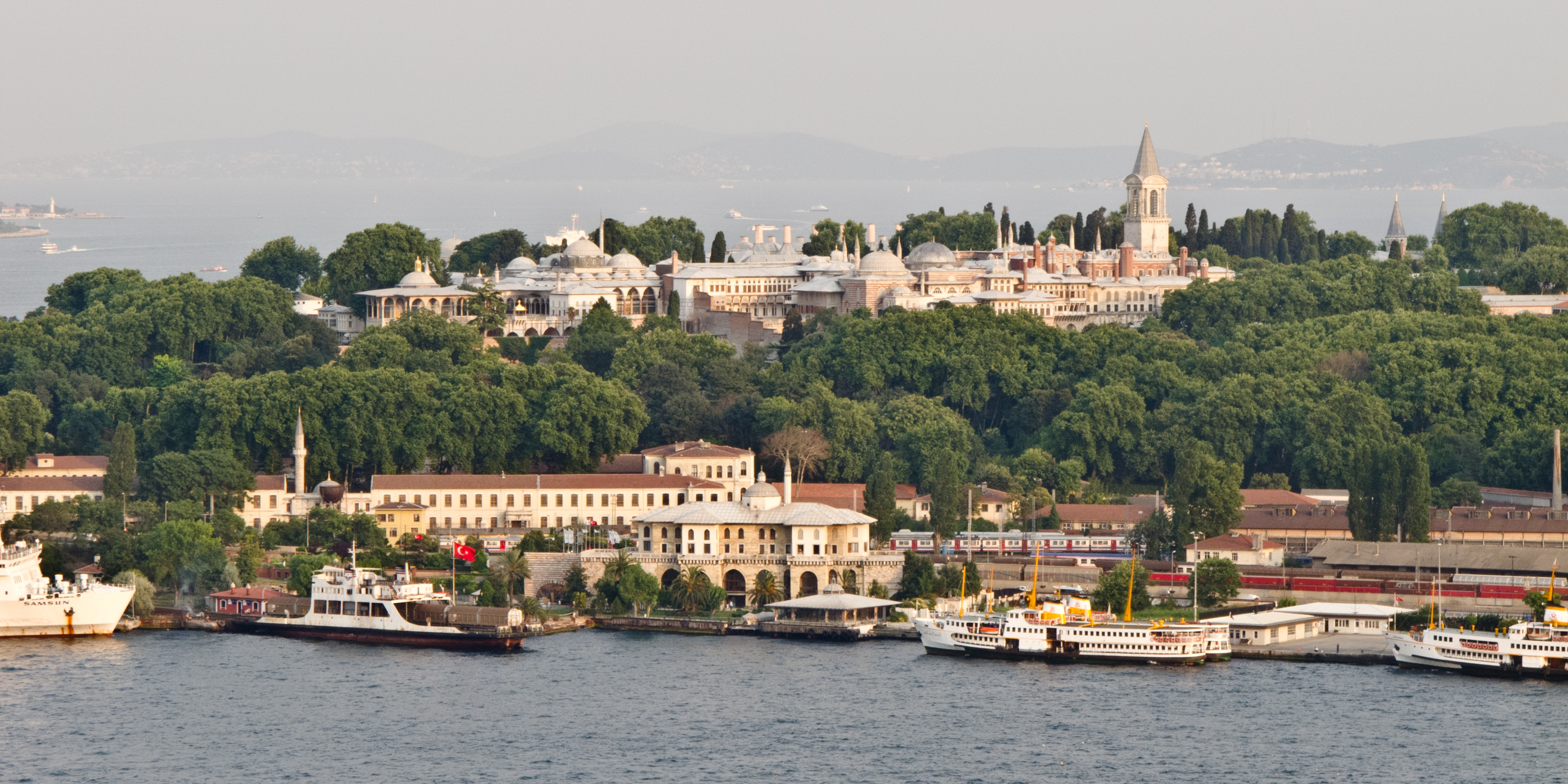
The entrance to the Golden Horn and Seraglio Point (at the very tip of the Historic Peninsula, at far left), as seen from Galata Tower

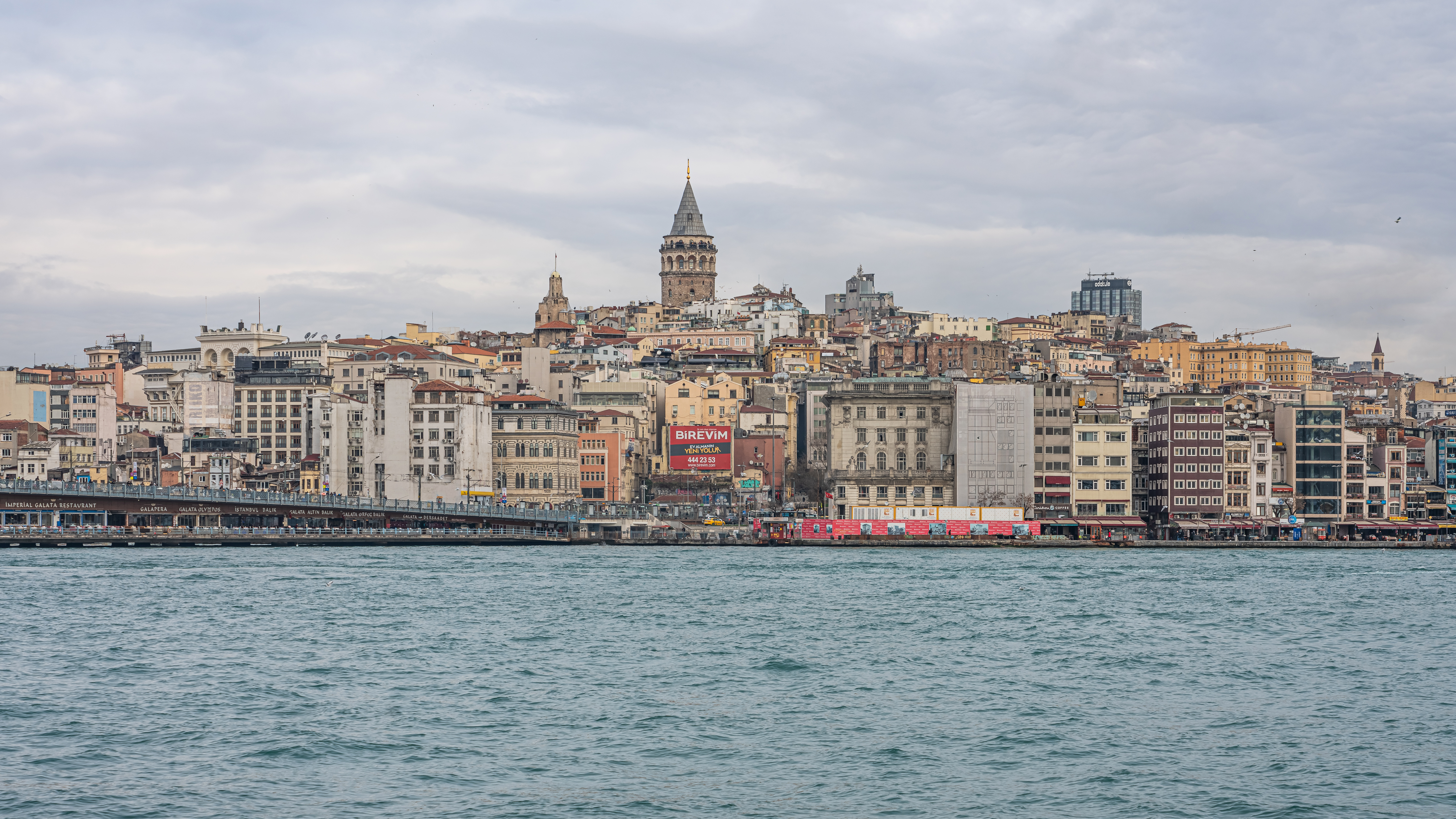
View of Karaköy (foreground) and Galata Tower (background) from Eminönü.

== See also ==
- Atatürk Bridge
- Galata Bridge
- Galata Tower
- Metro Bridge
- Haliç Bridge
- List of deepest natural harbours
