= Balkapan Inn =

The Balkapan Inn or Balkapanı Han was an inn in the Fener neighbourhood of Istanbul. Built upon extensive medieval vaults, it is first mentioned in historical sources in the 17th century, when it was the base of Egyptian honey merchants in Constantinople. In the 19th century it became a centre of social, commercial and cultural life for Christians travelling to the city from Ottoman Bulgaria, especially tailors. The first Bulgarian language printing press was set up on the premises in 1849. The complex now houses a number of small shops.
