= Maria Palaiologina =

Byzantine wife of 13th century Mongol ruler, Abaqa Khan

- Khatun of the Ilkhanate
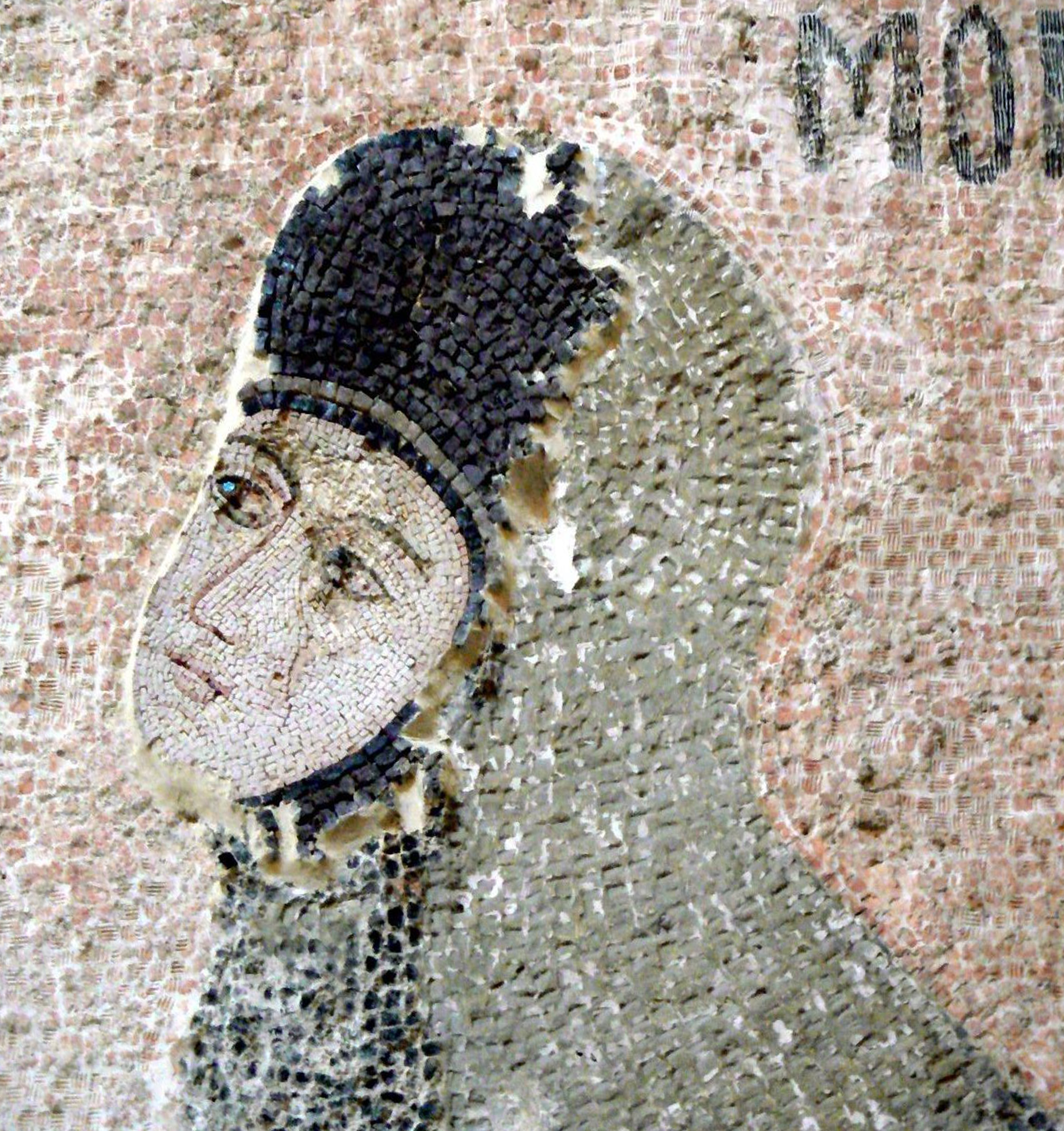
- Maria Palaiologina, depicted in a Byzantine mosaic in Chora Church, Istanbul

Khatun of the Ilkhanate
- Tenure: 1265 – 1282
- Spouse: Abaqa Khan
- Issue: Theodora Ara Qutlugh
- House: Palaiologos (by birth); Borjigin (by marriage)
- Father: Michael VIII Palaiologos

Maria Palaiologina (Greek: Μαρία Παλαιολογίνα) was the daughter of the Byzantine emperor Michael VIII Palaiologos (r. 1258–1282) who became the wife of the Mongol ruler Abaqa Khan, and an influential Christian leader among the Mongols. After Abaqa's death, she became the leader of a monastery in Constantinople which was popularly named after her as Saint Mary of the Mongols. Her monastic name was Melanie (Medieval Greek: Μελάνη).

== Historical context ==
In the 13th century, the Mongol Empire founded by Genghis Khan had expanded to its greatest extent. Hulagu Khan, grandson of Genghis, had swept with his army through Persia and Syria, destroying centuries-old Islamic caliphates, those of the Abbasids and Ayyubids, and led the 1258 Siege of Baghdad.

However, the Mongol empire was experiencing internal dissension, and though the center of power was the Great Khan in Karakorum, the empire had split into four "khanates", each controlled by a different grandson of Genghis. Hulagu's portion was known as the Ilkhanate and stretched through the area that today covers parts of Turkey and Iran in the west, and Pakistan in the east. The section in the north, covering parts of Russia and Eastern Europe, was known as the Golden Horde. Relations between the Khanates were not friendly, and battles erupted between them, even as they both were attempting to further extend the empire westwards towards Europe, Greece, and the Middle East.

== Arranged marriage ==
Michael VIII, the Byzantine emperor based in Constantinople, attempted to maintain friendly relations with both khanates. Hulagu had been negotiating for a lady of the imperial family of Constantinople to be added to his number of wives, and Michael selected his illegitimate daughter Maria. He also betrothed another of his daughters, Maria's sister Euphrosyne Palaiologina, to Nogai Khan, head of the Golden Horde. Both khanates maintained an attitude of tolerance towards the Christians.

On her journey to marry Hulagu, Maria left Constantinople in 1265, escorted by the abbot of Pantokrator monastery, Theodosius de Villehardouin. Historian Steven Runciman relates how she was accompanied by the Patriarch Euthymius of Antioch. However, in Caesarea they learned that Hulagu had died, so Maria was instead married to his son, Abaqa Khan. She led a pious life and was quite influential on the political and religious outlooks of the Mongols, many of whom were already Church of the East Christians. They had previously looked to Doquz Khatun, Hulagu's wife, as a religious leader. When Doquz also died in 1265, this sentiment turned to Maria, who was called "Despina Khatun" by the Mongols (Δέσποινα being Greek for "Lady").

== Widowhood ==
Maria resided in Persia at the court of Abaqa for a period of 15 years, until her husband - a follower of Tengri - died and was succeeded by his Muslim brother Ahmad. According to Orlean's manuscript, Baidu Khan was close to Maria during her time in Persia and frequently visited her ordo (nomadic palace) to hear interesting stories about Christianity.

She eventually returned to Constantinople. In 1307, during the reign of Andronicus II, she was again offered in marriage to a Mongolian prince, Charbanda, the Mongol ruler of the Middle East in order to secure an alliance against the rising power of the Ottomans, who at that time were threatening the Byzantine city of Nicaea. Maria went there, both to encourage its defense and to hasten the negotiations with the Mongols about her wedding. She met with the Ottoman Sultan, Othman, but her menacing conduct aroused the spirit of the Ottomans. Before the 30,000 troops sent to her aid by the Mongols could reach the city, the Ottomans stormed the fortress of Tricocca, which was the key to Nicaea, and conquered it.

Maria was then forced to go back to Constantinople once again, where she became the Ktetorissa of the Panagiotissa monastery, and remained there for the rest of her life. According to some sources, she brought back a daughter of her from Abaqa - Theodora Ara Qutlugh (Medieval Greek: Θεοδώρα Ἀραχαντλούν).

== Legacy ==
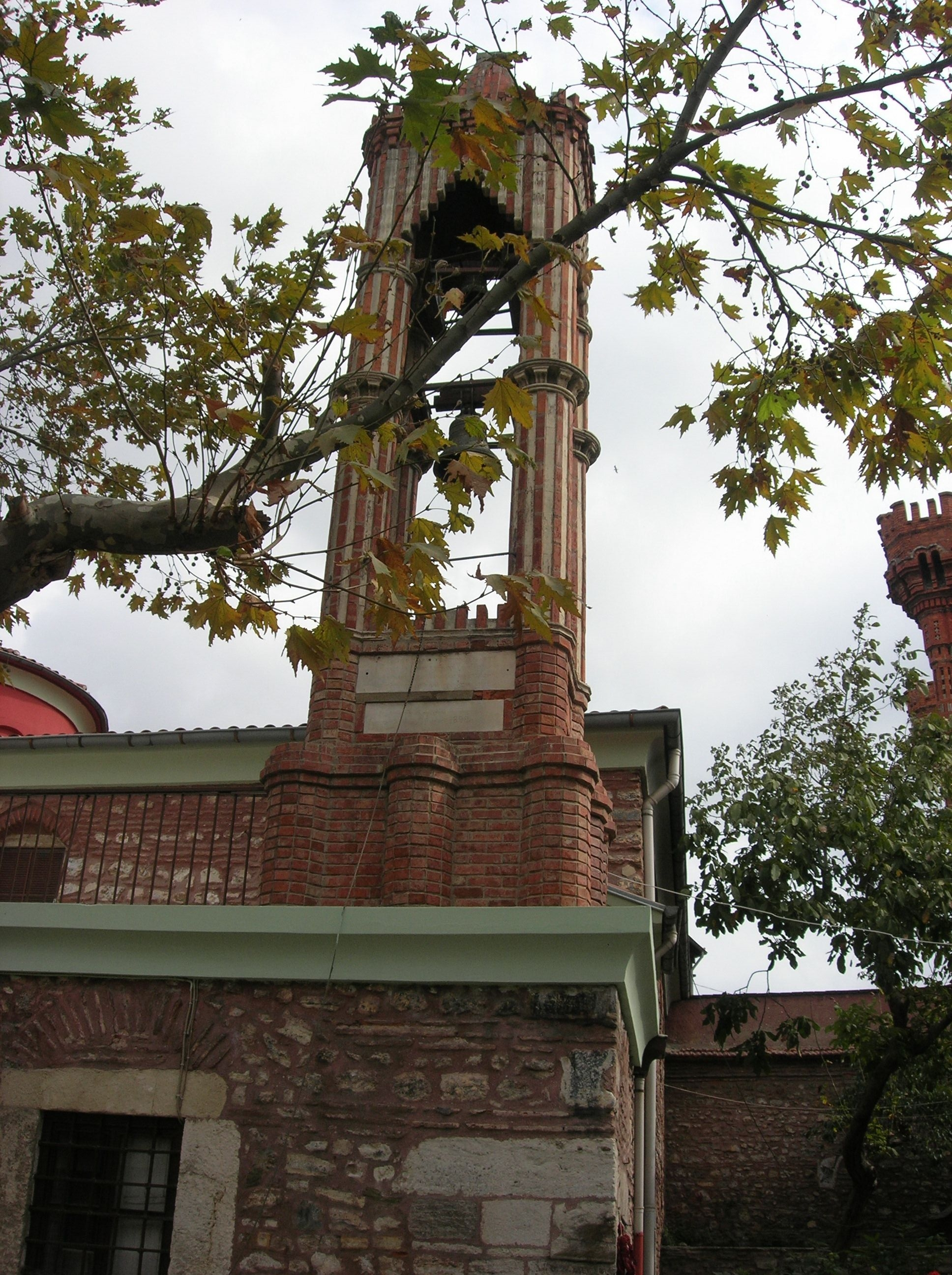
Maria Palaiologina ultimately became the Ktetorissa of the Monastery of the Theotokos Panaghiotissa, later known after her as Panaghia Mouchliotissa ("Our All-Holy Lady of the Mongols").

The church of the monastery was officially dedicated to the Virgin Mary but, due to Maria's association with it, became popularly known as the "Church of Saint Mary of the Mongols". Maria herself was never canonized.

The church is called by the Turks "Kanlı Kilise" (the Bloodstained Church), as the building saw violent combat during the capture of Constantinople by the Turks. The church is the only one in Constantinople to have never been converted to a mosque, following an order by Mehmet the Conqueror. It is located in Tevkii Cafer Mektebi Lane, in the quarter of Fener.

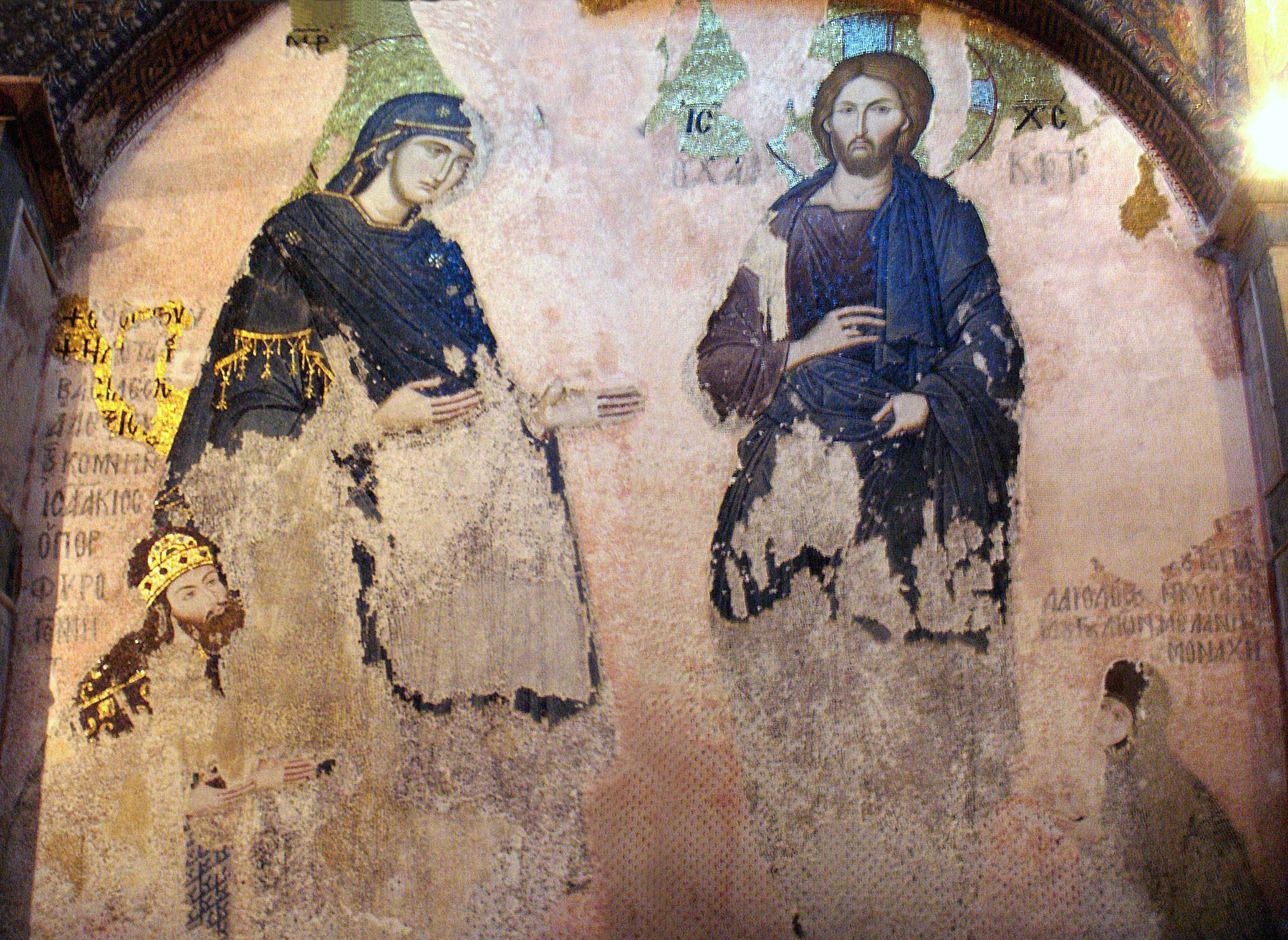
Deesis scene at Chora Church. The image of Maria (seen on top of page) can be seen in the lower right of this mosaic.

There is a surviving mosaic portrait of Maria, from the narthex at the Chora Monastery (she appears as a nun, with an inscription with her monastic name of Melania), in the lower right-hand corner of the Deesis scene.
