= Museum of Turkish Calligraphy Art =

Museum in Istanbul, Turkey

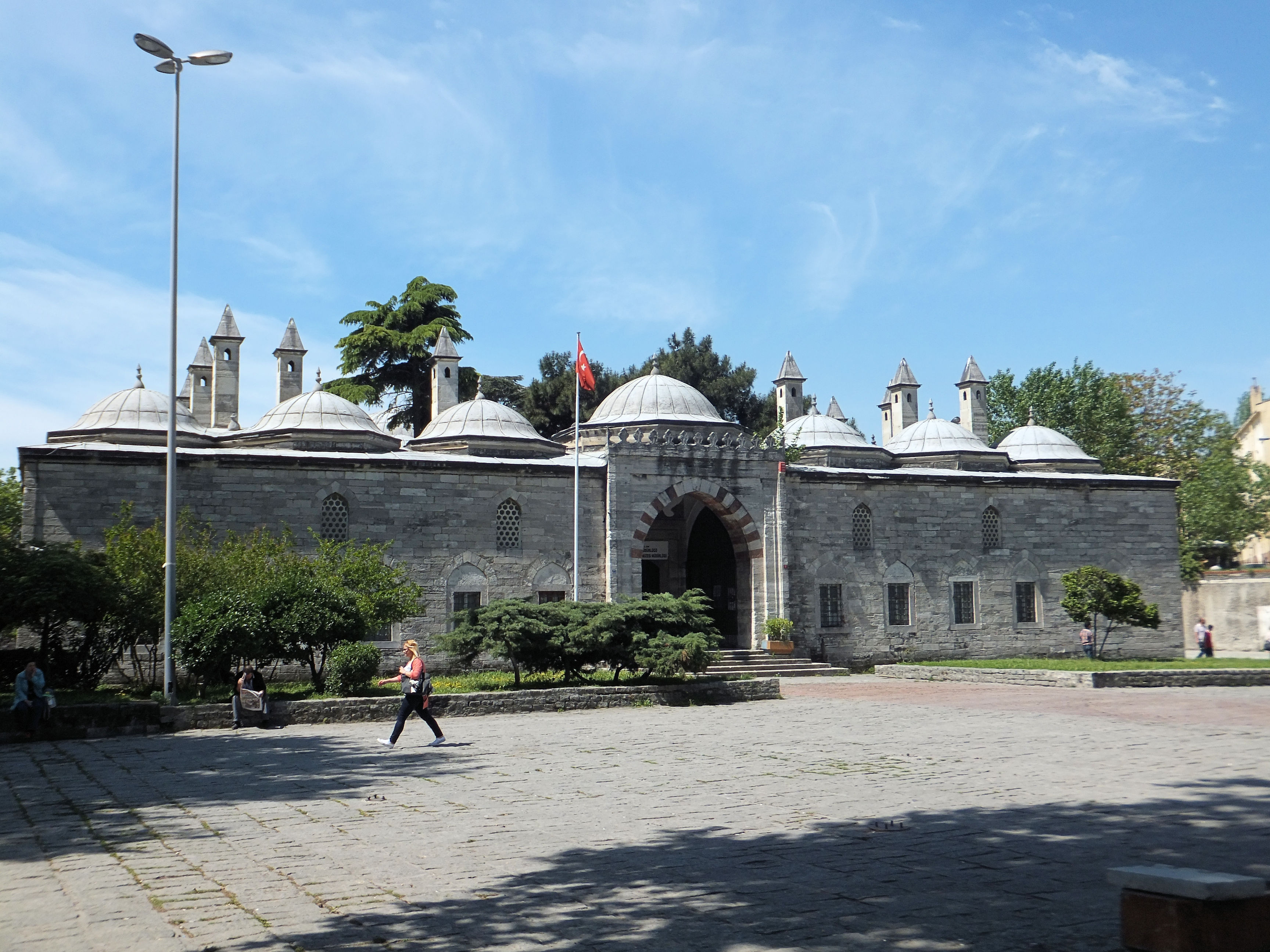
- Location: Istanbul, Turkey
- Coordinates: 41°00′36″N 28°57′48″E
- Location of Museum of Turkish Calligraphy Art

The Museum of Turkish Calligraphy Art (Turkish: Türk Vakıf Hat Sanatları Müzesi) is a museum located in Beyazıt Square in Fatih district of Istanbul, Turkey. It is housed in a former madrasa built in the early 16th century.

== History ==
The building formerly served as the madrasa of the Bayezid II Mosque complex, which was built on the order of Sultan Bayezid II, son of Mehmed II. The madrasa's construction was begun after the mosque's completion in 1505 and was finished in 1507.

The museum was first opened as the "Writing Museum" at the madrasa of the Yavuz Selim Complex in 1968. In 1984, it was moved to its present location and renamed "Museum of Turkish Calligraphy Art". Its collection consists of 3121 pieces mainly reflecting Islamic calligraphic art.

In 2015 the museum was closed for restoration. It was still closed as of 2020.

== See also ==
- Turkish and Islamic Arts Museum
- List of art museums
