= Church of Saint Mary of the Mongols =

Church of St. Mary of the Mongols
- Παναγία Μουχλιώτισσα (Greek)
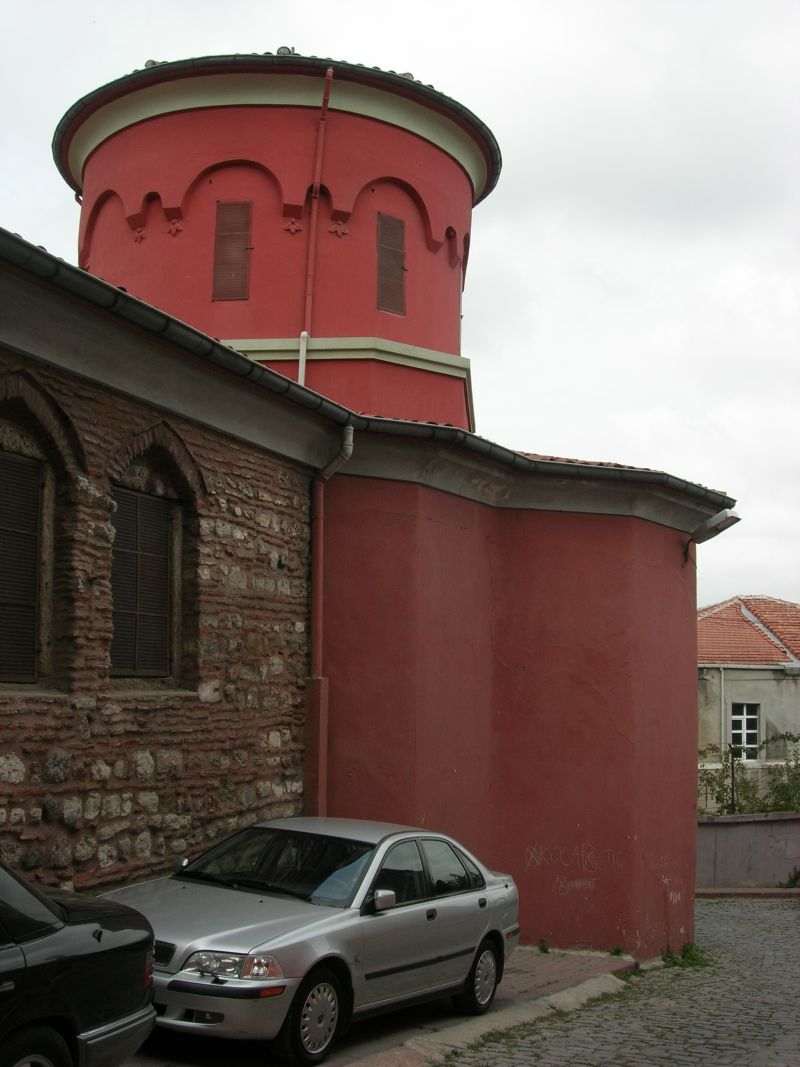
- The tower of the church viewed from south

- Location in the Fatih district of Istanbul
- 41.029722°N 28.948889°E
- Location: Fener, Istanbul
- Country: Turkey
- Denomination: Greek Orthodox

History
- Founded: Beginning of 7th century
- Founder: Sopatra / Maria Palaiologina
- Dedication: Theotókos Panaghiótissa

Architecture
- Style: Byzantine Architecture
- Completed: Shortly after 1281

Saint Mary of the Mongols (full name in Greek: Θεοτόκος Παναγιώτισσα (pr. Theotókos Panagiótissa, lit. "All-Holy Theotokos") or Παναγία Μουχλιώτισσα (pr. Panaghía Muchliótissa); Turkish name: Kanlı Kilise (meaning: Bloody Church), is an Eastern Orthodox church in Istanbul. It is the only surviving Byzantine church of Constantinople that has always remained a functioning house of worship of the Greek Orthodox Church. It and Hagia Irene are the only two Byzantine churches there never converted into mosques, the latter however being used as an arsenal until the 19th century, and currently operating as a museum and concert hall.

== Location ==
The church is located in the neighborhood of Fener, Fatih district. It lies on Tevkii Cafer Mektebi Sokak, at the summit of a slope overlooking the Golden Horn, and near the imposing building of the Phanar Greek Orthodox College. The church lies behind a high wall and all the doors are usually closed; however, the church is open to the public, but requires visitors to ring the doorbell near the entrance.

== History ==
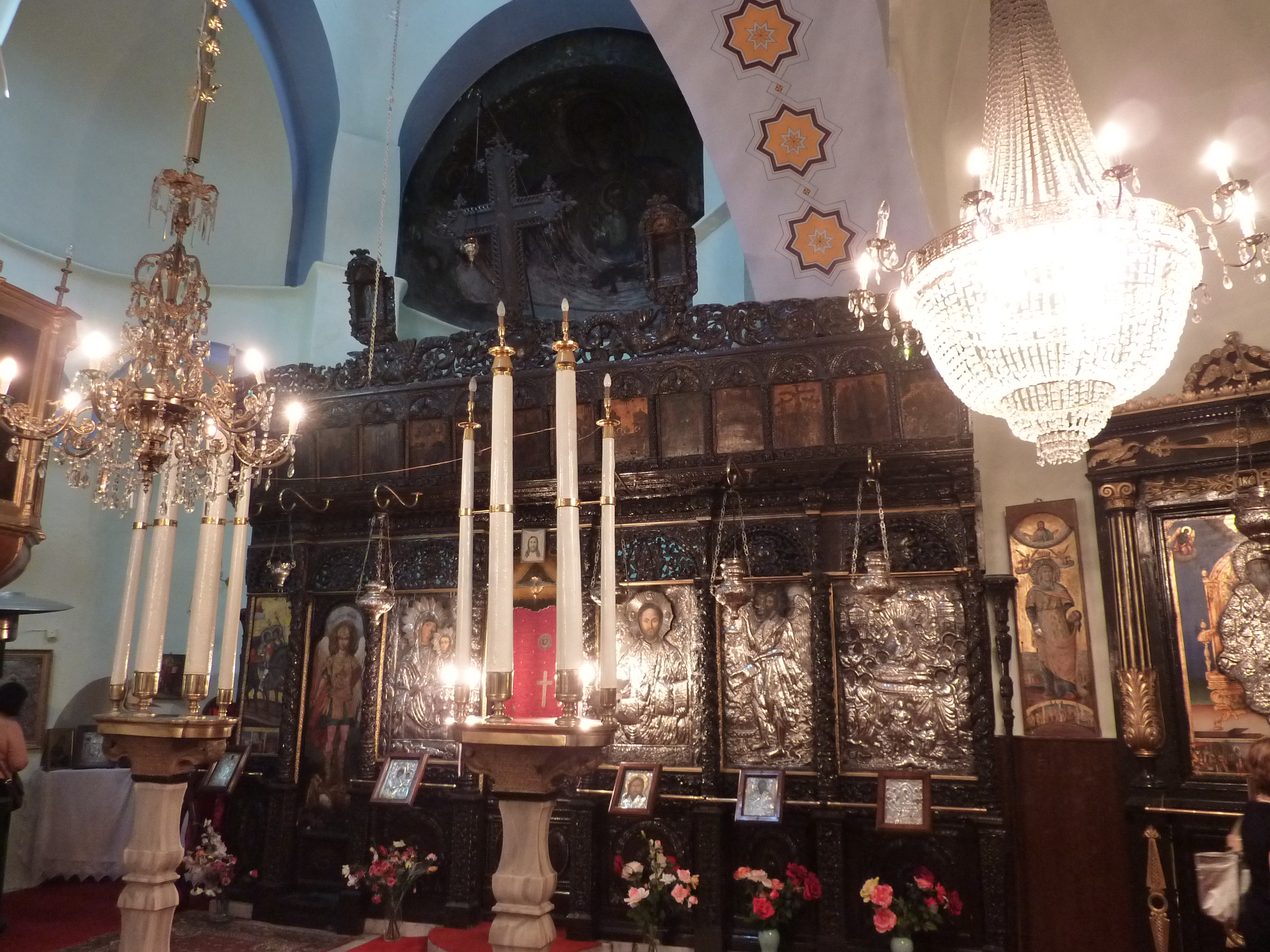
Inside the church

At the beginning of the 7th century, Princess Sopatra (daughter of the Byzantine Emperor Maurikios), and her friend Eustolia built a nunnery on the slope of the fifth hill of Constantinople. The ground, which was bestowed by the Emperor, lay north of the Cistern of Aspar and had been used up to then as a cemetery. The building was dedicated to Saint Eustolia. During the 11th century, a monastery was added. It was dedicated to All Saints, and had a close relationship with the monastery of the Great Lavra, on mount Athos. During the Latin domination after the Fourth Crusade, the monastery disappeared.

In 1261, after the reconquest of the city by the Byzantines, Isaac Doukas, father-in-law of George Acropolites and maternal uncle of Michael VIII Palaiologos, rebuilt a simple, one-storey monastery, dedicated to the Theotokos Panaghiotissa. In 1266, the building was enlarged, and a painter, named Modestos, decorated it.

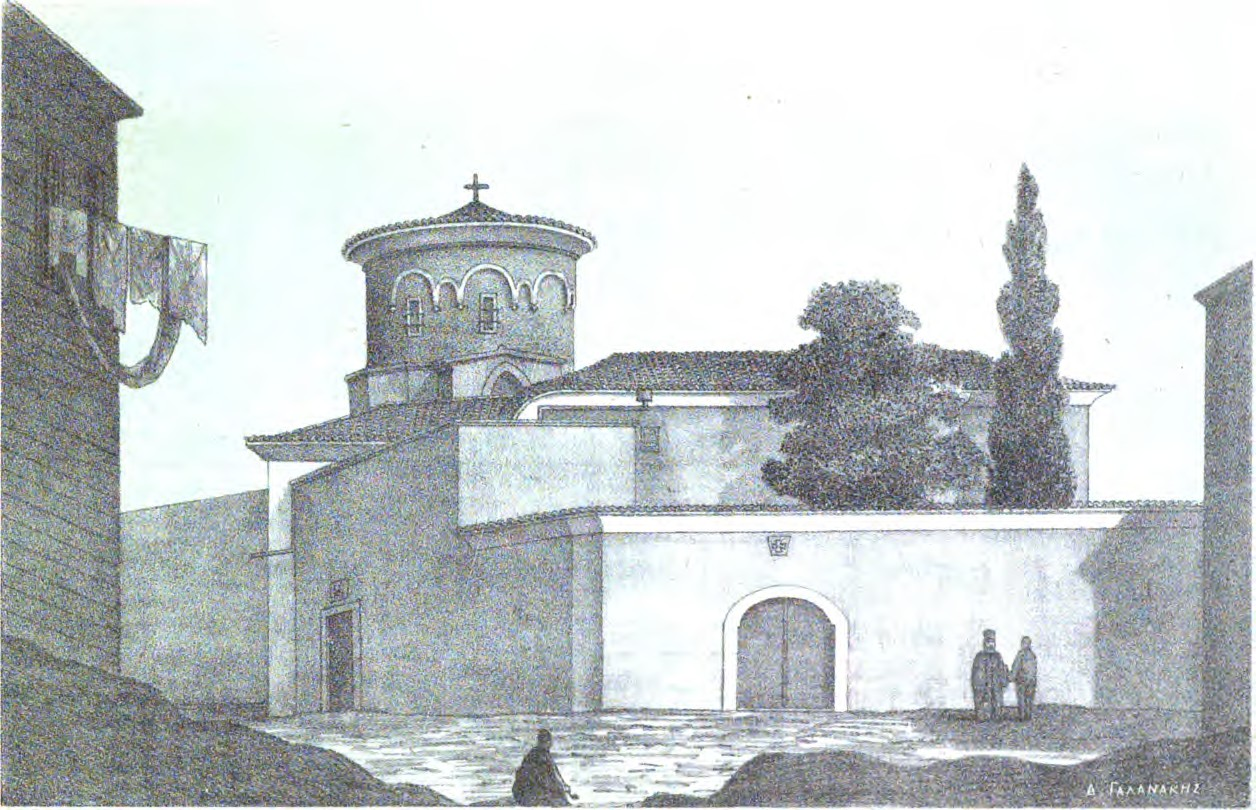
The church in 1877

In 1281, Maria Palaiologina, illegitimate daughter of Emperor Michael VIII and widow of Abaqa, Khan of the Mongolian Ilkhanate, returned to Constantinople after an absence of 15 years. She is said to have rebuilt the nunnery and the church (which then assumed the shape still seen today), deserving the title of Ktētorissa ("foundress") of that complex, and retired there until her death. Since that time, the nunnery and the church got the appellation of Mouchliōtissa ("of the Mongols" in Greek). After her death the convent decayed, because her heirs used the properties of the nunnery for their purposes, and had even raised a mortgage on them. Finally the nuns started a suit with the heirs first before the Emperor, and then before the Patriarch. The heirs presented as proof of their right an imperial chrysobull certifying the purchase of the nunnery from Maria Palaiologina, but the document was deemed false, so that the Patriarchate restored the rights of the nuns. The nunnery existed until the end of the Empire, then was abandoned.

On May 29, 1453, the day of the Fall of Constantinople, the surroundings of the building saw the last desperate resistance of the Greeks against the invading Ottomans.Thousands of civilians as well as surrendered soldiers rushed toward the area seeking refugee. They barricaded themselves inside the church repealing continuously attacks. Ottomans suffered losses including the flag-bearer of the sultan.When the fortification was breached the Ottomans showed monstrous brutality and the slaughter that followed was such that the blood ran as a river to reaching the Golden Horn.Due to that, the church got the Turkish name Kanlı Kilise ("Church of the Blood"), and the road that leads to it from the Golden Horn is still named the Ascent of the Standard Bearer (Turkish: Sancaktar yokuşu), in honour of an Ottoman standard bearer who found his death fighting here.

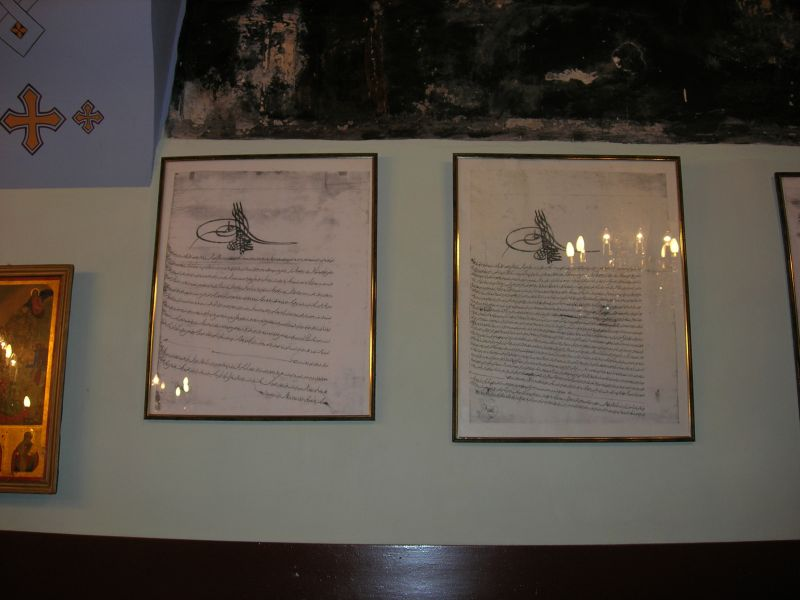
The firmans of Mehmed II and Bayazid II, which granted ownership of the church to the Greek community

Tradition holds that Sultan Mehmed II endowed the church to the mother of Christodoulos, the Greek architect of the mosque of Fatih, in acknowledgment of his work. The grant was confirmed by Bayazid II, in recognition of the services of the nephew of Christodoulos, who built the mosque bearing that sultan's name.

Under Sultans Selim I and Ahmed II there were two Ottoman attempts to convert the church into a mosque (the last one, pursued by Grand Vizier Ali Koprülü at the end of the seventeenth century, was thwarted by Dimitrie Cantemir) but, thanks to the grants of Mehmed II and Bayazid II, the church remained a parish of the Greek community. Thus, Saint Mary of the Mongols is one among the few Byzantine churches of Istanbul whose ancient dedication was never changed.

Damaged several times (in 1633, 1640 and 1729) by fires that ravaged Fener, the building was repaired and enlarged, losing altogether its primitive elegance. At the end of nineteenth century a small school was built close to it, and in 1892 a small bell tower was added. In 1955, the church was damaged during the anti-Greek Istanbul Pogrom, but since then it has been restored.

== Description ==
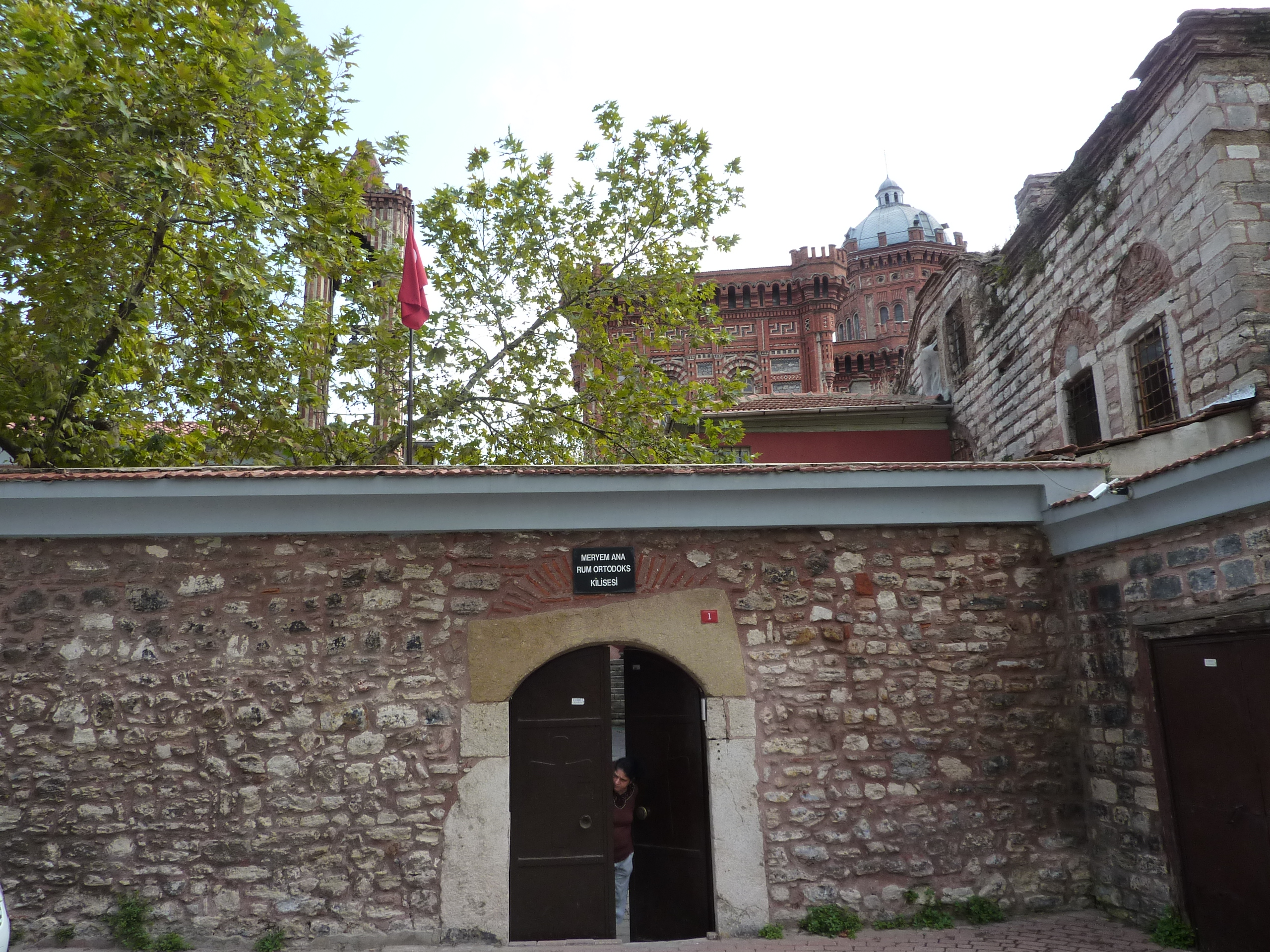
Entry to the church compound. The sign, in Turkish only, describes the church as "Meryem Ana Rum Ortodoks Kilisesi". The same name is mentioned by the Patriarchate as well. The Phanar Greek Orthodox College can be seen in the background.

The complex lies behind a high wall, and it is usually not open to the public. Although it has always remained in Greek hands, the building has been modified much more heavily than those converted into mosques. It has, or originally had, a tetraconch plan with a central dome enclosed by a tower, which renders it a unicum in the Byzantine architecture of Constantinople and, on a much smaller scale surprisingly anticipates those of many great Ottoman mosques.

The dome rests on a cross formed by four half-domes. The narthex has three bays, whose central bay is covered by a barrel vault. On the south side, the church has been demolished and rebuilt, and the southern half dome and the southern bay of the narthex have been removed and replaced by three aisles. The interior has been stripped of the original decoration, but it is filled with icons and other ornaments, making an examination of the church very difficult.

On the eastern wall there is a large representation of the Last Judgement, perhaps painted by Modestos in 1266. Moreover, noteworthy are a mosaic Icon from the eleventh century portraying the Theotokos, and four Icons dating from the thirteenth and fourteenth century.

Under the church are visible excavations, and an underground passage said to reach Hagia Sophia (although the two buildings are several kilometers apart). Despite its historical importance, the church has never been studied from an architectural point of view.

== Sources ==
- Van Millingen, Alexander (1912). Byzantine Churches of Constantinople. London: MacMillan & Co.
- Mamboury, Ernest (1953). The Tourists' Istanbul. Istanbul: Çituri Biraderler Basımevi.
- Janin, Raymond (1953). La Géographie ecclésiastique de l'Empire byzantin. 1. Part: Le Siège de Constantinople et le Patriarcat Oecuménique. 3rd Vol. : Les Églises et les Monastères (in French). Paris: Institut Français d'Etudes Byzantines.
- Müller-Wiener, Wolfgang (1977). Bildlexikon Zur Topographie Istanbuls: Byzantion, Konstantinupolis, Istanbul Bis Zum Beginn D. 17 Jh (in German). Tübingen: Wasmuth. ISBN 978-3-8030-1022-3.
- Ryder, Edmund C. (2010), "The Despoina of the Mongols and Her Patronage at the Church of the Theotokos ton Mougoulion", Journal of Modern Hellenism, Winter (27): 71–102
