= Bayezid II Mosque, Istanbul =

Mosque in Istanbul, Turkey

Bayezid II Mosque
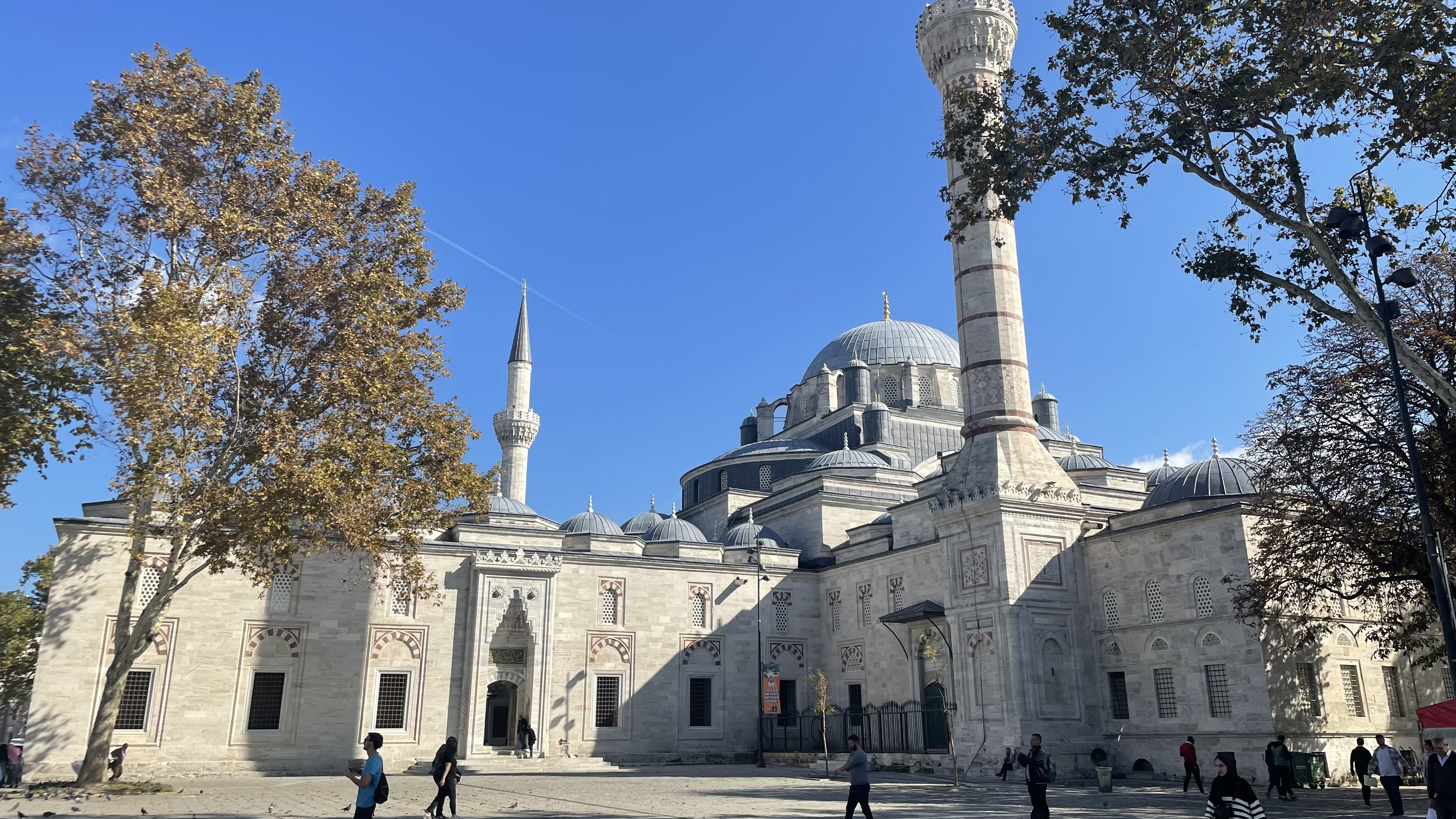

- Location within the Fatih district of Istanbul

Religion
- Affiliation: Sunni Islam

Location
- Location: Istanbul, Turkey
- Coordinates: 41°00′37″N 28°57′55″E

Architecture
- Architect: Mimar Hayruddin
- Type: mosque
- Style: Ottoman architecture
- Groundbreaking: 1501
- Completed: 1506

Specifications
- Length: 40 metres (130 feet)
- Width: 40 metres (130 feet)
- Dome height (outer): 44 metres (144 feet)
- Dome dia. (inner): 16.78 metres (55.1 feet)
- Minaret: 2
- Materials: granite, marble

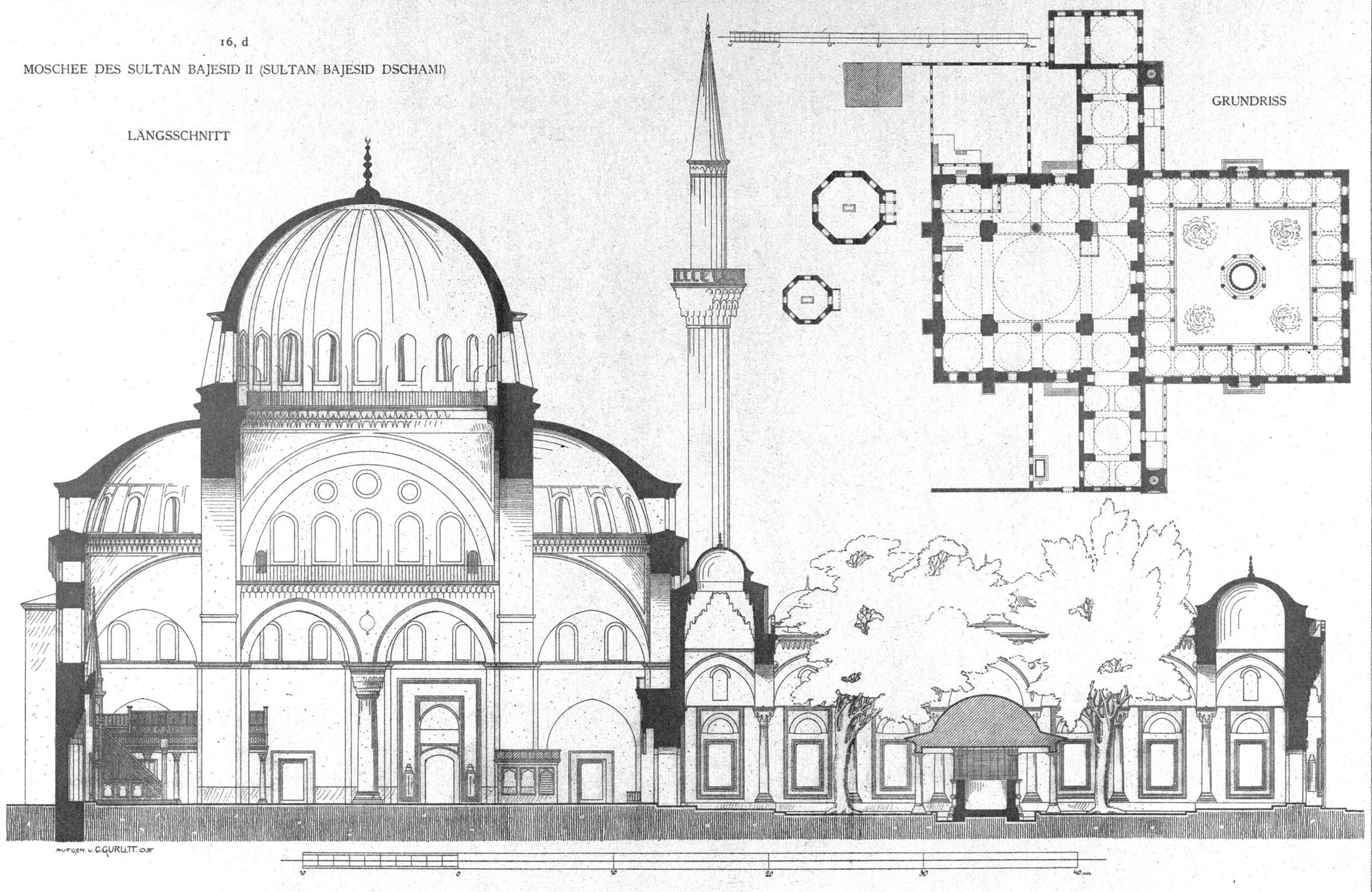
Cross section and plan of the mosque published by Cornelius Gurlitt in 1912

The Bayezid II Mosque (Turkish: Beyazıt Camii, Bayezid Camii) is an early 16th-century Ottoman imperial mosque located in Beyazıt Square in Istanbul, Turkey, near the ruins of the Forum of Theodosius of ancient Constantinople.

== History ==
The Beyazid Mosque was commissioned by the Ottoman Sultan Bayezid II, and was the second large imperial mosque complex (or selatin mosque) to be erected in Istanbul after the conquest in 1453. The earlier imperial complex, the Fatih Mosque, was later destroyed by earthquakes and completely rebuilt in a different style. As a result, the Beyazid complex is the oldest imperial complex in Istanbul that is preserved in more or less its original form, making it of considerable historical and architectural significance.

The mosque was constructed between 1500 and 1505, with a külliye (religious and charitable complex) added immediately afterwards. This included a medrese (theological college), completed in 1507; a large hamam (bathhouse), completed some time before 1507; an imaret (soup kitchen); a caravanserai; and several mausolea including the türbe of Bayezid II himself.

The chief architect of the mosque is not directly known. Based on Ottoman documents that mention architects during Bayezit II's reign, 20th-century scholar Rıfkı Melül Meriç identified Yakubşah ibn Islamşah as the most likely architect. (Note: This identification is cited approvingly by later scholars of Ottoman architecture, such as Godfrey Goodwin and Doğan Kuban. Another architect, Hayreddin, is also mentioned in Ottoman documents of the time, but he is less likely to have played a primary role.) One of Yakubşah's assistants, Yusuf ibn Papas, finished off the work on the medrese. That the architect was a nephew of the Greek architect of the Fatih Mosque (Atik Sinan or Christodoulos), is known from a grant of Bayezid II. This grant confirms the endowment by Mehmed II of the Greek Orthodox Church of Saint Mary of the Mongols, the only church in Istanbul that was never converted into a mosque, to the mother of Christodoulos (the Bayezid II Mosque's architect's grandmother) in acknowledgment of the two architects' work. Little else is known about Yakubşah ibn Islamşah other than that he also built a caravansarai in Bursa. However, the polished style of the mosque suggests experience with earlier Ottoman and western architectural techniques.

In 19th-century and early 20th-century accounts of the city it is often referred to as "the Pigeon Mosque" because of the large number of birds that congregated nearby to be fed by worshippers.

=== Damage and restoration work ===
The dome was partially rebuilt after an earthquake in 1509, and Mimar Sinan conducted further repairs in 1573–74.

The minarets were burned separately by fires in 1683 and 1754. They were also damaged by a lightning strike in 1743. A document dated October 1754 states that a special type of stone was brought from Karamürsel to repair the mosque. An inscription above the courtyard entrance suggests that repairs were also carried out in 1767 as a result of the earthquake which struck Istanbul in 1766.

Extensive new restoration work was started in August 2012 and took eight years to complete. During the process inappropriate materials used during previous repairs were removed, and damaged materials were either cleaned or replaced. The restoration involved a team of approximately 150 people and cost 49 million Turkish liras (approximately US$7.2 million). The mosque was reopened for worship in 2020.

== Architecture ==
=== Exterior ===
The mosque is oriented along the northwest–southeast axis with a courtyard to the northwest with an area almost equal to that of the mosque itself. The courtyard has monumental entrance portals on three sides and is surrounded by a colonnaded peristyle supported by twenty columns. Two of the columns are made of porphyry, ten are of verd antique, and six are of pink granite. It is roofed with 24 small domes and has a pavement of polychrome marble.

The mosque itself is square measuring approximately 40 metres (130 feet) per side and its dome is approximately 17 metres (56 feet) in diameter. The central dome is supported by two semi-domes along the main axis and two arches running along the secondary axis. The mosque is constructed entirely of cut stone using coloured stones and marbles.

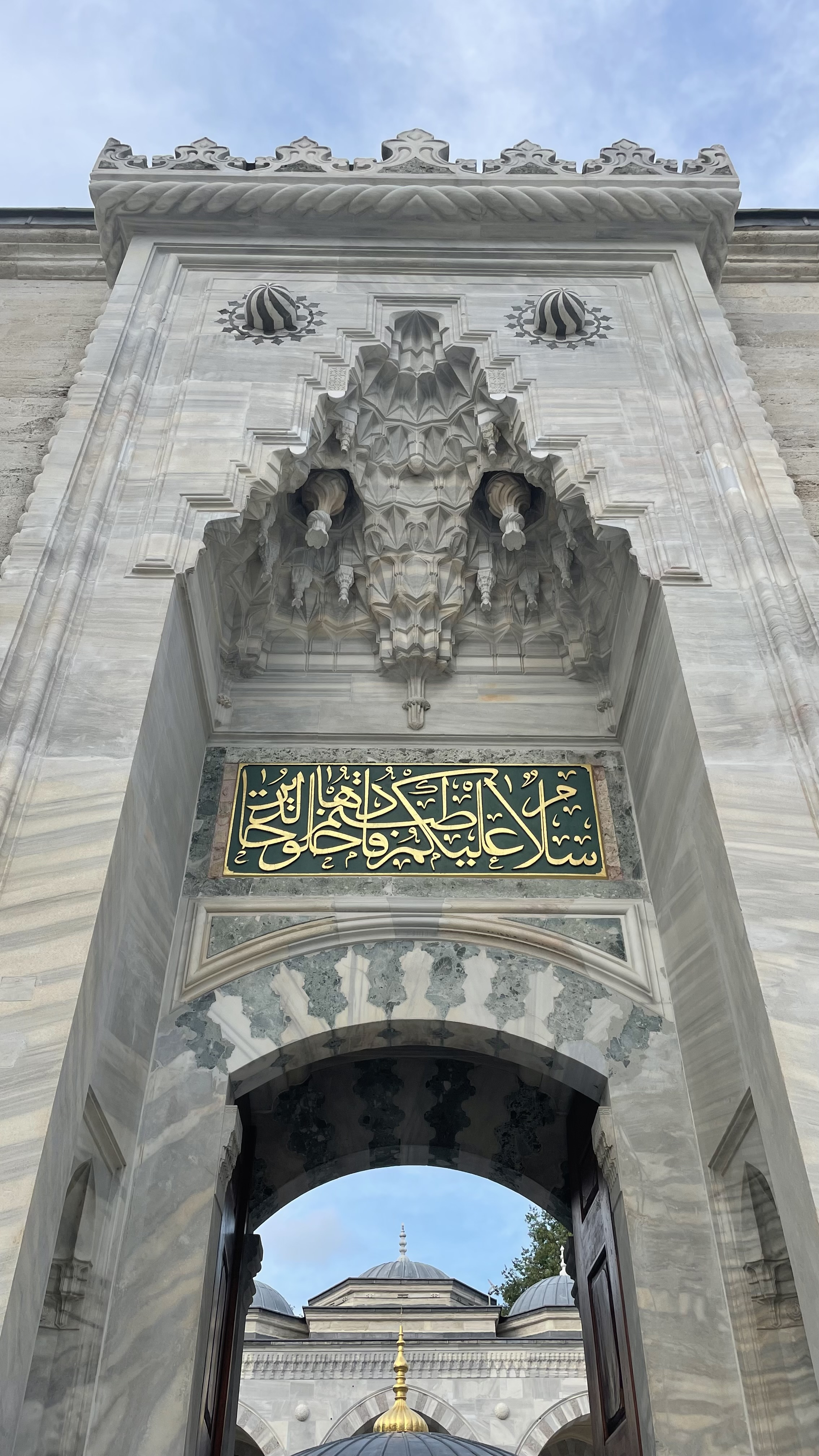
The entrance portal to the courtyard

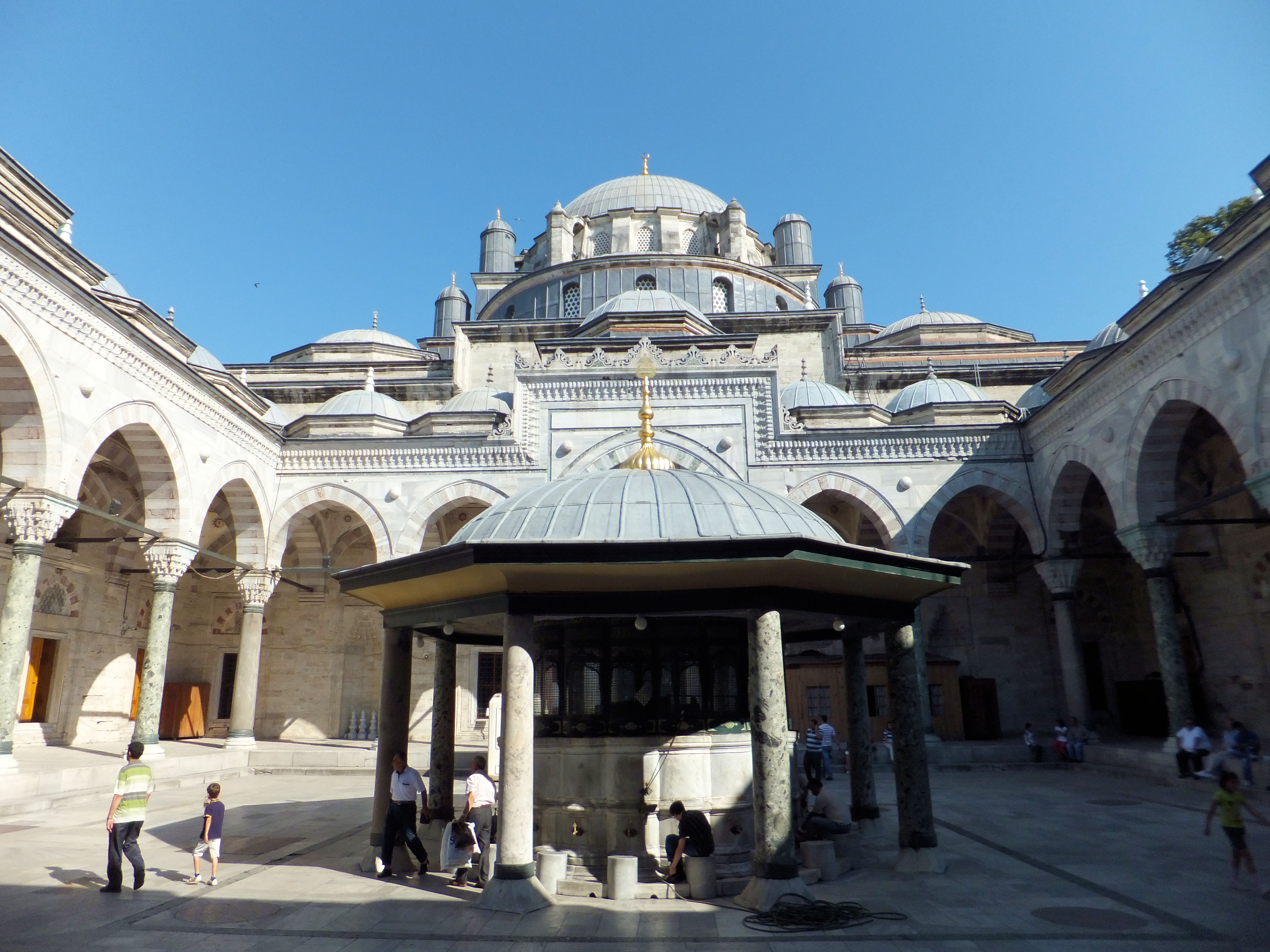
The courtyard and its shadirvan

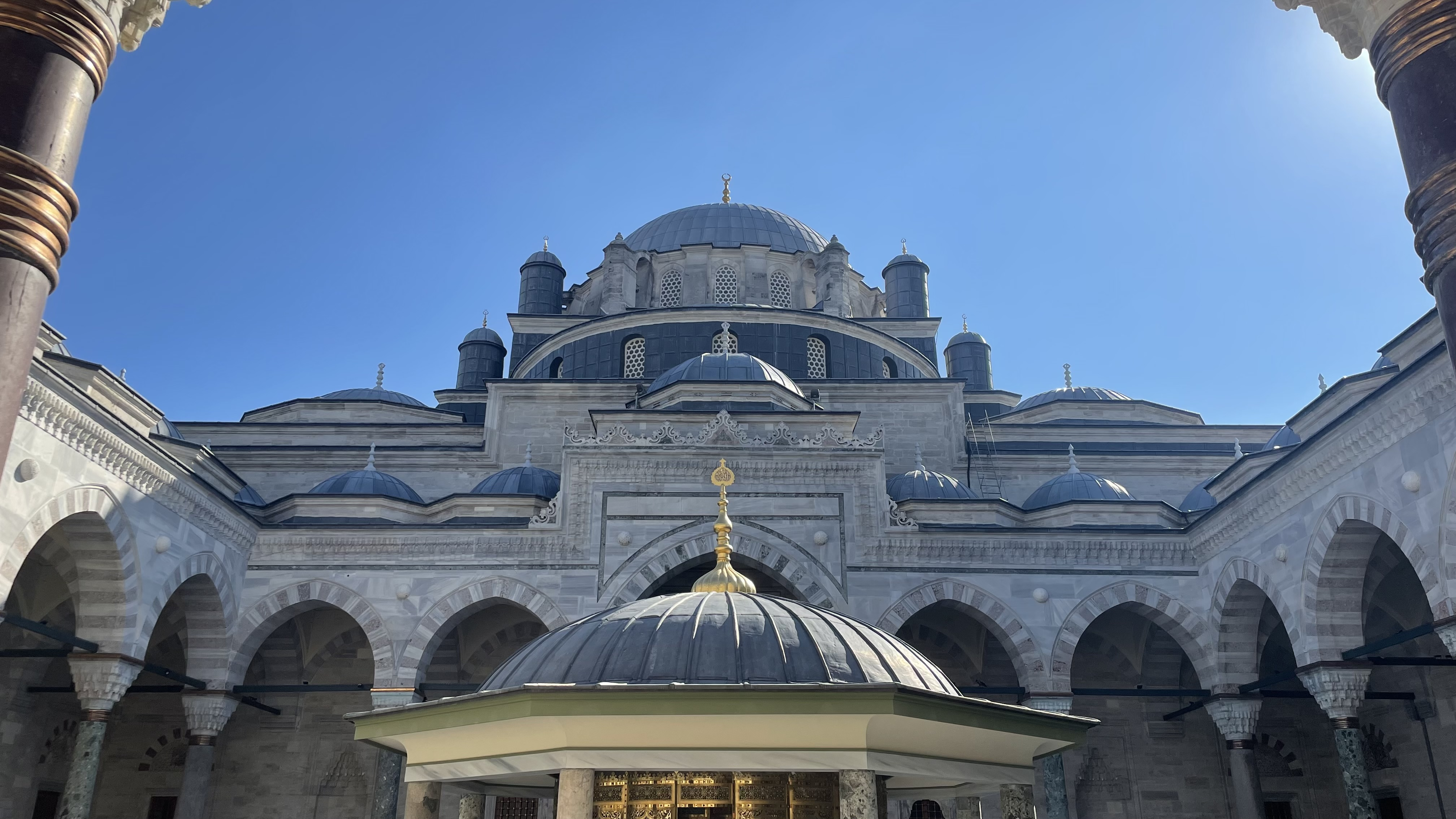
The courtyard and the domes

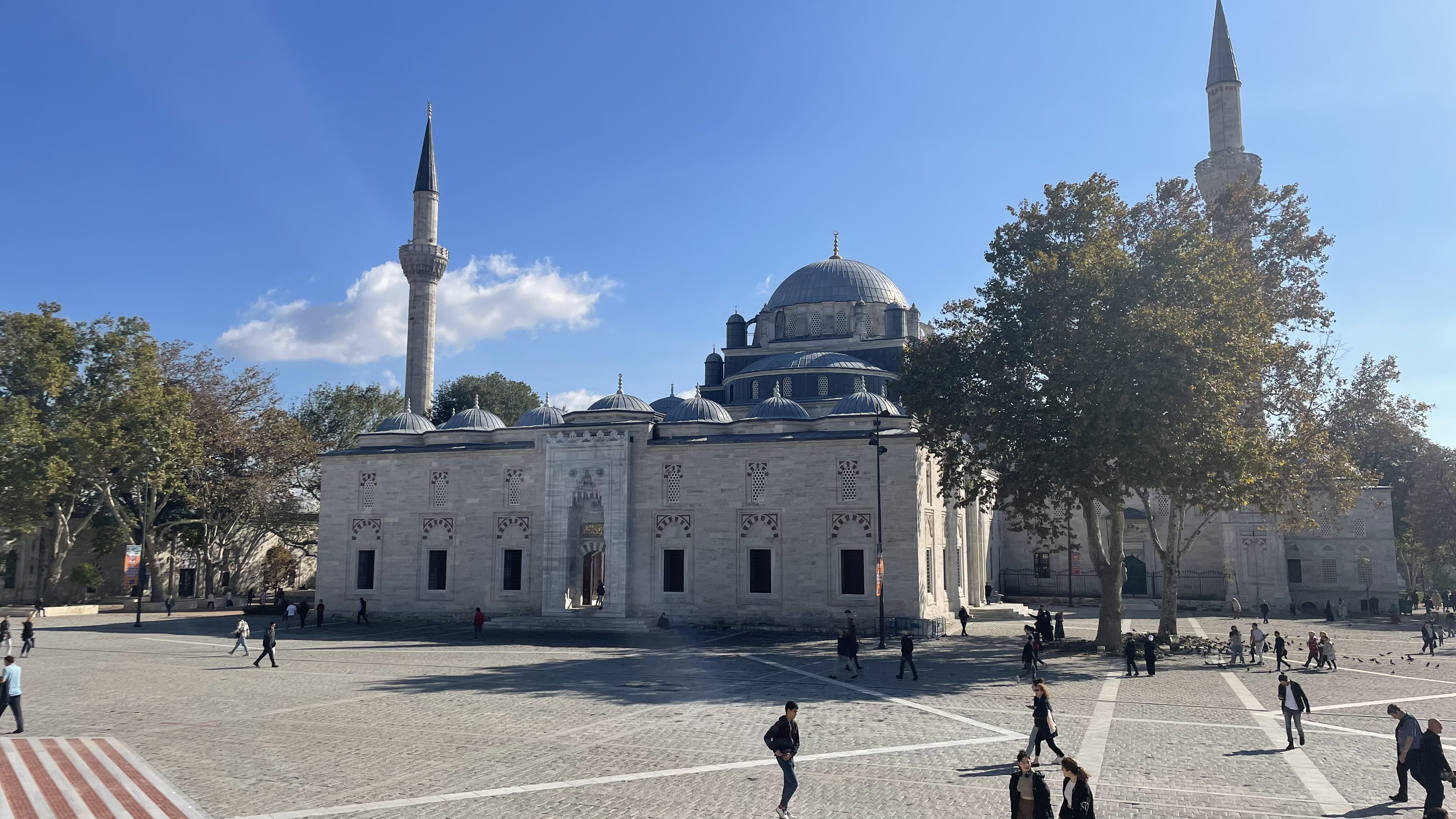
The view of the mosque from the Beyazıt Square

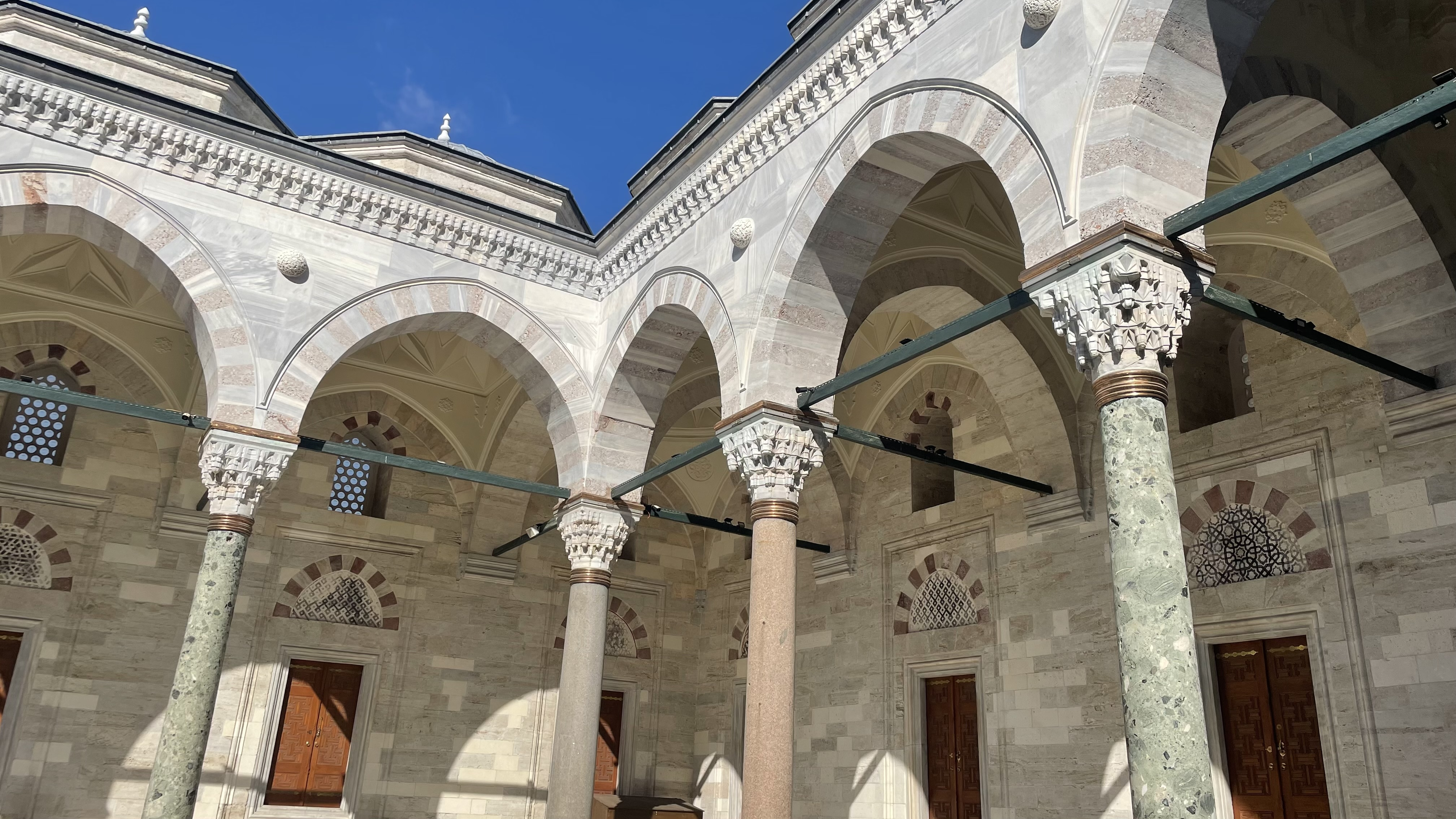
Columns with different colors

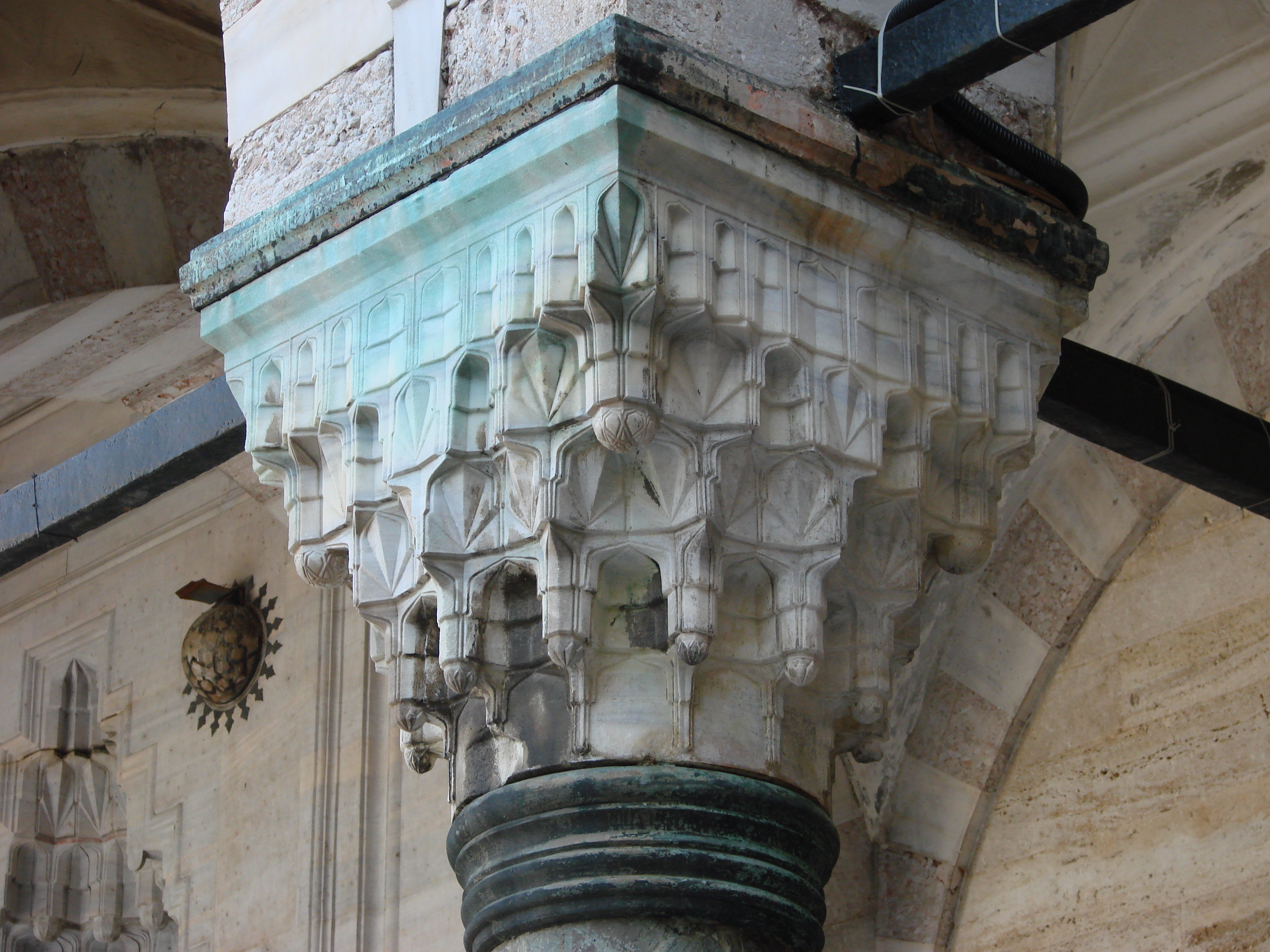
One of the muqarnas-carved capitals in the courtyard

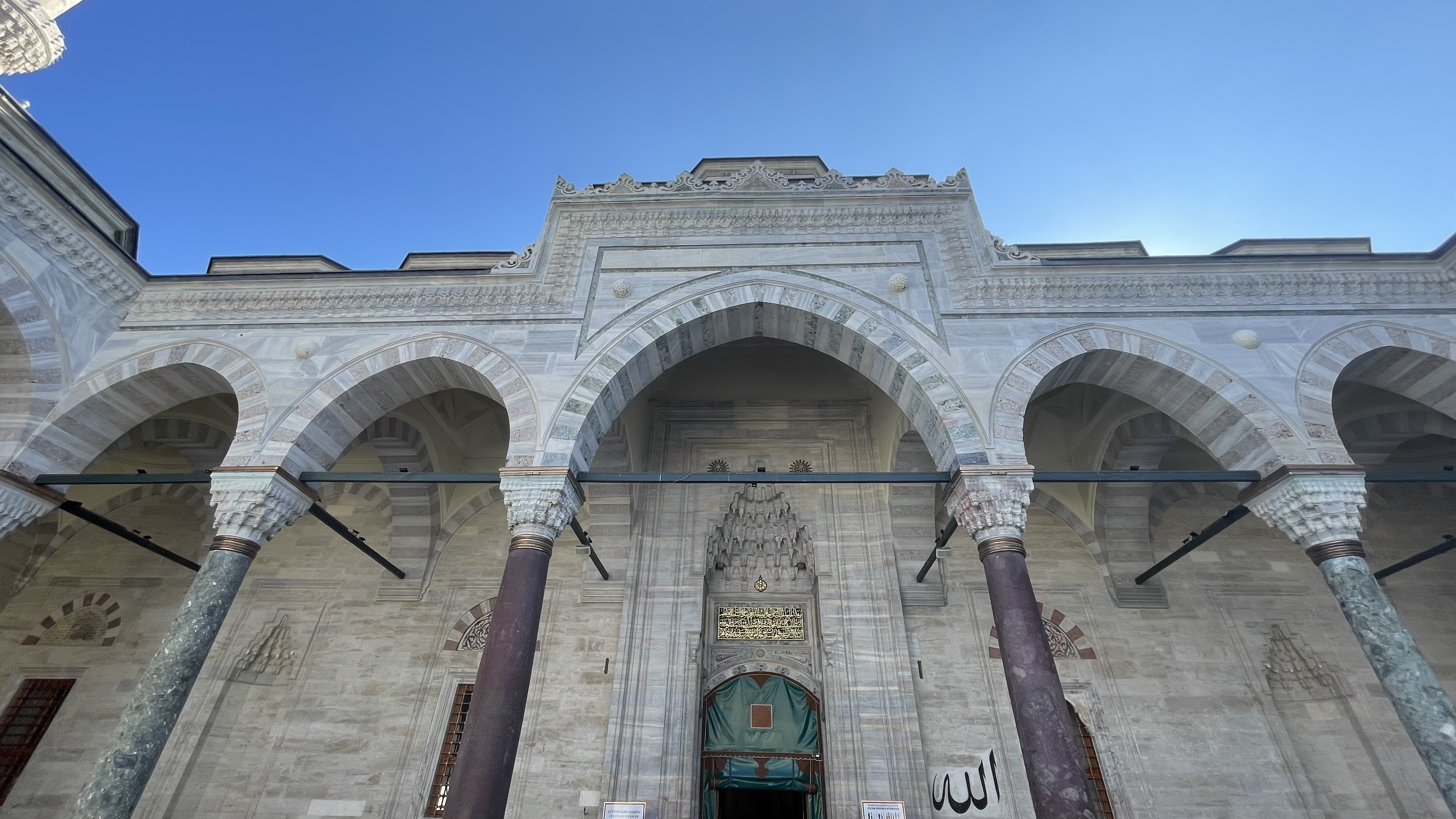
Portico and entrance to the prayer hall from the courtyard

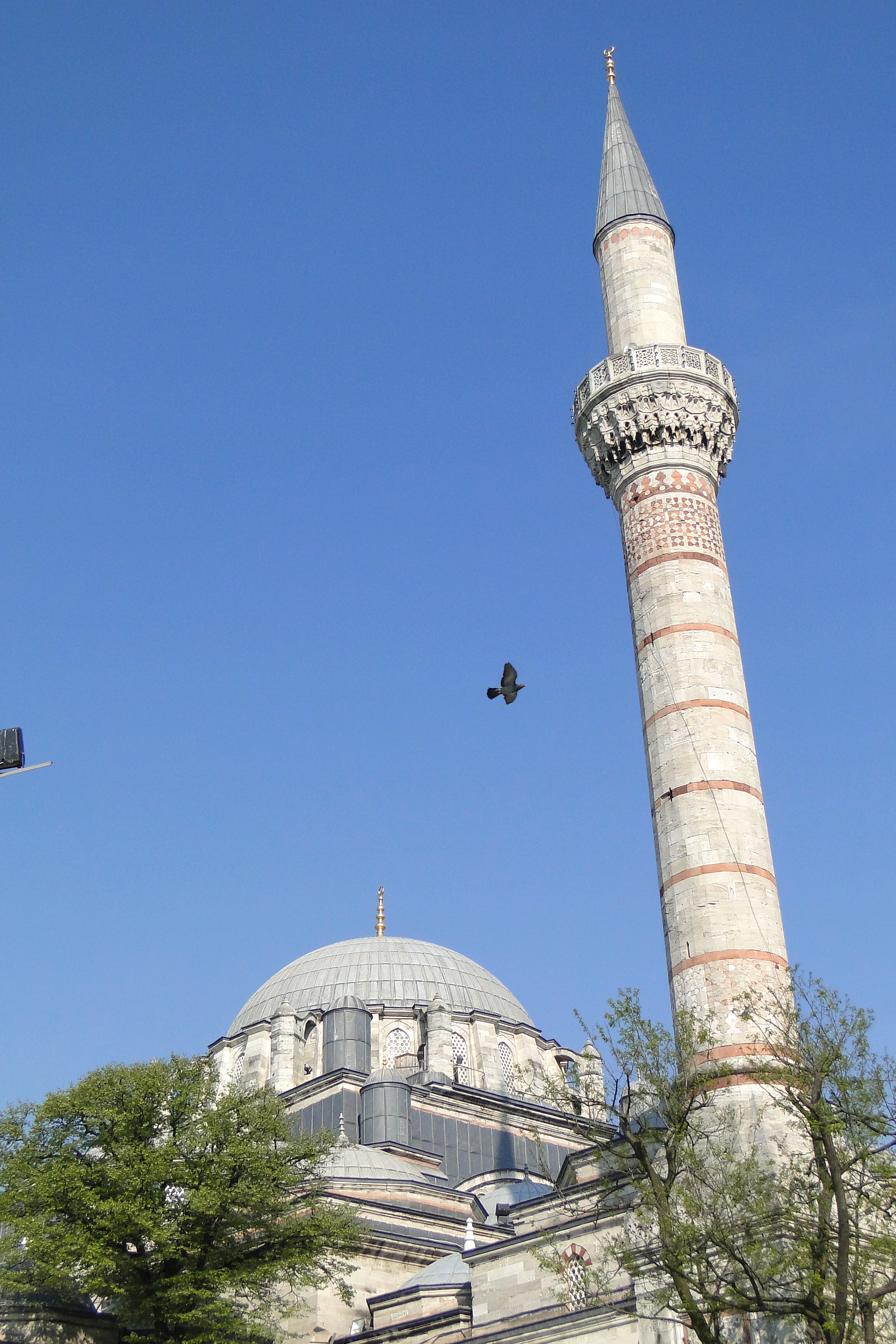
Closer view of the southwestern minaret

=== Interior ===
The mosque interior resembles a smaller scale version of the Hagia Sophia. In addition to the central dome, the semi-domes to the east and west form a nave. To the north and south there are side aisles, each with four small domes, which extend the width of the mosque, but which are not divided into galleries. The dome is supported by huge rectangular piers, with smooth pendentives and stalactite decorations. The space is lit with twenty windows at the base of the dome and seven windows on each semi-dome, in addition to two tiers of windows on the walls. An elevated sultan's loge (hünkâr mahfili), located to the right of the mihrab, is supported by ten small marble columns which were reused from earlier Byzantine churches.

On the west side, a broad extended corridor extends considerably beyond the main structure of the building. Originally designed as four domed cells to serve as a hospice for wandering dervishes, the wings were integrated into the prayer hall in the sixteenth century and now consist of three consecutive rooms separated by archways. At the ends of these wings are the two minarets.

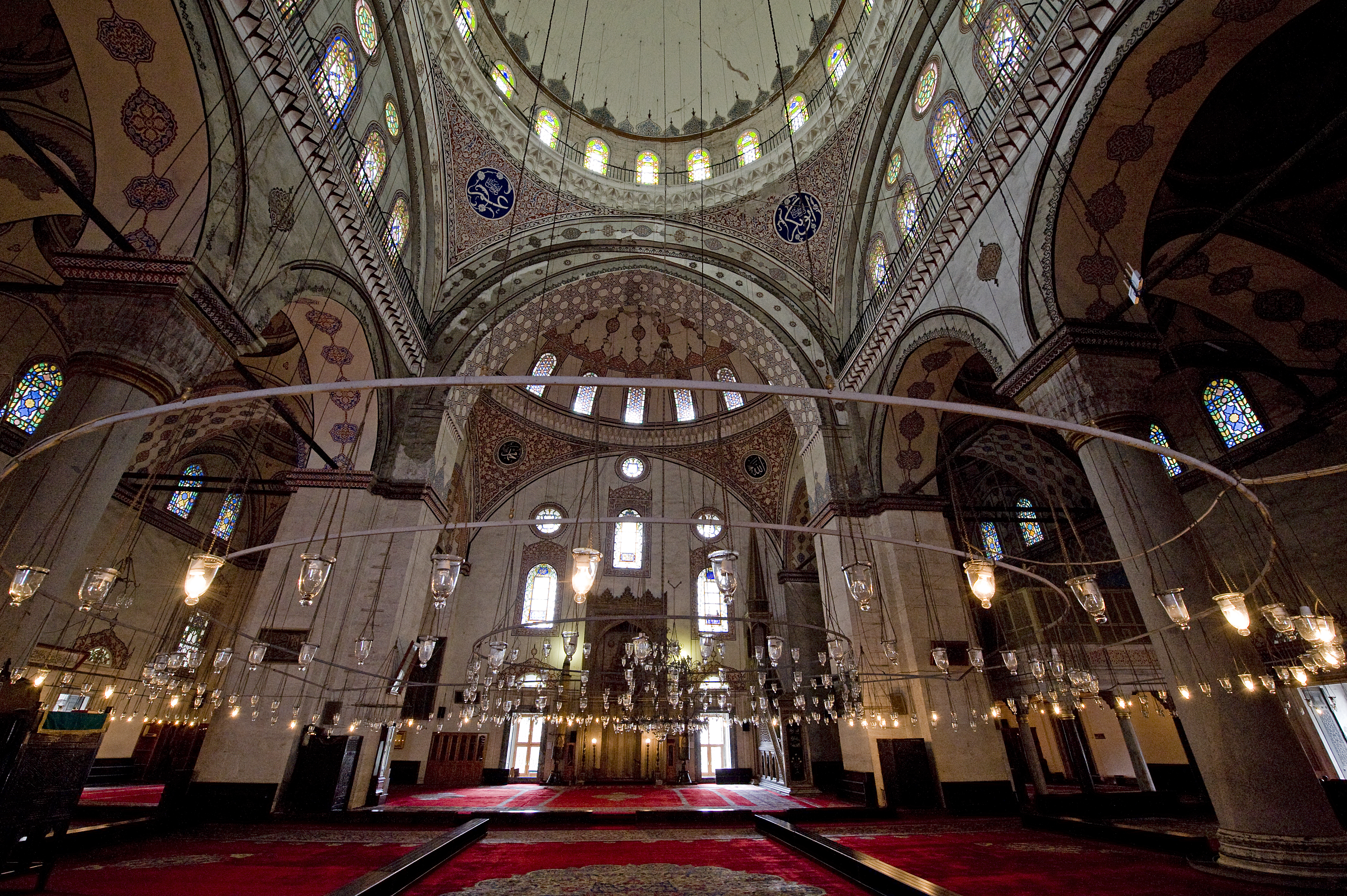
Interior of the mosque, looking towards the mihrab

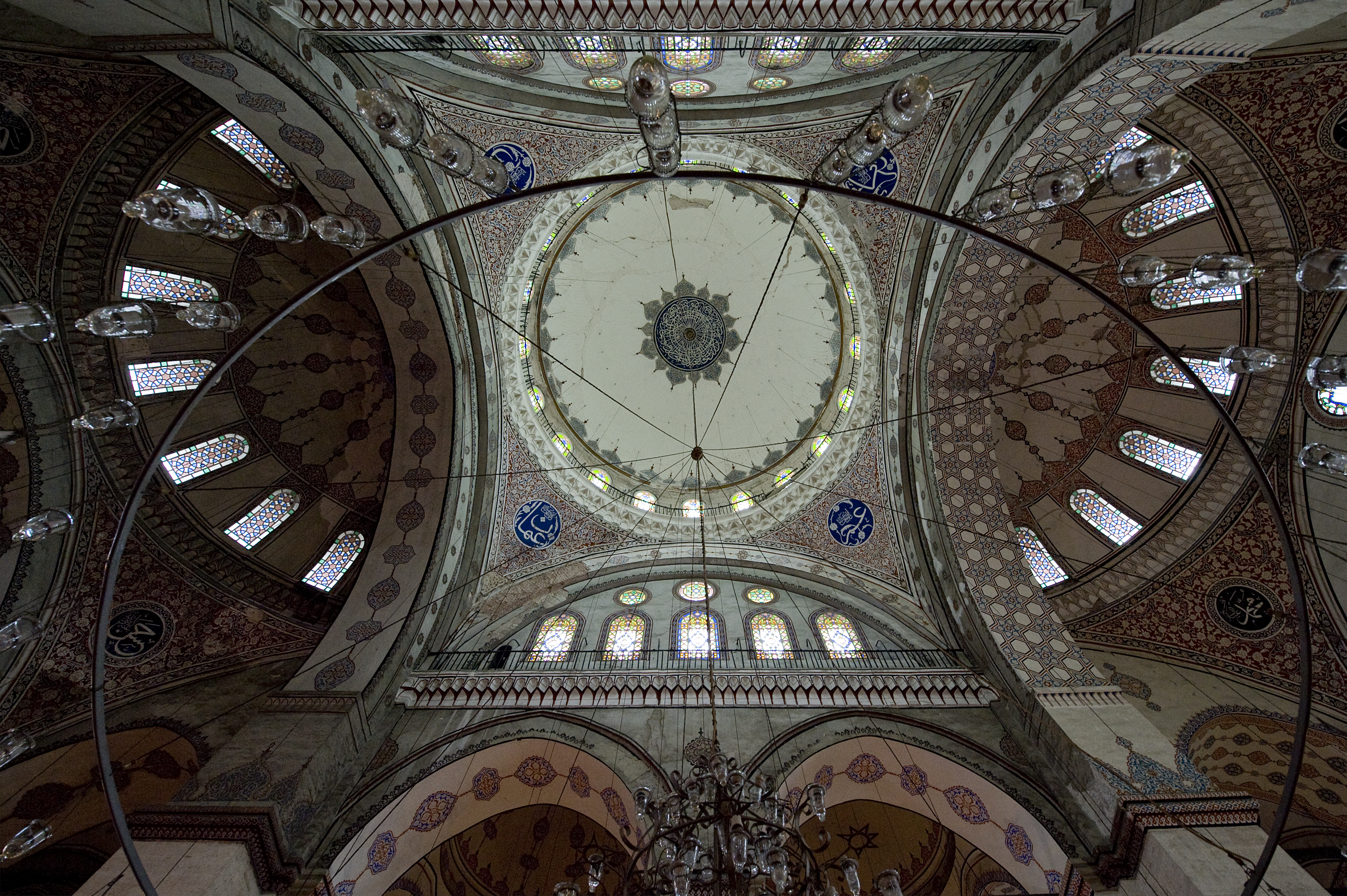
The mosque's central dome and semi-domes

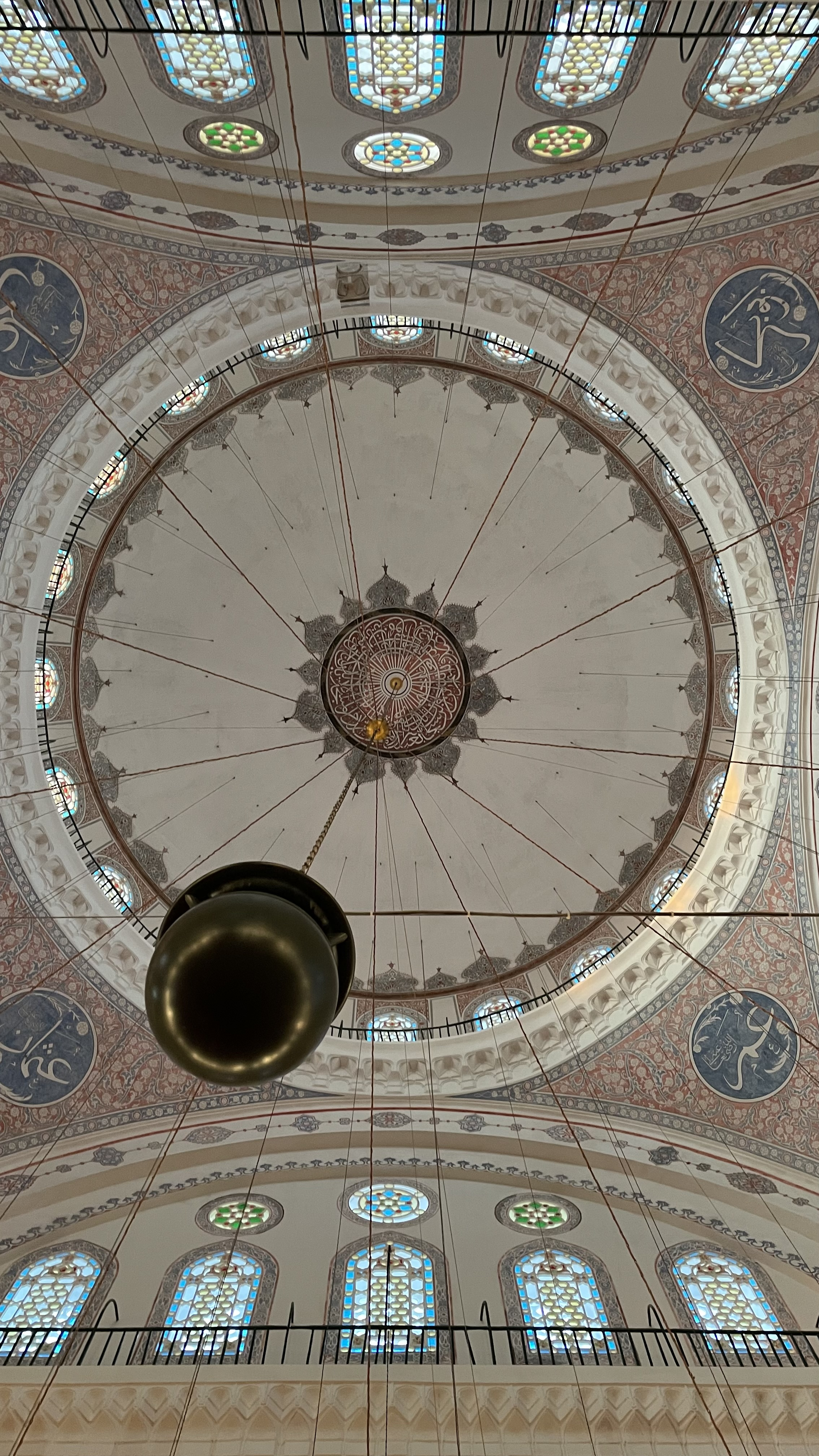
Closer view of the central dome

=== Other parts of the complex ===
Behind the mosque is a small garden, containing the türbe (tombs) of Sultan Bayezid II, his daughter Selçuk Hatun, and Grand Vizier Koca Mustafa Reşid Pasha. Below the garden is an arcade of shops (arasta), designed by Mimar Sinan in 1580, whose rents were originally intended to support the mosque. It was extensively restored in the 1960s.

In 1882 the former soup kitchen was converted into the State Library of Istanbul by Sultan Abdulhamid II; it now houses over 120,000 books and 7000 manuscripts.

The former medrese now houses a small Museum of Turkish Calligraphy Art that has been closed to the public for more than a decade. In 2022 this was undergoing restoration.

The monumental Bayezid II Hamam was restored in the 2000s and early 2010s before being reopened as the Museum of Turkish Hamam Culture in 2015. Embedded in the lowest part of the walls are fragments of sculpture from the lost triumphal arch from the Forum of Theodosius, more remains of which are scattered on the ground across the road from the mosque. During restoration of the hamam traces of an old Byzantine church beneath the hamam were uncovered.

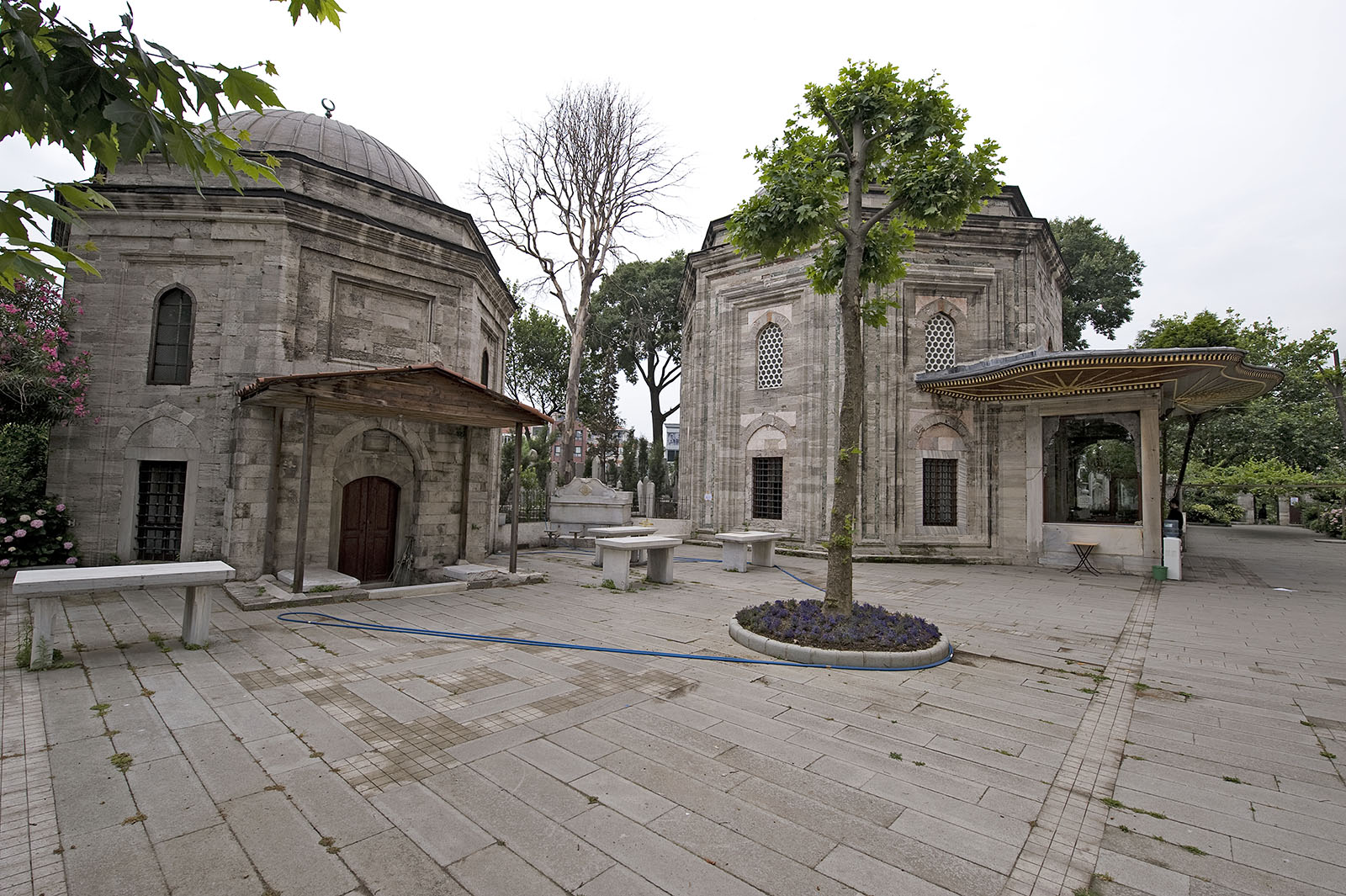
Cemetery and mausoleums; Bayezid II's mausoleum is on the right

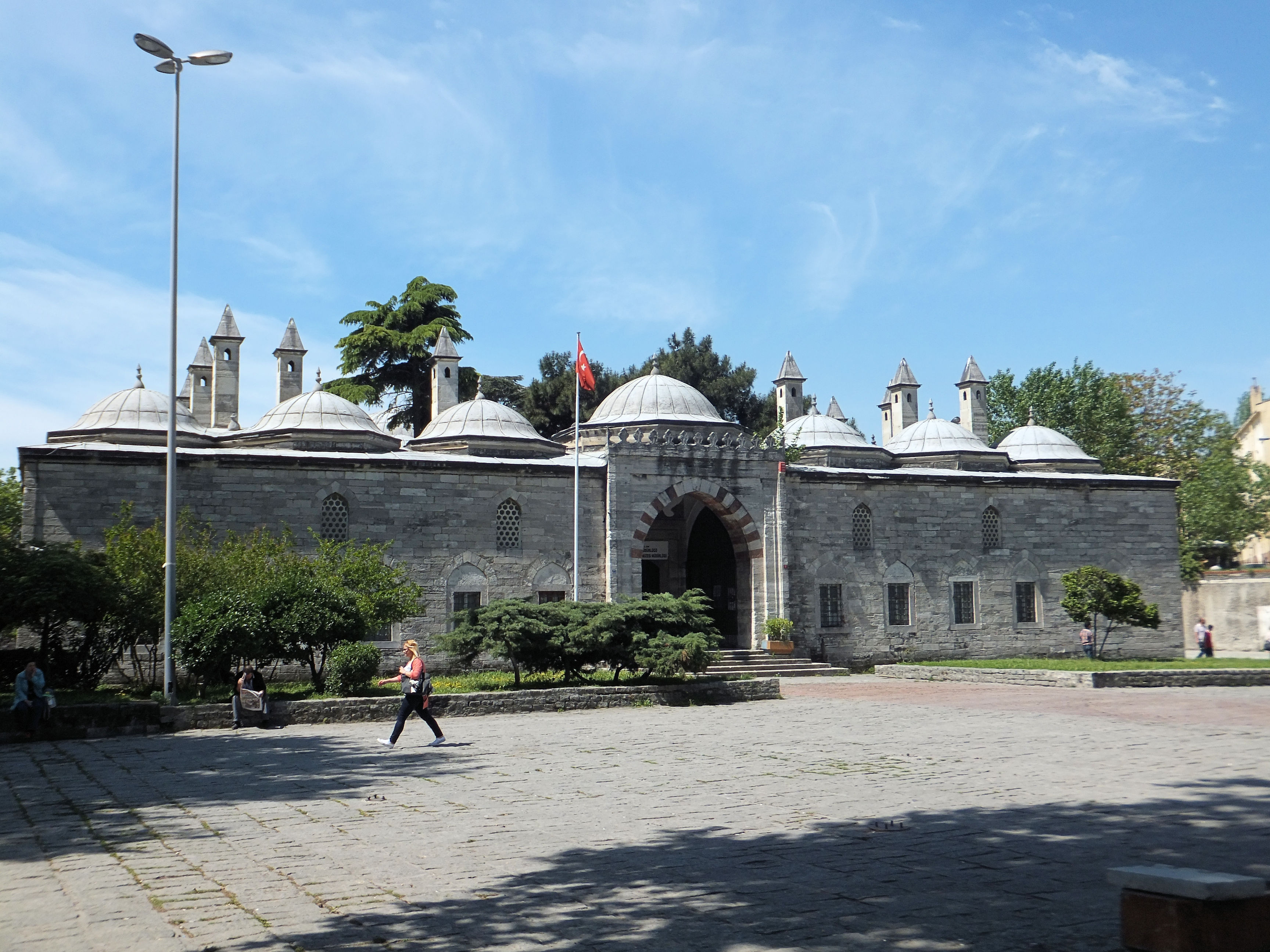
The medrese of the complex (converted to a museum)

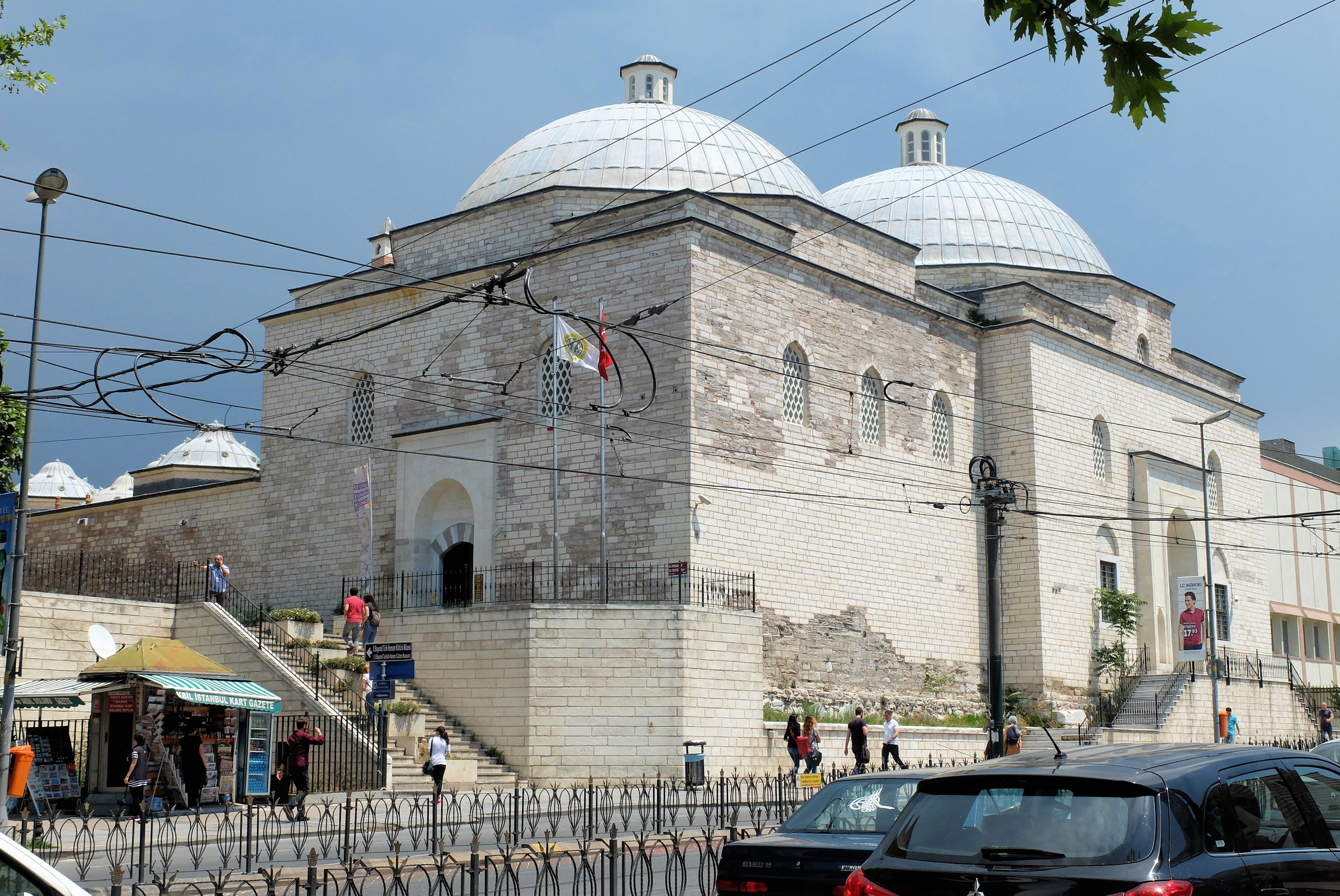
The Bayezid II Hamam (now a museum)

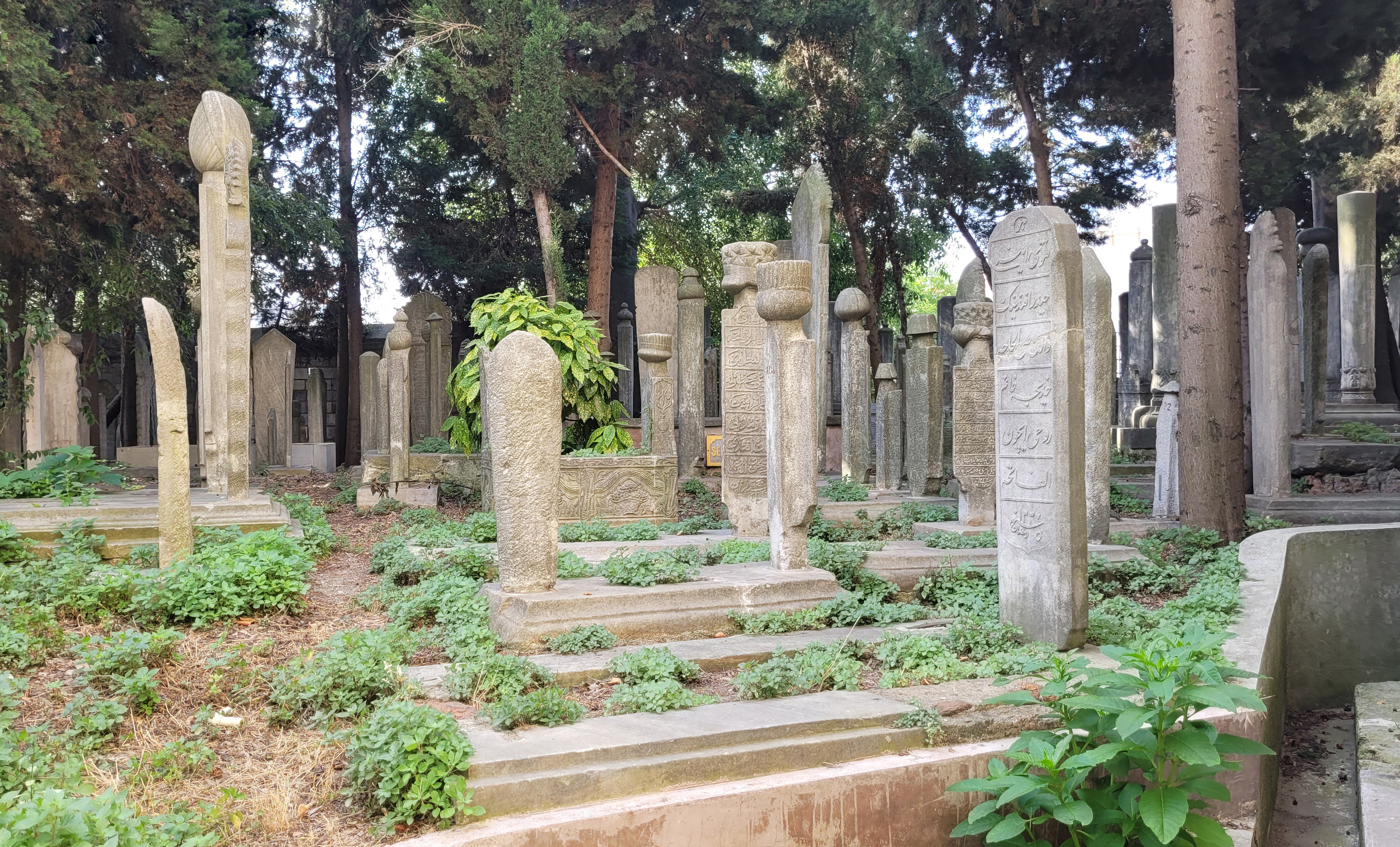
The cemetery near the mosque

== See also ==
- Islamic architecture
- List of mosques
- Ottoman architecture
