= Fener =

Quarter of Istanbul, Turkey

- Quarter
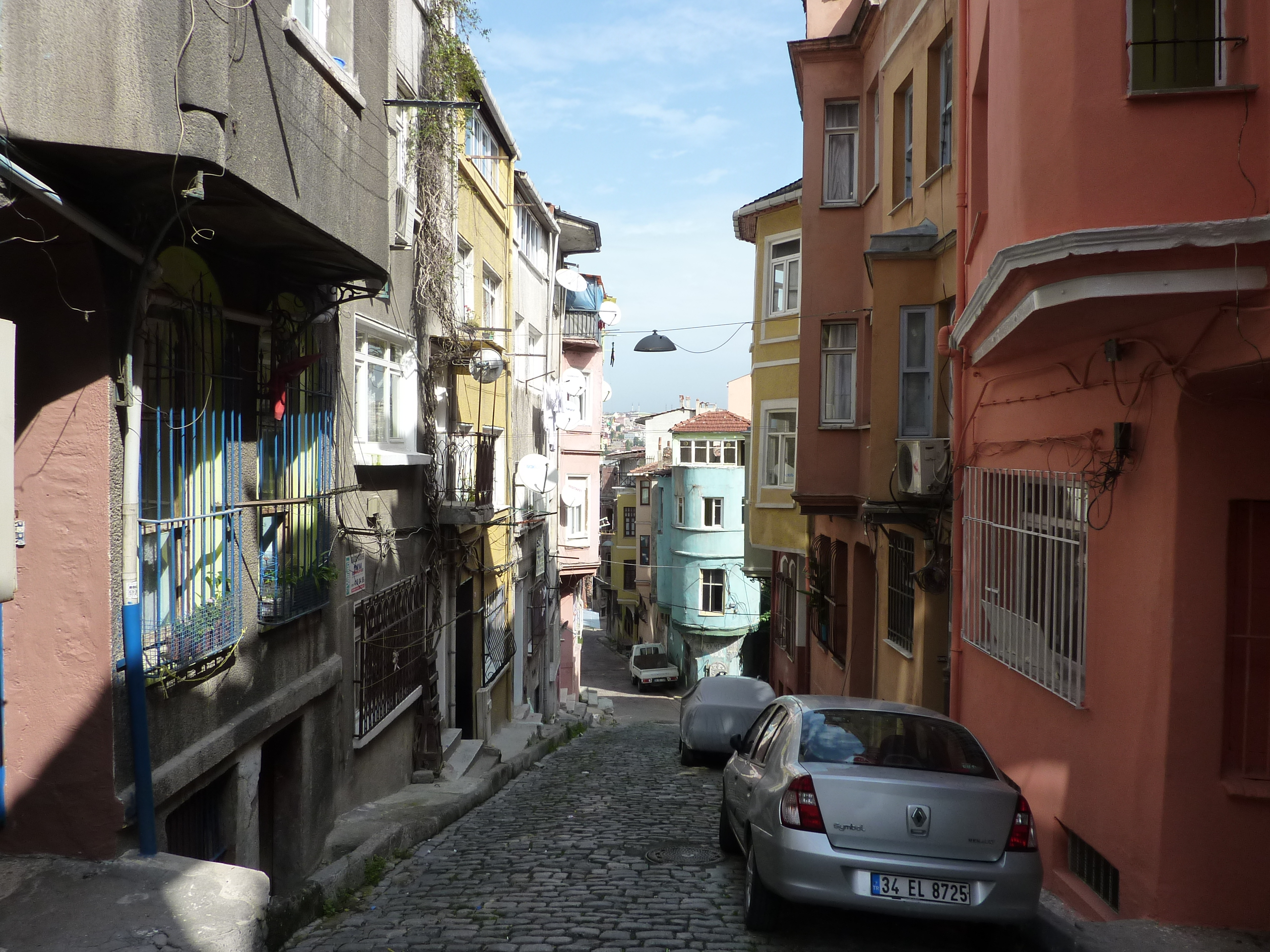
- A street in Fener

- Location within Istanbul Fatih
- Coordinates: 41°01′44.00″N 28°57′07″E
- Country: Turkey
- Region: Marmara
- Province: Istanbul
- District: Fatih
- Time zone: UTC+3 (TRT)
- Area code: 0-212

Fener (Turkish pronunciation: [feˈnæɾ]; Greek: Φανάρι, romanized: Phanári), also spelled Phanar, is a quarter midway up the Golden Horn in the district of Fatih in Istanbul, Turkey. The Turkish name is derived from the Greek word "phanarion" (Medieval Greek: Φανάριον), meaning lantern, streetlight or lamppost; the neighborhood was so called because of a column topped with a lantern which stood here in the Byzantine period and was used as a street light or lighthouse.

Fener was a traditionally Greek neighbourhood during the Ottoman era and its streets still contain many old stone houses and churches dating from Byzantine and Ottoman times. The grand mansions between the main road and the shore of the Golden Horn were often used to store wood imported from the Black Sea (Pontos) area; one now houses Istanbul's Women's Library. Their picturesque façades were damaged as a result of street-widening work from the 1930s onwards.

Fener is sandwiched between Cibali and Balat on the southern shore of the Golden Horn. The steep hills behind it run up to the Fatih neighbourhood.

Fener is served by the T5 tram line which links it with Eminönü and the small bus terminal (for buses to Anatolia) at Alibeyköy. The Golden Horn ferry also stops at Fener, linking it to Üsküdar, Karaköy, Kasımpaşa, Balat, Ayvansaray, Hasköy, Sütlüce and Eyüp.

== History ==
After the Fall of Constantinople in 1453, Fener became home to many of the Greeks living in the city. The Patriarchate of Constantinople also moved here and remains here today. As a result, the term "Phanar" is sometimes used as a shorthand reference to the Ecumenical Patriarchate, just as "Vatican" is used for the Holy See of the Roman Catholic Church.

During the Ottoman period, the Greek inhabitants of Fener were called Phanariotes and often served the Sultan in important roles. Wealthy Phanariotes often served as dragomans (translators) or became the governors of provinces in the Balkans and Greece. Several served as hospodars of Wallachia and Moldavia between 1711 and 1821.

During WWI, the area was affected by the British bombing of Istanbul.

== Attractions ==
Fener's most notable attraction is the walled compound that encloses the Patriarchal Church of St. George, home to the patriarch who is still head of the Ecumenical Patriarchate of Constantinople, one of fifteen to seventeen independent jurisdictions of the Eastern Orthodox Church. The current holder of the office is Patriarch Bartholomew I. The patriarchate moved here in 1602 but a fire in 1720 destroyed the original basilican church on the site. Another fire in 1941 did further damage to the older buildings in the compound; aside from the church itself and the brick-and-stone library at the end of the garden most of what a visitor sees today is fairly new. The Middle Gate (Orta Kapı) leading into the compound has been sealed since the then Patriarch was hanged there in 1821 when Greece rebelled against Ottoman suzerainty. Crowds, including visitors from Athens, flock here for the celebration of Greek Orthodox Easter.

The Church of St Mary of the Mongols (Panagia Muhliotissa, Theotokos Panagiotussa), inland and uphill from the Patriarchate, is interesting as the one church in Constantinople that was never turned into a mosque, even after the Conquest of Istanbul in 1453. The architect Atik Sinan (not to be confused with the better known Mimar Sinan) is said to have persuaded Sultan Mehmet II to allow it to continue providing services for the Greek population and a copy of the ferman (edict) decreeing this still hangs on the church wall.

Near the Church of St Mary of the Mongols is the huge red-brick Phanar Greek Orthodox College. The historian Dimitri Cantemir was a student here in the 17th century. Today it has only a tiny number of pupils. A second Greek school in Fener, the Maraşlı Greek Orthodox Primary School, is also an imposing building but no longer has any pupils.

Battered remnants of the Sea Walls that used to close Constantinople off from the Golden Horn still skirt Fener. The Ayakapı gate through the walls is believed to have been designed by Mimar Sinan in 1562.

The back streets of Fener are full of two and three-storied terraced houses often with cumbas (bay windows) as well as a handful of much grander houses. Many have been converted to house cafes, restaurants and tourist accommodation.

=== Blessing of the Waters ===
As elsewhere in the Orthodox world, every 6 January - the Feast of the Epiphany - a ceremony called the Blessing of the Waters take place in which a priest tosses a cross into water and swimmers race to see who can bring it back to shore first. In Istanbul this ceremony is performed by the Patriarch who tosses a cross into the Golden Horn to be retrieved by the swimmers.

== Gallery ==
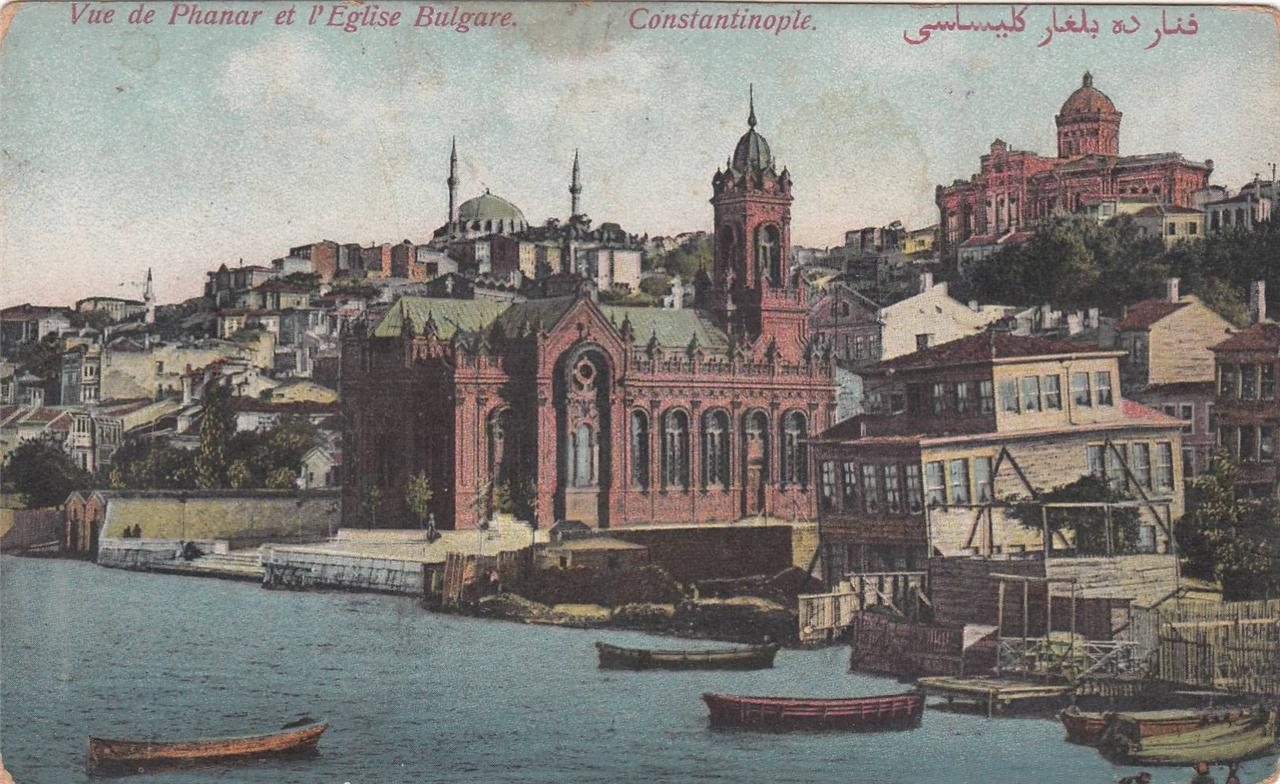
Fener district in c. 1900.

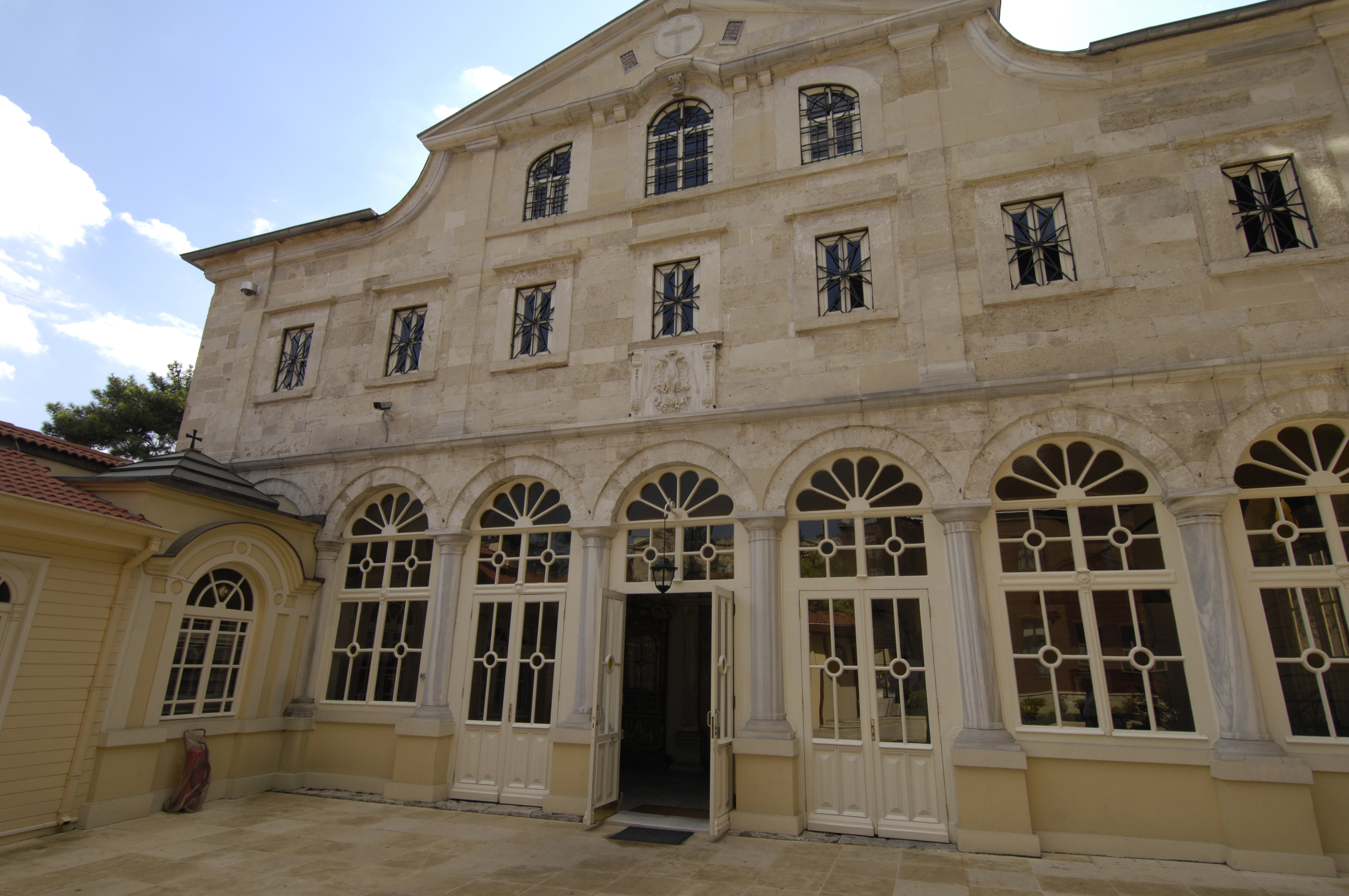
Exterior of St. George's Cathedral. The neo-Classical façade marks it out from other Orthodox churches in the Byzantine style.

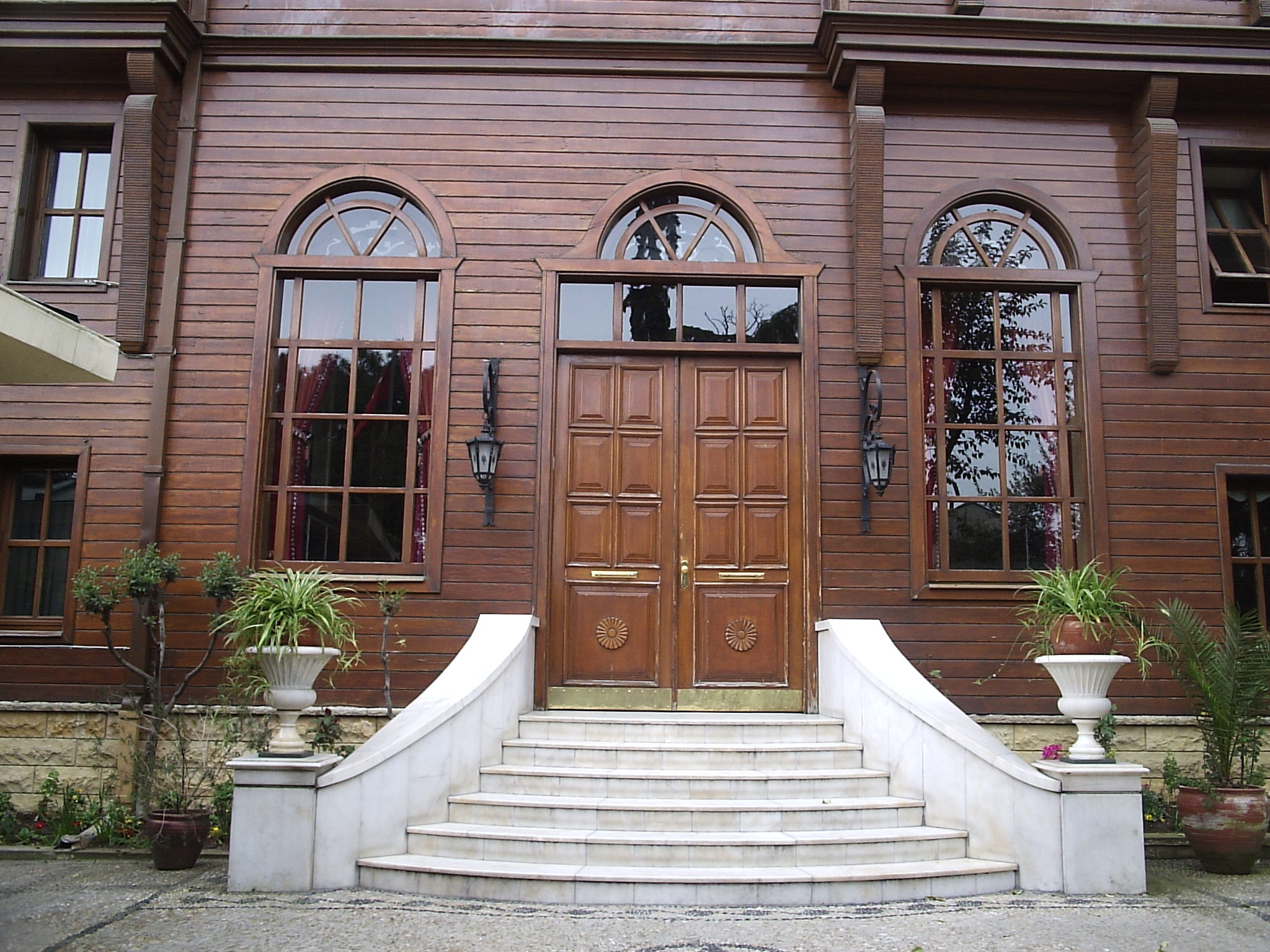
Residence of the patriarch in the Ecumenical Patriarchate of Constantinople in Fener.

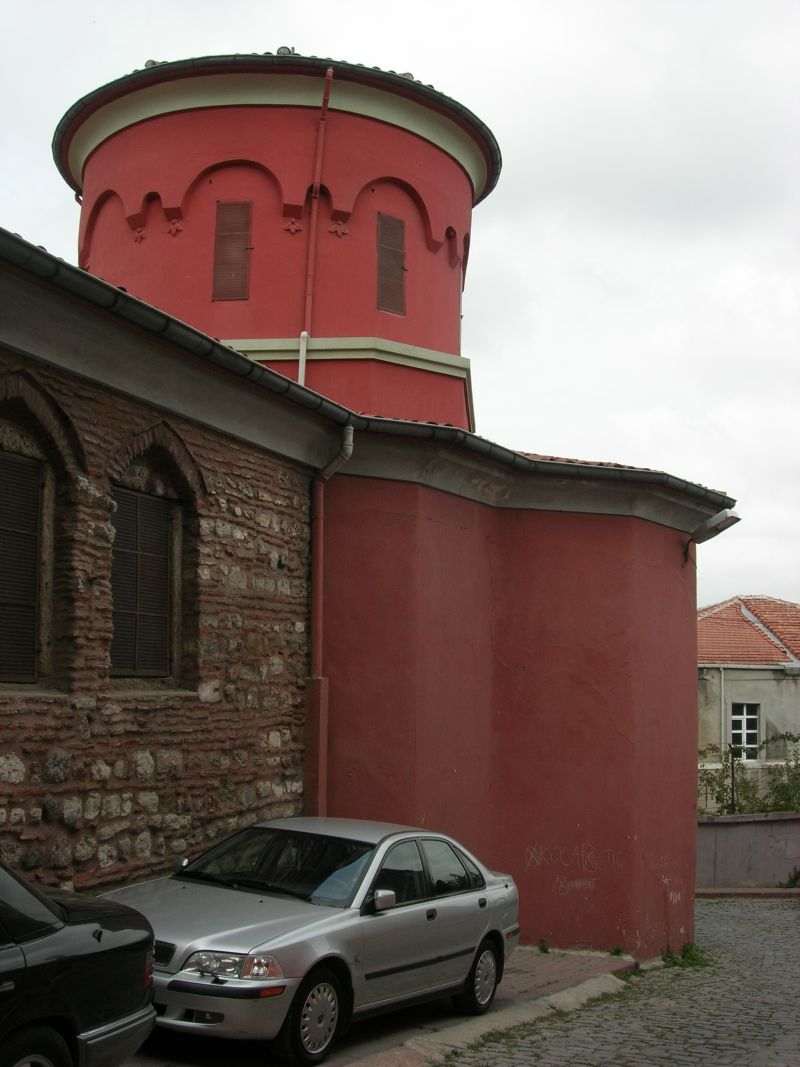
The Church of Saint Mary of the Mongols viewed from South.

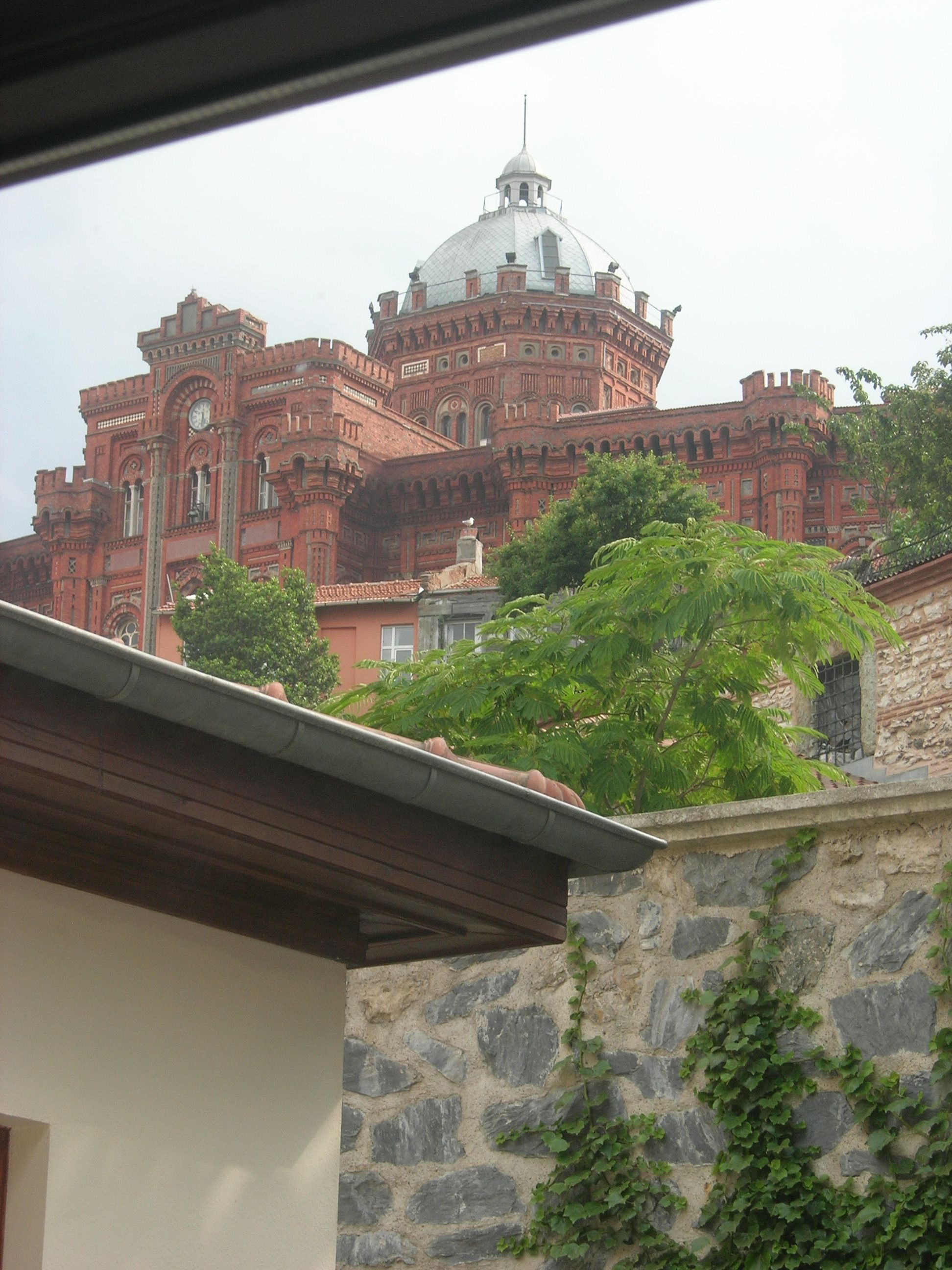
The Phanar Greek Orthodox College seen from a Rum house in Vodina Caddesi.

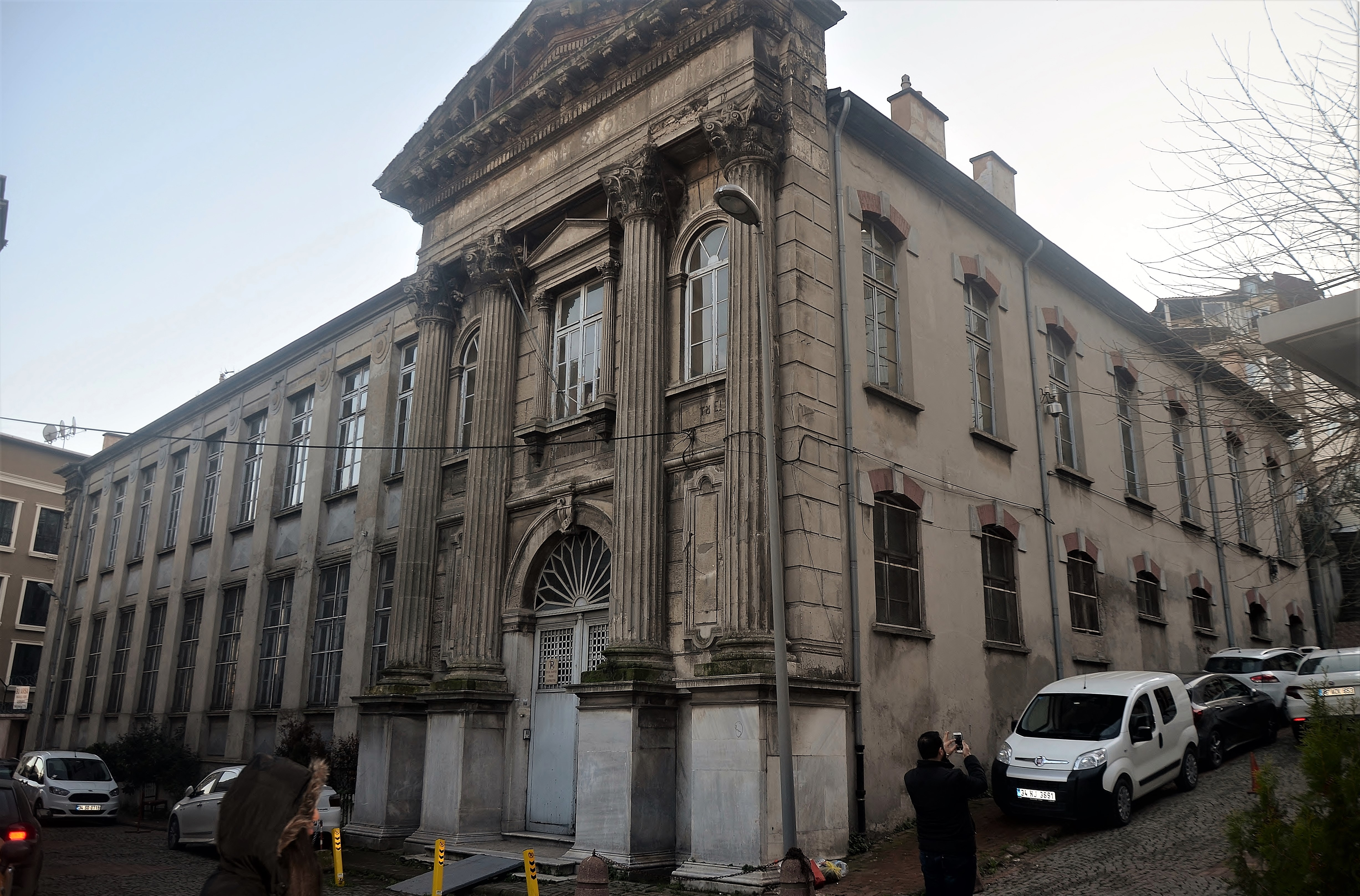
Maraşlı Greek Orthodox Primary School. Built in the Ottoman era and funded by Grigorios Maraslis, it is not in use today

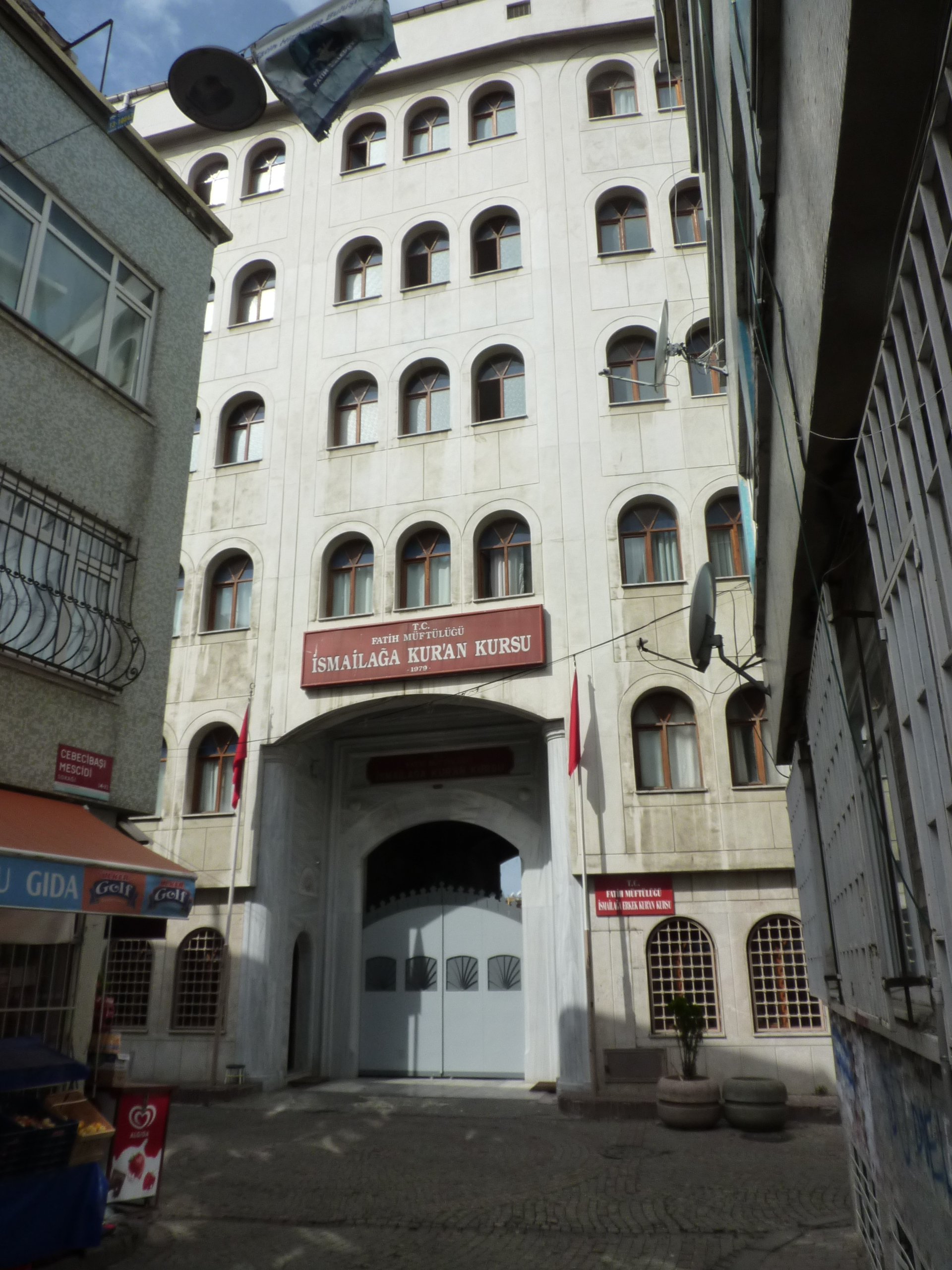
A madrasa in Fener.

== See also ==
- Bulgarian iron church of St. Stephen of the Bulgars
- Greeks in Turkey
- Greektown
- Phanar Greek Orthodox College
