= Atik Sinan =

Ottoman architect

Sinan-i Atik, also known as Azadlı Sinan, and Atik Sinan (meaning Sinan the Freedman; azadlı shows that atik does not mean "old", and is used to distinguish him from Koca Mimar Sinan Agha), was a Greek Ottoman architect for Sultan Mehmed II from the empire's Greek community during the 15th century.

== Biography ==
He is credited with being the architect who designed and built Istanbul's first selatin mosque, the Fatih Mosque and its complex, in 1471 for Mehmed II, over the ruins of the Church of the Holy Apostles, which was razed to the ground by the Ottomans in order for the mosque to be built. His nephew, also an architect, built the Bayezid II Mosque. Tradition holds that Sultan Mehmed II endowed the Greek Orthodox Church of St. Mary of the Mongols, the only pre-conquest church in Istanbul still standing that was never converted into a mosque, to the mother of Christodoulos (Sinan's Greek name) in acknowledgment of his work. This grant was confirmed by Bayazid II, in recognition of the services of the nephew of Christodoulos, who built the mosque bearing that sultan's name.

Legend has it that because the architect failed to make the dome of the mosque bigger and higher than the Byzantine Hagia Sophia cathedral, the disappointed and angered Mehmed II amputated the hand of the architect. Sinan complained to the city judge (kadhi), who ruled what the sultan did was unjust and judged that the architect could amputate the sultan's hand in return. Seeing the sultan submit to the judge's order, the Greek architect was amazed with Muslim justice, pardoned the sultan, and converted to Islam. The sultan rewarded Sinan by giving him the ownership of a whole street, a gift recognized by Ahmed III three centuries later.

== Architectural influence ==
Atik Sinan designed and oversaw the construction of “one of the most important historical monuments in Istanbul” – the Fatih Mosque and its Külliye, meaning complex. In addition to being the first large selatin mosque in the city, it was also the first large building in the Ottoman imperial architectural tradition constructed in the recently captured Constantinople. Atik Sinan named the structure for the man who commissioned his work – Mehmed the Conqueror, as the word Conqueror translates to “Fatih” in Turkish.

Atik Sinan began construction for the complex in 1463 and completed the project in 1471. Its location – on the site of the recently destroyed Byzantine Church of the Holy Apostles, and its status as the first major mosque construction in the city rendered it “an effective center for the radiation of Ottoman urbanization.” Architecturally, Atik Sinan drew inspiration from other Turkoman mosques as well as the Hagia Sophia. The mosque had a more simple design than its grand Byzantine inspiration, as it featured only one central dome supported by a single semi-dome above the qibla. The earthquake on 22 May 1766 destroyed the original mosque, though the reconstruction, overseen by Sultan Mustafa III, has been in place since 1771.

The Fatih Mosque's Külliye is also of great architectural significance. Atik Sinan constructed a massive complex spreading from the east and west sides of the mosques. The complex included a library, a soup kitchen, a hospital, a hospice, a library, no less than eight madrasas, and the eventual tombs of both Mehmed II and his wife. The medical complexes were largely staffed by Jewish doctors, demonstrating the religious syncretism of the city and the empire as a whole. The madrasas Atik Sinan constructed marked an important shift in education in the Ottoman Empire, as they served as a new center for religious and judicial training in the capital as opposed to the more distant training centers in Cairo. The tombs were also significant, as they legitimized Mehmed II's claim to the title of “Kayser-i Rum (Caesar of Rome)” and further “Ottomanized the city.” The Fatih Mosque's Külliye never fully succumbed to the earthquake damage that destroyed the mosque itself, and thus remains largely as Atik Sinan built it - “preserved in its original form.”
