= Odalar Mosque =

Mosque in Istanbul, Turkey

Odalar mosque
- Odalar Câmîi
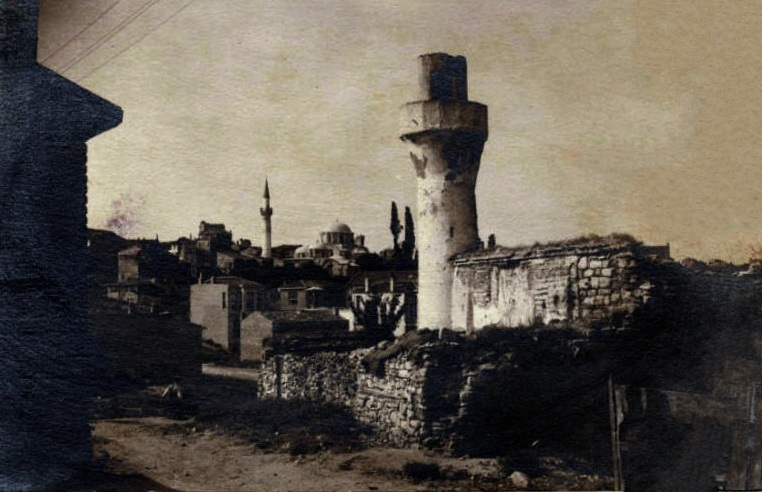
- The Mosque seen from East with Kariye Mosque in the background after the fire of 1919

- Location within Istanbul Fatih
- Former names: Santa Maria di Costantinopoli

General information
- Status: Destroyed
- Type: Church
- Architectural style: Middle Byzantine - Comnenian
- Location: Müftu Sokaĝi 20-22, Istanbul, Turkey
- Coordinates: 41.029071°N 28.939828°E
- Destroyed: July 2nd, 1919

Technical details
- Structural system: Cross-in-square

The Odalar Mosque (Turkish: Odalar Câmîi, meaning "the mosque of the barracks" after the nearby accommodations of the married Janissaries established in this quarter in the 18th century. Also: Kemankeş Mustafa Paşa Câmîi) was an Ottoman mosque in Istanbul. The building was originally a Byzantine-era Eastern Orthodox church of unknown dedication. In 1475, after the Fall of Constantinople (1453), it became a Roman Catholic church, dedicated to Saint Mary of Constantinople, until finally it was converted into a mosque by the Ottomans in 1640. The mosque was destroyed by fire in 1919, and since then has fallen into ruin. As of 2011, only some walls remain, hidden among modern buildings.

== Location ==
The ruins of the building lie in Istanbul, in the district of Fatih, in the neighborhood of Salmatomruk, not far from Edirne Kapı (the ancient Gate of Charisius), more or less halfway between the Chora Church and the Fethiye Mosque. The few remains lie in a courtyard and can be accessed through modern blocks built on Müftu Sokaĝi 20-22.

== History ==
=== Byzantine Age ===
Between the ninth and the tenth century a church with an underlying basement and a crypt was erected on the top of the sixth hill of Constantinople, on a plateau which is limited by the open air cistern of Aetius (now a football field) and by the unidentified Byzantine edifice denominated in Ottoman times as Boĝdan Saray. The dedication of this building is uncertain, but it was probably part of a complex which also included today's Kasım Ağa Mosque and the İpek Cistern, and was almost certainly the katholikon of a monastery.

The edifice has been identified for a long time as the Theotokos en te Petra, but without conclusive evidence. During the Byzantine period, several monasteries lay in the area; the Monastery of Manuel, that devoted to St. John in Petra, and the Kecharitomene nunnery ("full of grace" or "favoured (by God)"). The latter was founded at the beginning of the 12th century by Empress Eirene Doukaina, and is known above all because of its detailed and extant typikon. The nearby church of the Theotokos tes Kellararias, used by the nuns of the Kecharitomene as a burial place, and that of Hagios Nikolaos, both mentioned in the typikon of the nunnery, are possible candidates for the identification. Moreover, the Odalar Mosque could also be identified with a nearby church dedicated to Saints Sergius and Bacchus, which lay "near the cistern of Aetios": not to be confounded with the homonymous church which lies near Hagia Sophia) because of the discovery in the vicinity of a monogrammed capital (unfortunately found not in situ). Between 1150 and 1175 a new church of the cross-in-square plan was built above the old one (possibly destroyed by fire or menaced by a landslide).

=== Ottoman Age ===
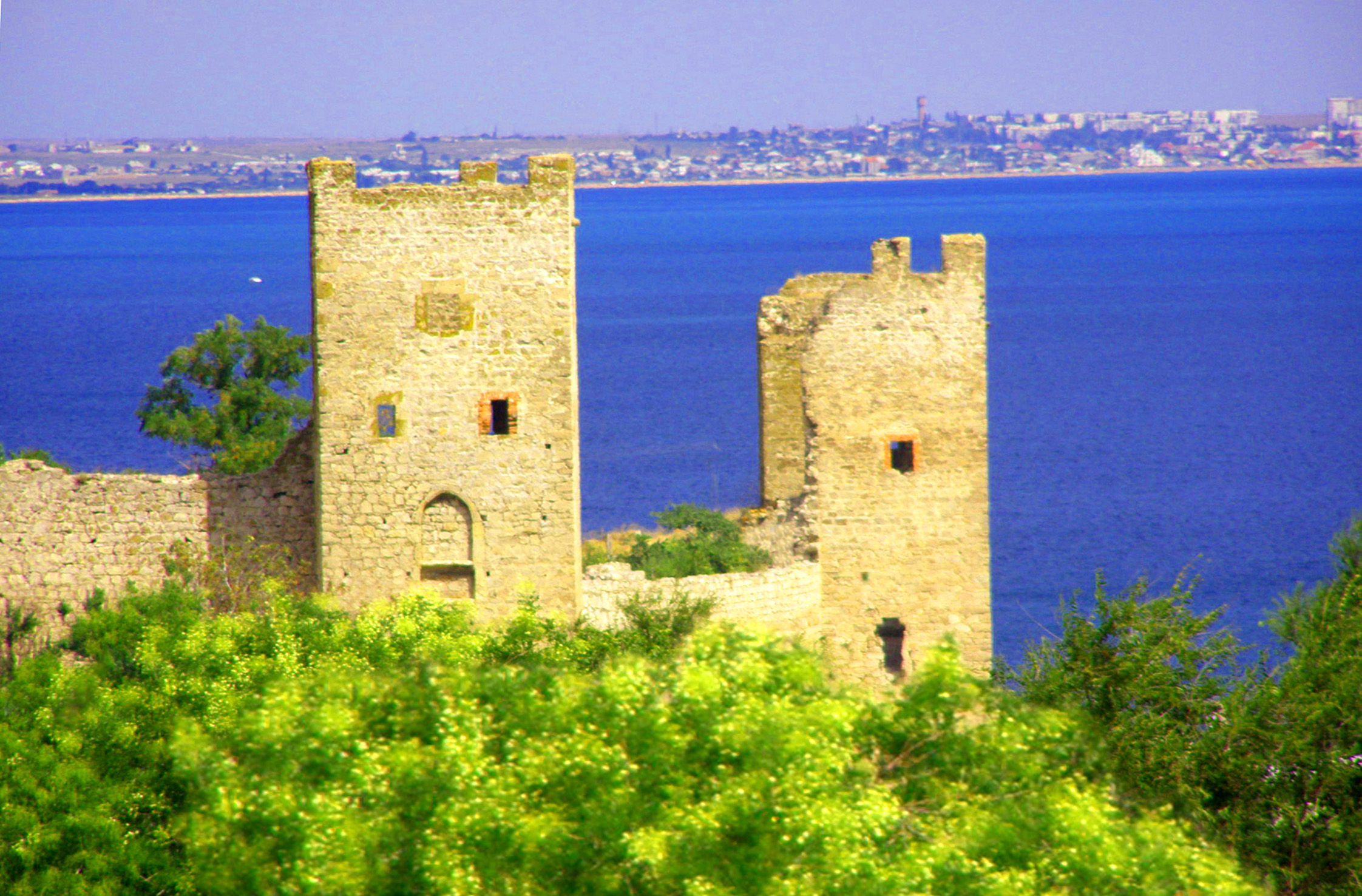
The Genoese Fortress of Caffa. From here were deported the Italians which populated the Kefeli Mahalle in Istanbul

The documented history of the edifice begins in 1475, shortly after the Fall of Constantinople, when Sultan Mehmed II conquered the Genoese colony of Caffa, in Crimea. About 40,000 Latin, Greek, Armenian and Jewish inhabitants who lived in Caffa ("Caffariotes" or, in Turkish, Kefeli) were then deported to Istanbul and relocated to this quarter, which was named after them Kefe Mahallesi. The Latins, mainly Genoese, were authorized to use in their quarter as churches the building and, together with the Armenians, another edifice known later as Kefeli Mosque, which was dedicated to Saint Nicholas.

The edifice, dedicated then to Saint Mary of Constantinople (Italian: Santa Maria di Costantinopoli), was officiated by the Dominicans, which before the Ottoman conquest had also a monastery in the city on the Black Sea. Here was brought from Caffa a large icon of the Hodegetria type, which now is kept in the Dominican monastery of SS. Peter and Paul in Galata. Due to all that, at the beginning of the sixteenth century the church of Saint Mary had turned into the center of this quarter predominantly inhabited by Italians, but the building fell soon in disrepair. Under Sultan Murad IV (r. 1623–1640) the decision was taken to exclude from the walled city the Christians who were not Ottoman subjects and to resettle them in Galata and Pera. As a consequence, and after riots between Christian and Muslims, the church was closed in 1636, and in 1640 it was transformed into a mosque by Sadrazam (Grand Vizier) Kemankeş Mustafa Pasha (d. 1644). As mentioned above, only the Hodegetria Icon could be moved with great difficulties to Galata.

After the relocation of the married Janissaries in the quarter in 1782, the mosque got the appellation of Odalar (In Turkish "Oda" means "room" but also "barrack of the Janissaries"). Previously these were lodged at the Eski Odalar ("Old Barracks") near Şehzade Mosque, which were destroyed in the fire of 1782. The building decayed steadily (by the mid-19th century the dome had collapsed), and it was heavily damaged by the fire of Salmatomruk on 2 July 1919. When the quarter was rebuilt with modern criteria the edifice was not restored, and fell into ruin.

== Architecture ==
As mentioned above, several constructive phases can be recognized in the building during the Byzantine period. The first church, erected in the middle Byzantine age, had an almost square plan (about 11.65 m x 10 m ) with three apses, and was oriented toward the East. In 1935, only the tripartite sanctuary and the Bema were still visible. The church was built on a basement composed of 24 vaulted rooms and a vaulted crypt with an apse, which is supposed to have been a chapel containing relics. These rooms had at first a profane usage, later they were used as burial place and finally as a cistern.

The second church, erected at the end of the twelfth century, used also 16 small rooms of the abandoned first church's basement as substructure. The masonry was made of stone and bricks, and was erected with the technique of the recessed brick, typical of the Byzantine architecture of the middle period. In this technique, alternate courses of bricks are mounted behind the line of the wall, and are plunged in a mortar's bed. Due to that, the thickness of the mortar layers is about three times greater than that of the bricks layers. In this building, three or four rows of bricks alternate with single rows of stones, and the bricks are arranged to form several patterns.

The second church was of the cross-in-square type with an almost square naos about 10.5 m wide: it had four columns sustaining the dome through pendentives, three apses - the central one having a polygonal shape - and a narthex embracing the edifice on the west and north sides. The dome was about 4.4. m wide, lay on a drum and was adorned with frescoes. East of the naos lay a tripartite sanctuary composed of a bema flanked by a prothesis and a diakonikon. The floor of the new church was 3.3 m above that of the first church. The edifice can be described as a middle-sized Byzantine church, similar to the nearby Church of Christ Pantepoptes.

From a relation of Pietro Demarchis, bishop of Santorini, who visited Istanbul in 1622, we know that at that time the columns of the church had been taken away by the Turks and substituted with wooden pillars, and that the dome was covered with frescoes. Moreover, part of the building was already menacing ruin. Just after the conversion to mosque, to the building were added a mihrab, a minbar and a minaret. After the fire of 1919, the building fell into ruin (the roof collapsed and the minaret crashed already in the 1820s), but luckily it was thoroughly studied and surveyed by the German Archaeologist Paul Schatzmann in 1934/1935. According to the Greek scholar Alexandros G. Paspates, in the East part of the basement of the Mosque sprung a water source (Greek: αγίασμα, hagíasma, Turkish: ayazma) dedicated to Saint John the Baptist, abandoned for a long time.

== Paintings ==
During the excavation of 1934/1935 up to four mortar layers covered with frescoes on blue background were uncovered. A fresco representing a Madonna on Throne with angels was found in the crypt. In the basement rooms were found fragments of paintings having as subject funerary themes. In the inferior church were discovered two deesis, a fresco representing the soldier Saint Mercurius - of unparalleled technique among the known Byzantine works of this age - and prophets. These paintings were executed either in the tenth or in the middle of the eleventh century, belonging so to the first church. The diakonikon of the second church was adorned with frescoes showing saints and episodes of the Life of the Virgin. The best preserved frescoes (among them Saint Mercurius) were detached, restored and are on display at the Archaeological Museum of Istanbul.

== Sources ==
- Janin, Raymond (1953). La Géographie Ecclésiastique de l'Empire Byzantin. 1. Part: Le Siège de Constantinople et le Patriarcat Oecuménique. 3rd Vol. : Les Églises et les Monastères (in French). Paris: Institut Français d'Etudes Byzantines.
- Mamboury, Ernest (1953). The Tourists' Istanbul. Istanbul: Çituri Biraderler Basımevi.
- Eyice, Semavi (1955). Istanbul. Petite Guide a travers les Monuments Byzantins et Turcs (in French). Istanbul: Istanbul Matbaası.
- Gülersoy, Çelik (1976). A Guide to Istanbul. Istanbul: Istanbul Kitaplığı. OCLC 3849706.
- Müller-Wiener, Wolfgang (1977). Bildlexikon Zur Topographie Istanbuls: Byzantion, Konstantinupolis, Istanbul Bis Zum Beginn D. 17 Jh (in German). Tübingen: Wasmuth. ISBN 978-3-8030-1022-3.
- Krautheimer, Richard (1986). Architettura paleocristiana e bizantina (in Italian). Turin: Einaudi. ISBN 88-06-59261-0.
- Westphalen, Stephan (1998). Die Odalar Camii in Istanbul. Architektur und Malerei einer mittelbyzantinischen Kirche (in German). Tübingen: Wasmuth. ISBN 3-8030-1741-6.
