= Kasım Agha Mosque =

Mosque in Istanbul, Turkey

Kasım Ağa Mosque
- Kasım Ağa Mescidi
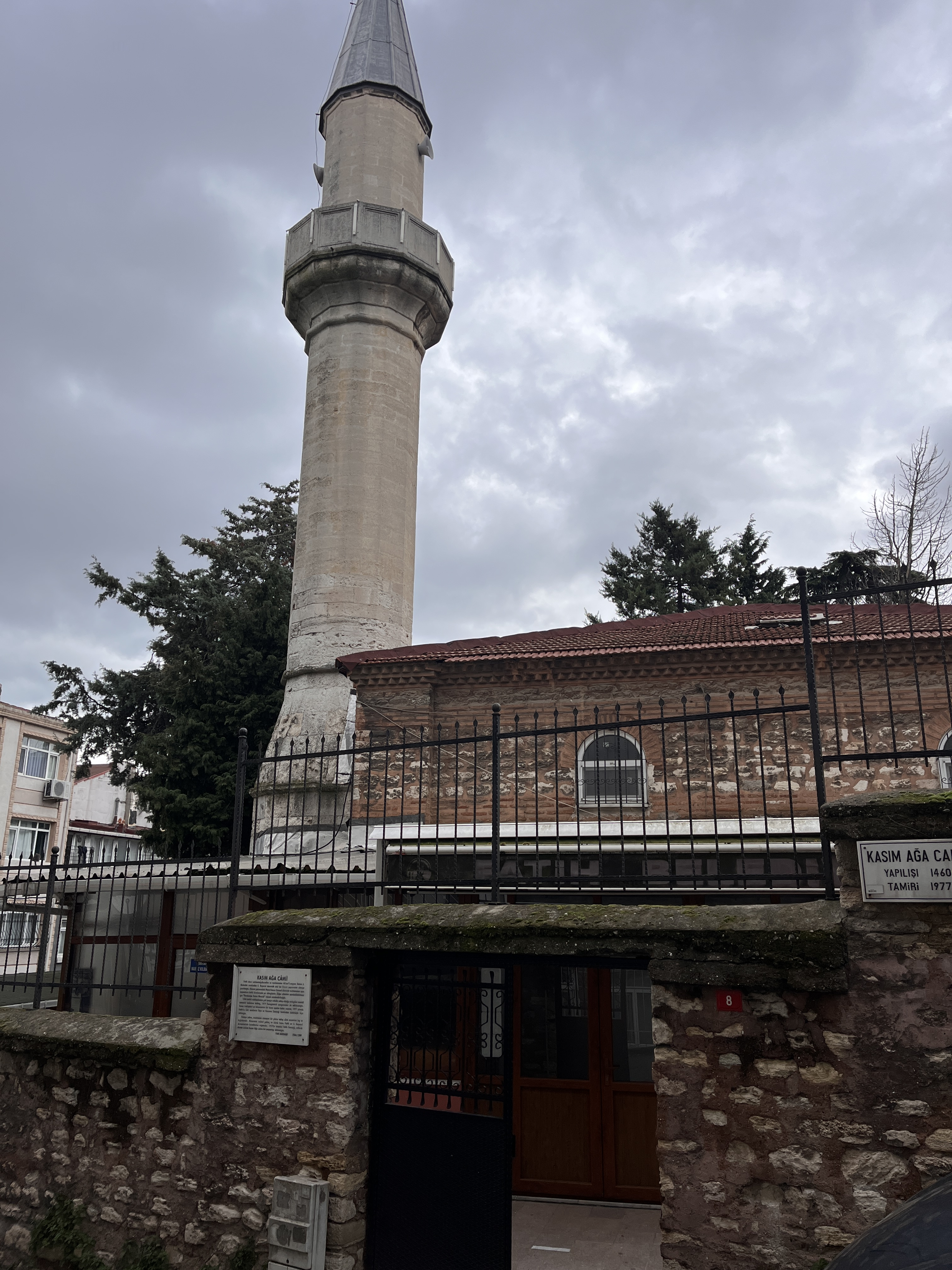

- Location in the Fatih district of Istanbul

Religion
- Affiliation: Islam

Location
- Location: Istanbul, Turkey
- Interactive map of Kasım Ağa Mosque
- Coordinates: 41.0290°N 28.9390°E

Architecture
- Type: Mosque
- Style: Byzantine

Specifications
- Minaret: 1
- Materials: brick, ashlar

Kasım Ağa Mosque (Turkish: Kasım Ağa Mescidi; also Kâsım Bey Mescidi, where mescit is the Turkish word for a small mosque) is a Byzantine building converted into a mosque by the Ottomans in Istanbul, Turkey. Neither surveying during the last restoration nor medieval sources have made it possible to find a satisfactory answer as to its origin and possible dedication. It is probable that the small building was part of the Byzantine complex and monastery whose main church was the building known in Ottoman era as the Odalar Mosque, whose dedication is also uncertain. The edifice is a minor example of Byzantine architecture in Constantinople.

== Location ==
The mosque lies in Istanbul, in the district of Fatih, in the neighborhood (Turkish: mahalle) of Salmatomruk, not far from Edirnekapı (the ancient Gate of Charisius), more or less halfway between the Chora Church and the Fethiye Mosque, and about 100 metres (330 feet) southwest of the remains of the Odalar Mosque. The small mosque – enclosed in a garden with trees – lies between Koza Sokak and Kasim Odalar Sokak, and is surrounded by modern blocks.

== History ==
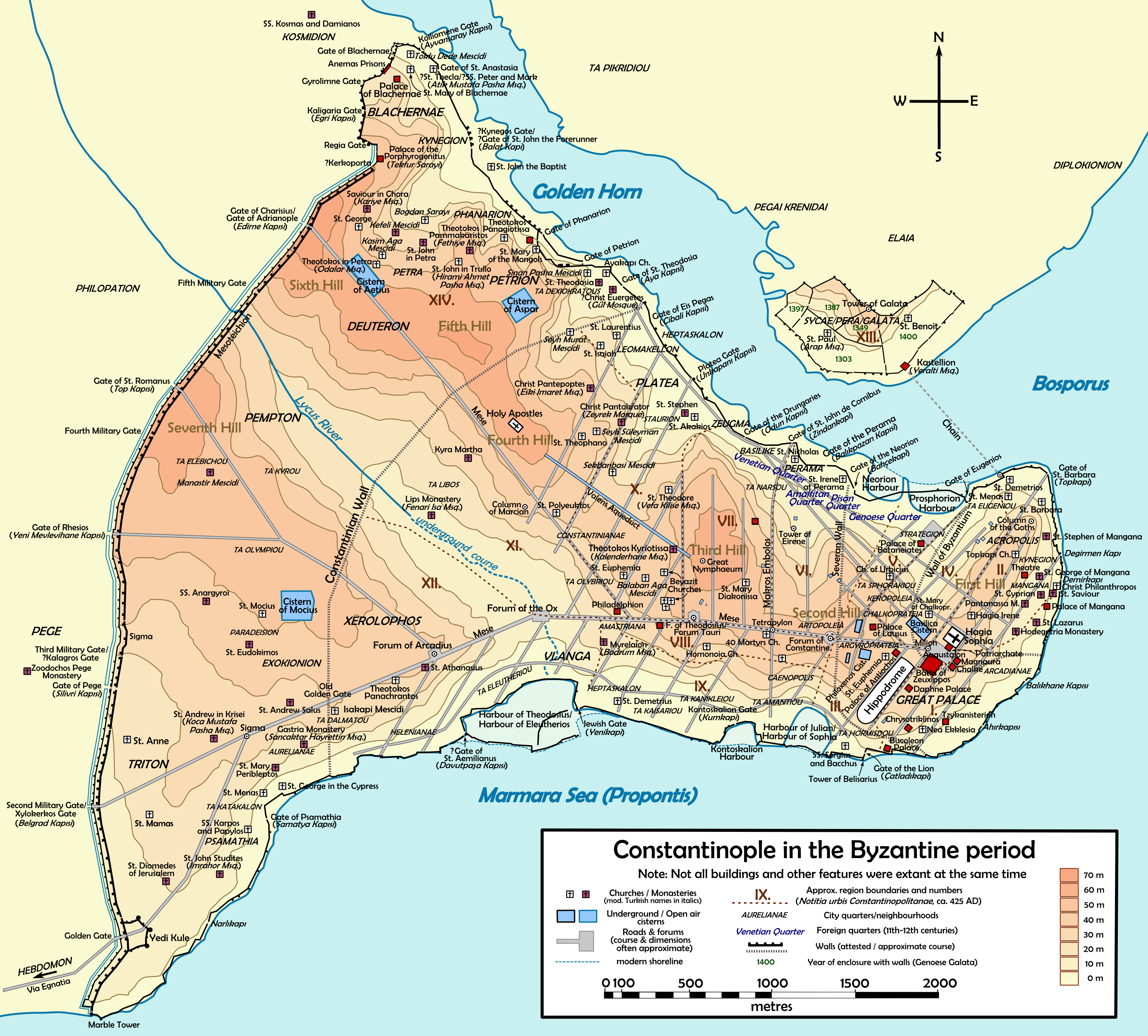
Map of Byzantine Constantinople. The Kasim Ağa Mosque is located near the eastern section of the land walls, about 300 metres (980 feet) southeast of the Gate of Charisius.

The building was erected on the top of the sixth hill of Constantinople, on a plateau which is limited by the open air Cistern of Aetius (now a football field) and by the unidentified Byzantine edifice denominated in Ottoman times as Boĝdan Saray. Nothing is known about the edifice in the Byzantine Age. Both usage and possible dedication of this building are unknown, but it is probable that it was an annex of the monastery whose katholikon is the building known in the Ottoman period as Odalar Mosque. The water supply for this complex came without doubt from the nearby Ipek cistern. Anyway, at the time of the Fall of Constantinople in 1453, the edifice was already in ruin.

After the conquest of Constantinople, a predominantly Christian population settled in the neighborhood around the building. Despite that in 1506, under the reign of Sultan Bayezid II, a pious foundation endowed by Kasım Bey bin Abdullah (possibly at that time Sekbanbaşı, that is, chief (Turkish: Agha) of the Janissaries), had a small mosque erected on the ruins of the building. To the mosque were endowed several shops and plots of land nearby, among them also the still existent Byzantine cistern named Ipek Bodrum (Turkish: Silk Basement, so named because in Ottoman times the ample room was used as silk throwing workshop). The small mosque was heavily damaged by the 1894 Istanbul earthquake and by the Salmatomruk fire on 2 July 1919, so that afterwards only the perimeter walls and the base of the minaret were still standing. Subsequently, abandoned from the middle of the 20th century, the edifice was used as a shanty (Turkish: Gecekondu), but in the 1970s it was fully restored and is now open for worship.

== Description ==
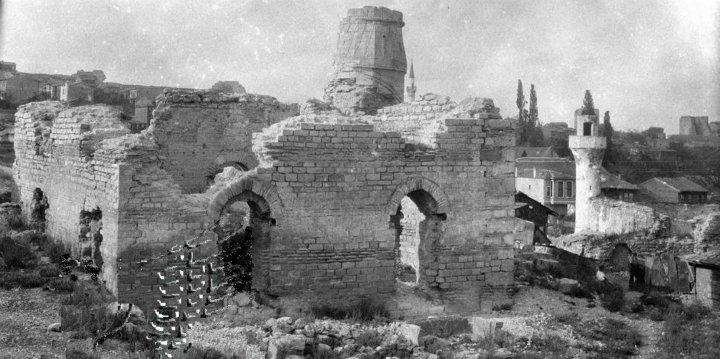
A view from south of the mosque in ruin after the fire of 1919. To its right in the background the minaret of the Odalar Mosque, also burned. The distant minaret belongs to the Kariye Mosque.

The edifice has a square plan, with a northeast–southwest orientation. The Byzantine edifice was also roughly square in plan, with a single nave preceded by an atrium at NE and a projecting room on the east side. Due to its small dimensions, the building can hardly be identified as a church, but rather as an annex belonging to a monastery. The analysis of the brickwork during the restoration showed different construction phases, and revealed that the foundations and the surviving walls were made of brick and stone. Moreover, the surveys show that during the conversion into a mosque in 1506 the atrium and the wall of the Mihrab had to be rebuilt. At the same time, a massive minaret was erected on the northeast side of the building.

== Sources ==
- Mamboury, Ernest (1953). The Tourists' Istanbul. Istanbul: Çituri Biraderler Basımevi.
- Eyice, Semavi (1955). Istanbul. Petite Guide a travers les Monuments Byzantins et Turcs (in French). Istanbul: Istanbul Matbaası.
- Müller-Wiener, Wolfgang (1977). Bildlexikon zur Topographie Istanbuls: Byzantion, Konstantinupolis, Istanbul bis zum Beginn d. 17 Jh (in German). Tübingen: Wasmuth. ISBN 9783803010223.
- Westphalen, Stephan (1998). Die Odalar Camii in Istanbul. Architektur und Malerei einer mittelbyzantinischen Kirche (in German). Tübingen: Wasmuth. ISBN 3-8030-1741-6.
