= Cistern of Aetius =

Roman cistern and sports venue in Istanbul, Turkey

Coordinates: 41°01′40″N 28°56′21″E

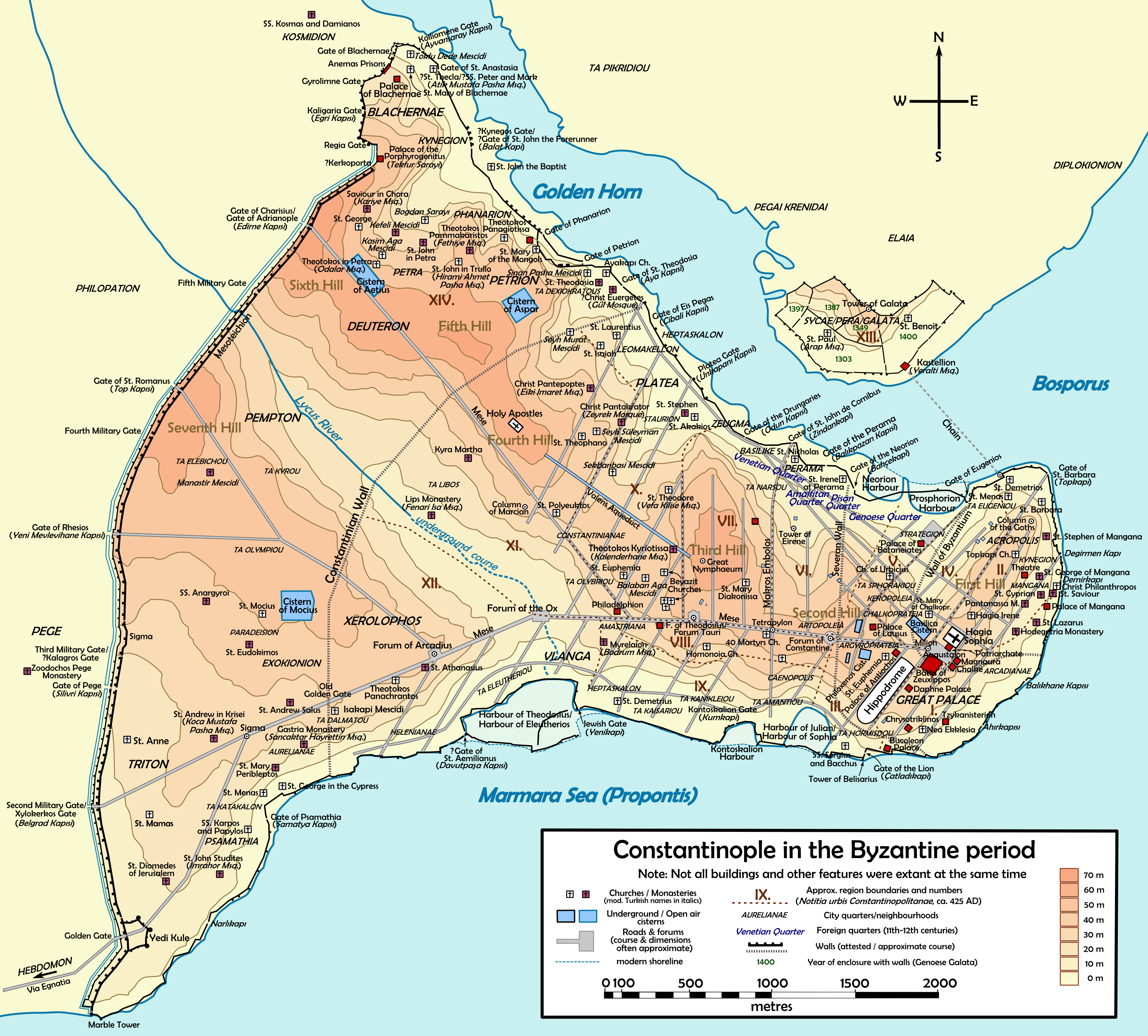
Map of Byzantine Constantinople. The Cistern of Aetius is located in the northern part of the city, southeast of the Gate of Charisius.

The Cistern of Aetius (Greek: ἡ Κινστέρνη τοῦ Ἀετίου) was an important Byzantine water reservoir in the city of Constantinople. Once one of the largest Byzantine cisterns, it is now a football stadium in Istanbul. Since 1928 it has been known as Karagümrük stadyumu, 'Karagümrük stadium' or Vefa stadyumu, 'Vefa stadium', while in the Ottoman period it was known as the Turkish: Çukurbostan, lit. 'sunken garden'.

== Location ==
The cistern is located in Istanbul, in the district of Fatih (the walled city), in the neighborhood of Karagümrük, about 300 metres (980 ft) southeast of the Gate of Edirne (the Byzantine Gate of Charisius, later known as Gate of Adrianople) of the city walls, along Fevzi Paşa Caddesi. It lies at the upper end of the valley which divides the fifth and the sixth hills of Constantinople.

== History ==
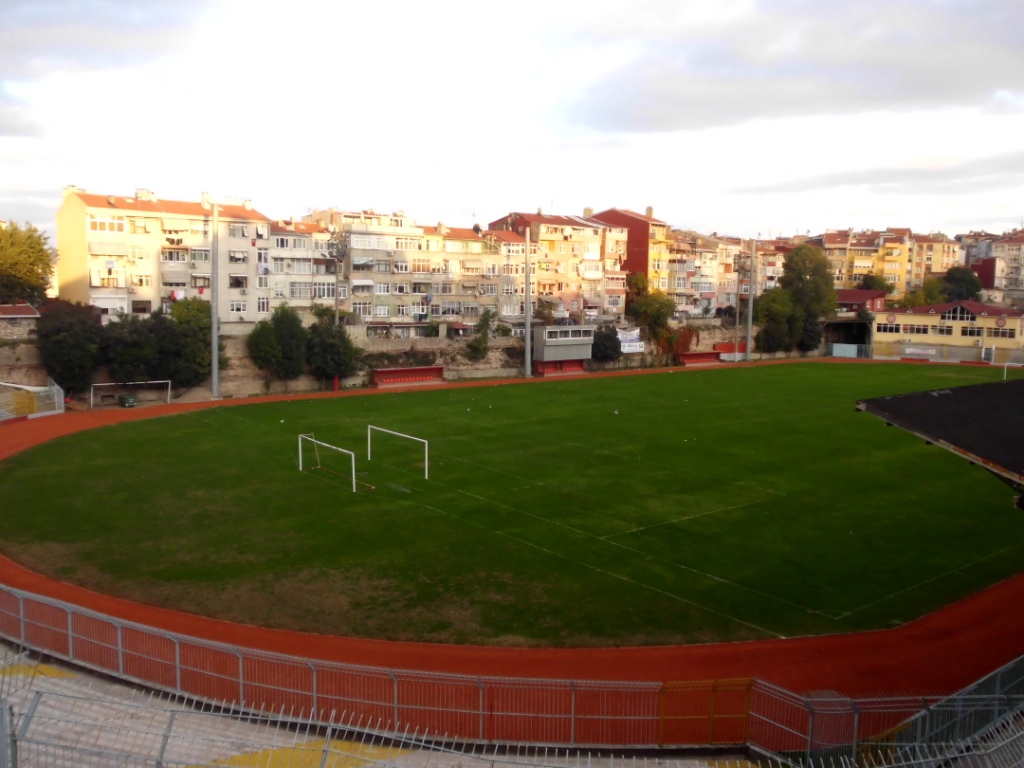
The Karagümrük Stadium seen from the west. Behind the trees it is possible to see the remains of the walls of the Cistern.

Although according to a late tradition, the erection of the cistern, which lay in the fourteenth region of Constantinople, dates back to the reign of Emperor Valens (r. 364–78), it is ascertained that it was built in 421 by Aetius, praefectus urbi in Constantinople in 419 and praefectus praetorio Orientis in 425, under Emperor Theodosius II (r. 408–50). The cistern was confused in scholarship for a long time with the cistern of Bonus or with that of Aspar: only in recent times has its identification become certain. The giant tank was oriented parallel to one branch of the Mese, the main road of the city which connected the Gate of Charisios with the center of the city passing near the Church of the Holy Apostles, and was supplied by the water main connected to the Valens Aqueduct. Due to its huge dimensions, in the Byzantine age the reservoir was often used as reference point to locate other buildings, like the monasteries of Prodomos of Petra, of the Romans (Greek: τὰ Ρωμαίου) and of Mara (Greek: τὰ Μάρα).

After the Fall of Constantinople in 1453, the 16th-century French traveller Pierre Gilles reported that around 1540 the reservoir was already empty. In the Ottoman period, as its Turkish name Çukurbostan ("hollow garden") betrays, the structure was used as vegetable garden.

Since the 1920s the structure has been turned into a sports ground, and since 1928 it hosts a football stadium, the Karagümrük (or Vefa, from the Vefa S.K. football team) stadium, which is the home stadium of Fatih Karagümrük SK team.

== Identification problem ==
Attempts to identify the location of the Cistern of Aetius started quite late. The cistern has been successively identified with a cistern located near the Palace of the Porphyrogenitus (Turkish: Tekfur Saray), and now disappeared; the cistern located in the court of the little Kefeli Mosque; the vaulted cistern located southeast of the Çukurbostan of the Gate of Adrianople and known as Zina Yokusu Bodrumi. The key to the eventual establishment of its location lay in the information that the Cistern of Aetius was located near the monastery of Prodomos of Petra, which was surely in the valley dividing the fifth and the sixth hills: this led to its identification with the Çukurbostan near the Gate of Adrianople.

== Description ==
The cistern has a rectangular plan with huge dimensions, being 244 metres (801 ft) long and 85 metres (279 ft) wide: its average depth lies between 13 metres (43 ft) and 15 metres (49 ft). Its capacity was about 0.250–0.300 million cubic metres (66–79 million US gallons) of water. Its walls, 5.20 metres (17.1 ft) thick and partially still in place, were built according to the Roman constructive technique named opus listatum by alternating four courses of bricks and ten courses of stone, an elegant pattern similar to that used by the cistern of Aspar. It has been hypothesized that this reservoir was used to supply with water the moat of the city walls, but it is more plausible that it was a central reservoir whence the water was distributed in the city.

== See also ==
- List of Roman cisterns

== Sources ==
- Mamboury, Ernest (1953). The Tourists' Istanbul. Istanbul: Çituri Biraderler Basımevi.
- Eyice, Semavi (1955). Istanbul. Petite Guide a travers les Monuments Byzantins et Turcs (in French). Istanbul: Istanbul Matbaası.
- Janin, Raymond (1964). Constantinople Byzantine (in French). Paris: Institut Français d'Etudes Byzantines.
- Müller-Wiener, Wolfgang (1977). Bildlexikon zur Topographie Istanbuls: Byzantion, Konstantinupolis, Istanbul bis zum Beginn d. 17 Jh. Tübingen: Wasmuth. ISBN 978-3-8030-1022-3.
