= Cistern of Aspar =

Coordinates: 41°1′33″N 28°56′59″E

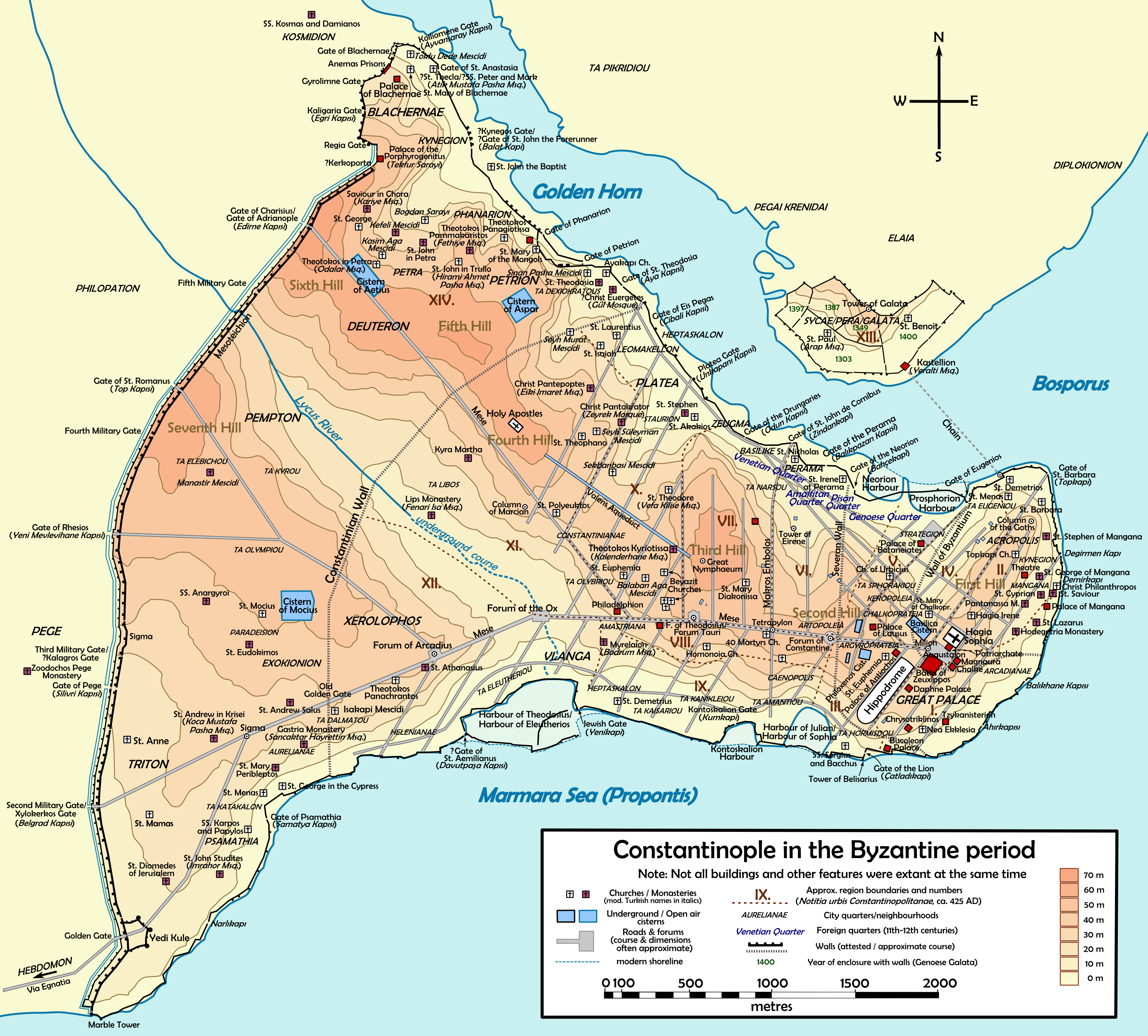
Map of Byzantine Constantinople. The Cistern of Aspar is located in the northern part of the city, on the eastern slope of the fifth hill.

The Cistern of Aspar (Greek: ἡ τοῦ Ἄσπαρος κινστέρνη) or Great Cistern (Greek: μεγίστη κινστέρνη), known in Turkish as Sultan Selim Çukurbostanı ("sunken garden of Sultan Selim"), was a Byzantine open-air water reservoir in the city of Constantinople.

== Location ==
The cistern is located in Istanbul, in the district of Fatih (the walled city), in the most elevated part of the quarter of Fener, in the neighborhood named after the building Çukurbostan, near the Yavuz Selim Mosque, between Sultan Selim Caddesi and Yavuz Selim Caddesi. It lies on the eastern slope of fifth hill of Istanbul, overlooking the Golden Horn.

== History ==
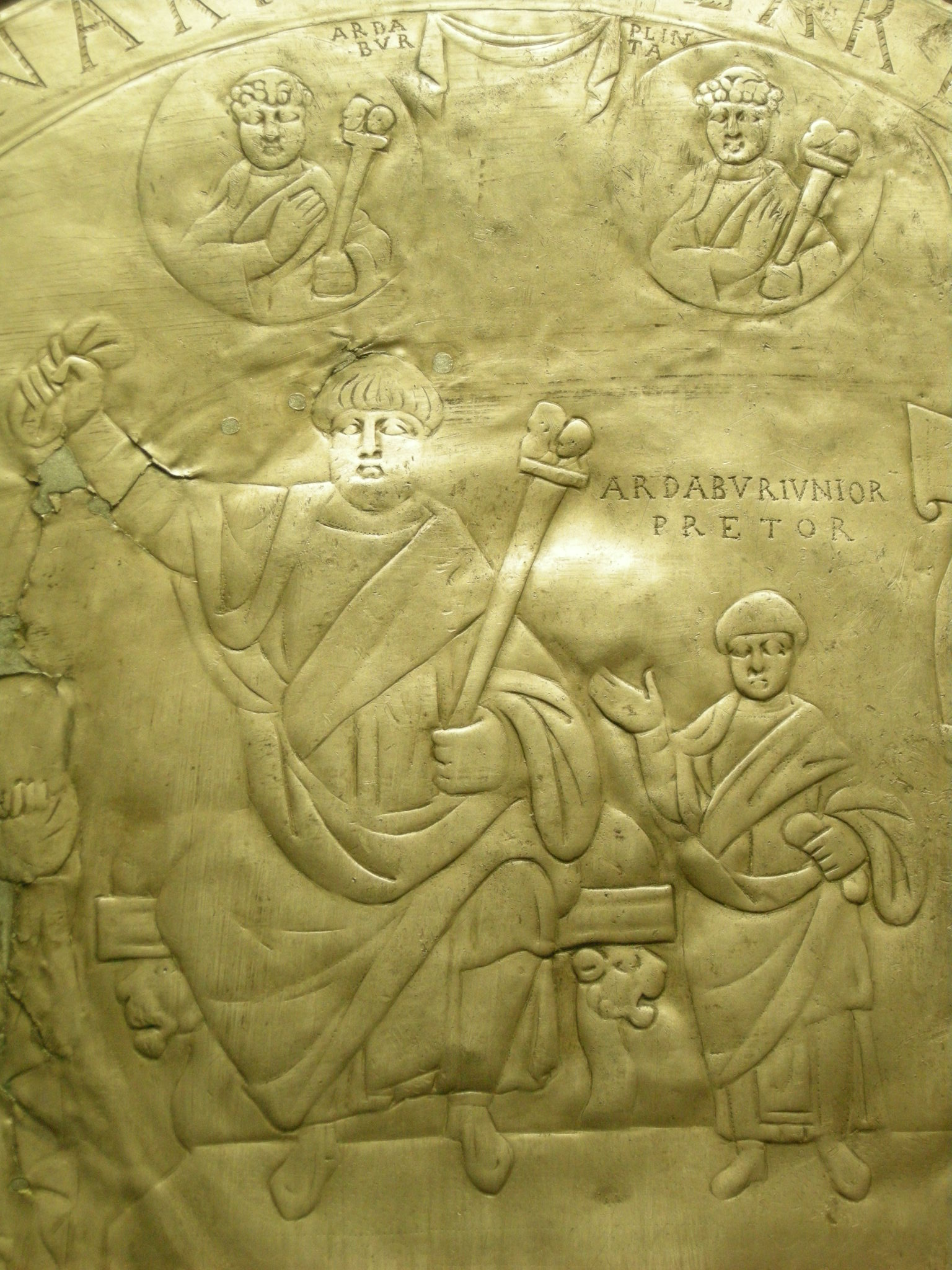
Aspar and his eldest son Ardabur, depicted in the Missorium of Aspar (c. 434)

The construction of this cistern, which lay in the fourteenth region of Constantinople, in the area called by the Byzantines Petrion, was started in 459, under Emperor Marcian (r. 450-57), by Aspar, an Alan-Gothic general serving the empire, and by his sons Ardabur and Patricius, during the consulship of Ricimer and Patricius. According to the 7th-century Chronicon Paschale, the structure lay "near the ancient wall of the city", that is near the Wall of Constantine. Older authors for a long time were unable to confirm its identity, which was ascribed to several of the city's cisterns, namely those of Bonus, of Arcadius or of the Petrion: only in recent times did its identification become certain. After the Fall of Constantinople in 1453, the French traveler Pierre Gilles observed that around 1540 the reservoir was empty, but its usage as a reservoir could have ceased already in the late Byzantine era, since then it was known under the name of Xerokepion (Ξηροκήπιον, "Dry Garden" in Greek). According to a tradition, the cistern was directly connected to the Hagia Sophia, which lies about three kilometers southeast, through a passage situated towards the mid of the southeastern side and closed around the middle of the 19th century. During the reign of Sultan Suleyman I (r. 1520-66), a small mosque was built inside the reservoir. During the Ottoman period, as its Turkish name Çukurbostan ("hollow garden") betrays, the structure was used as a vegetable garden; afterwards it hosted a small village, surrounded by orchards and gardens. As of 2004, the village, except for its mosque, had been demolished to allow the construction of a car park. The site is now used for a park and sport fields. It was used for a while as an "Education Park" (Turkish: Eğitim parkı) of Fatih, but this has ceased.

== Identification problem ==
As for other cisterns of the city, the identification of the cistern of Aspar followed only around the middle of the 20th century. It is known from the Byzantine sources that the reservoir lay near the palace of Manuel, the monasteries of Kaiouma, of the Chrysobalanton, of Manuel, of the Theotokos of "tá Koronės" (Greek: τὰ Κορὼνης), and of the monastery of Saint Theodosia. There were two crucial elements which led to the structure's identification: its erection near the wall of Constantine, and its description as "large" (Greek: μεγίστη). The reservoir has been successively identified with: a cistern located near the Bodrum Mosque; the vaulted cistern located southeast of the Çukurbostan of the Gate of Adrianople of the Theodosian walls and known as Zina Yokusu Bodrumi; the cistern near the Sivasli Dede Mescid, placed to the southeast of the Yavuz Selim Mosque; the Çukurbostan of the Gate of Charisius, (later certainly identified with the Cistern of Aetius). The first two reservoirs can be excluded since they are too far from the wall of Constantine, moreover, the second is small. The third cistern has large dimensions, but lies also too far from the ancient wall, while the fourth, although lying near the wall, is also too small. The only reservoir which satisfies both requisites, of large dimensions and of a position near the old wall, is that known in Istanbul as Yavuz Selim Çukurbostanı because of its proximity with the Yavuz Selim Mosque; this led to its identification with the Cistern of Aspar towards the middle of the 20th century.

== Description ==
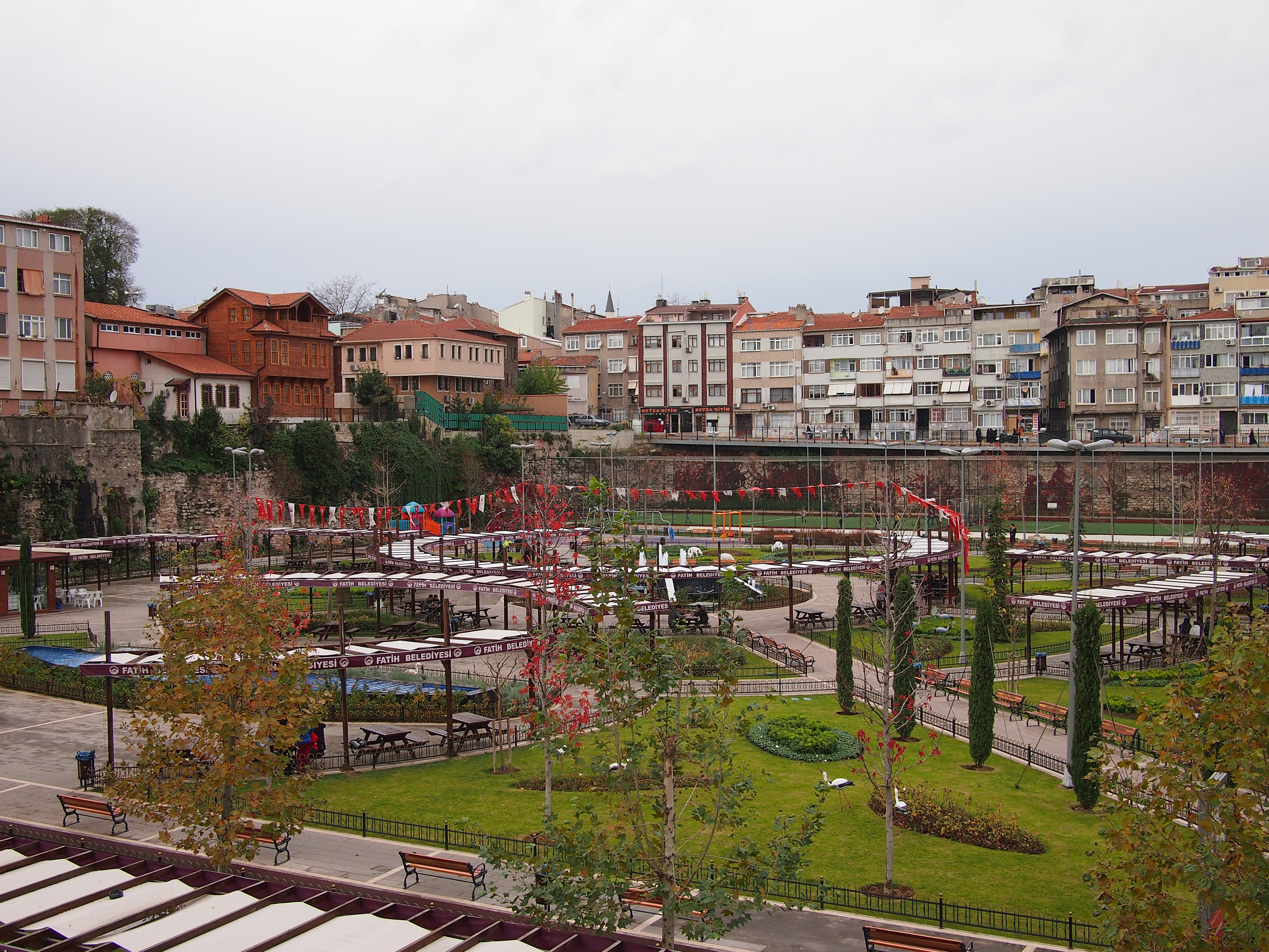
The Cistern of Aspar in 2013

The cistern has a square plan with a side 152 metres (499 ft) long covering an area of 23,100 square metres (249,000 sq ft): its average depth lies between 10 metres (33 ft) and 11 metres (36 ft). It could contain about 0.230–0.250 million cubic metres (61–66 million US gallons) of water. Its walls, 5.20 metres (17.1 ft) m thick and partially still in place, were built using the Roman construction technique named opus listatum by alternating five courses of bricks and five courses of stone, an elegant pattern similar to that also used by the cistern of Aetius. On the inner walls are visible remains of arches, a fact which has led some to assume that the cistern may have been covered. The Cistern of Pulcheria is located near the Cistern of Aspar's southeast corner.

== See also ==
- List of Roman cisterns

== Sources ==
- Mamboury, Ernest (1953). The Tourists' Istanbul. Istanbul: Çituri Biraderler Basımevi.
- Eyice, Semavi (1955). Istanbul. Petite Guide a travers les Monuments Byzantins et Turcs (in French). Istanbul: Istanbul Matbaası.
- Freely, John; Çakmak, Ahmet S. (2004). Byzantine Monuments of Istanbul. New York: Cambridge University Press. ISBN 9780521179058.
- Janin, Raymond (1964). Constantinople Byzantine (in French). Paris: Institut Français d'Etudes Byzantines.
- Müller-Wiener, Wolfgang (1977). Bildlexikon zur Topographie Istanbuls: Byzantion, Konstantinupolis, Istanbul bis zum Beginn d. 17 Jh. Tübingen: Wasmuth. ISBN 978-3-8030-1022-3.
- Altun, Feride Imrana (2009). Istanbul'un 100 Roma, Bizans Eseri (in Turkish). Istanbul: Istanbul Buyukșehir Belediyesi Kültür A.Ş. Yayınları. ISBN 978-9944-370-76-9.
