= Cistern of Pulcheria =

Cistern in Istanbul, Turkey

- Κινστέρνα Πουλχερίας (Greek)
- Position of the cistern Cistern of Pulcheria (Turkey)
- 41.025°N 28.95°E
- Location: Istanbul

History
- Built: 421 AD
- Built by: Aelia Pulcheria

Site notes
- Condition: restored, event location
- Public access: no

The Cistern of Pulcheria (Greek: Κινστέρνα Πουλχερίας, Turkish: Pulcheria Sarnıcı) is a Byzantine period covered cistern built in Constantinople (modern Istanbul, Turkey).

== Location ==
This cistern lay in the eleventh region of Constantinople, at the eastern end of the valley separating the fourth and the fifth hill of the city. The water reservoir has been tentatively identified with the covered cistern located in the north area of Fatih (the historic peninsula) near the Sivasi Tekkesi Mosque, in front of the southern end of the çukurbostan ("garden pit" in Turkish) of Sultan Selim, now identified with the cistern of Aspar. The main reason for the identification is the position of the cistern within the quarter named Pulcherianae ( Greek: αὶ Πουλχεριαναὶ, so named after the palace that the empress had build in the area).

== History ==
According to the Chronicon Paschale, a 7th-century Christian chronicle written in Greek and the only ancient source to mention it, the cistern was built by Aelia Pulcheria, who at the time was a construction advisor to her brother, the emperor Theodosius II, and was subsequently the wife of emperor Marcian. The Chronicon reports that it was filled with water for the first time during the Ides of February 421 AD. But based on its stylistic elements, Ernest Mamboury avows that the cistern was built in the 6th century. Unused after the Ottoman conquest of the city, the dry cistern was used by weavers until the beginning of the twentieth century but was then abandoned.

The cistern has been restored and it is now a wedding and event location.

== Description ==
The reservoir is one of the best kept in Istanbul. It probably belonged to a palace which has not survived. Its area covers 29.10 by 18.70 metres (95.5 by 61.4 ft). Its roof is supported by four rows of seven marble or granite columns, which bear 40 domes 8.50 metres (27.9 ft) above the ground. The columns have capitals of Corinthian order, surmounted with transoms carved with leaves of acanthus or bearing the symbol of the cross. The building has 35 windows, but now most of them are walled. Its main facade features four windows of equal area with a door placed under the third window.

== See also ==
- List of Roman cisterns
