= Çukurbostan, Fatih =

Area of Istanbul, Turkey

Coordinates: 41°1′33″N 28°56′59″E

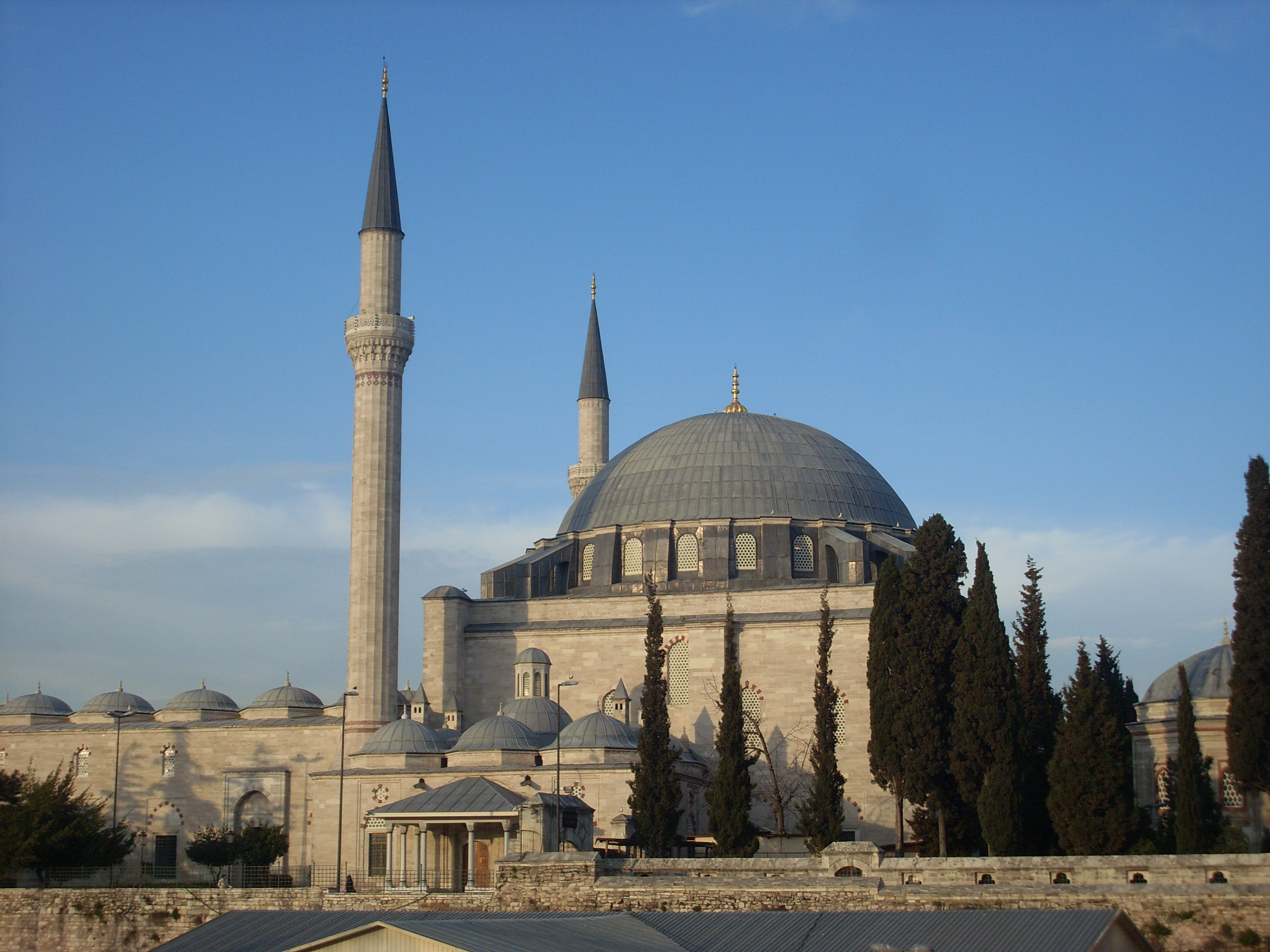
The Yavuz Selim Mosque

Çukurbostan is a quarter of the European side of Istanbul located in the north side of the Fatih district (the walled city). Although its boundaries are difficult to define exactly, Çukurbostan lies between the neighbourhoods of Balat and Atikali. The Yavuz Selim Mosque and the Byzantine Cistern of Aspar are situated in Çukurbostan. During the Ottoman period, the cistern served as a vegetable garden, and its name, Çukurbostan (sunken garden), became the name of the quarter.
