= Karagümrük =

Neighborhood in the Fatih district of Istanbul, Turkey

- Neighbourhood
- Location in Turkey Karagümrük (Istanbul)
- Coordinates: 41°01′32″N 28°56′07″E
- Country: Turkey
- Province: Istanbul
- District: Fatih
- Population (2022): 10,649
- Time zone: UTC+3 (TRT)

Karagümrük is a neighbourhood in the municipality and district of Fatih, Istanbul Province, Turkey. Its population is 10,649 (2022).

The neighborhood gives its name to a professional football club Fatih Karagümrük S.K., also called Karagümrükspor, that is based in the Karagümrük neighbourhood since 1926.

During the WWI, the area was affected by the British bombing of İstanbul.
