= Fatih Karagümrük S.K. =

Turkish football club

Fatih Karagümrük
- Full name: Fatih Karagümrük Sportif Faaliyetler Sanayi ve Ticaret A.Ş.
- Nicknames: Kara Kırmızı (Black Red); Fatih'in Torunları (Fatih's grandchildren)
- Founded: 1926; 100 years ago
- Ground: Atatürk Olympic Stadium
- Capacity: 77,563
- Coordinates: 41°04′28″N 28°45′57″E
- Owner: Süleyman Hurma
- President: Süleyman Hurma
- Head coach: Salvatore Bocchetti
- League: TFF 1. Lig
- 2025–26: Süper Lig, 18th of 18 (relegated)
- Website: www.karagumruk.com
Home colours	Away colours	Third colours

Fatih Karagümrük Spor Kulübü, also known as Mısırlı.com.tr Fatih Karagümrük for sponsorship reasons but commonly known as Karagümrük, is a Turkish professional football club based in the Karagümrük neighbourhood of the Fatih district on the historic peninsula of Istanbul. Founded in 1926, the club play in red and black and are nicknamed Kara Kırmızı (“Black-Reds”). Karagümrük currently compete in the TFF 1. Lig, the second tier of Turkish football, and stage most home matches at the Atatürk Olympic Stadium, while maintaining training facilities and their academy structure in Fatih.

One of the oldest clubs from Istanbul’s European side, Karagümrük were among the pioneers of the professional era in Turkey and won the Istanbul professional league title in 1957–58. After a lengthy spell outside the top flight, they returned to the Süper Lig in 2020–21 following promotion from the 1. Lig.

In the 2020s the team has been coached by a series of high-profile managers, including Francesco Farioli, Volkan Demirel and Andrea Pirlo, and has become known for a progressive, possession-based style. The club maintains a strong local following in the Karagümrük district and its surrounding neighbourhoods, and participates in intra-city rivalries with other Istanbul-based football clubs.

== History ==
=== Foundation and early years (1926–1949) ===
Karagümrük were founded in the spring of 1926, when local figures such as Muhtar Bey, Alaettin Bey, Nazmi Bey, Bedri Bey and Karagümrüklü Abdullah Bey brought together the youth groups Acıçeşme Gençleri and Karagümrük Gençleri to form a sports club first registered as Karagümrük İdman Yurdu. The first president was Arnavut Fevzi Efendi, and a clubhouse was opened on İskembeci Malik Street after a neighbourhood fund-raising drive.

During the same period the club adopted red and black as its colours—chosen in tribute to the local fire brigade (tulumbacılar), whose crews traditionally wore red shirts and black shorts in the Karagümrük quarter.

In the early 1930s the team began to make a name in Istanbul competitions. Contemporary fixtures show Karagümrük competing against leading city sides and taking part in civic cups such as the Halk Fırkası Kupası (Republican People’s Party Cup). In 1932 the club also hosted the Thessaloniki Representative XI in a friendly at their own ground, winning 3–2—one of the earliest occasions a non-affiliated Istanbul club brought a foreign representative side to the city.

Through the 1930s and early 1940s Karagümrük İdman Yurdu competed largely in the amateur ranks associated with the Istanbul set-up. After the 1941–42 season the club were champions in their class and applied for inclusion in the newly professional structure; however, a municipal allocation decision transferred the use of the neighbourhood ground to Vefa SK, forcing Karagümrük to suspend activities until after the war.

On 14 July 1946 the club formally re-started as Karagümrük Gençlik Kulübü, beginning again from the lower city divisions and climbing back through successive championships. Within three seasons they had advanced to the second tier of the Istanbul system and re-established themselves as a permanent presence in the city’s competitive football scene, setting the stage for the professional decades that followed.

=== Early professional era and long decline (1955–2012) ===
From the mid-1950s Karagümrük were among the Istanbul clubs pushing for the professionalisation and national coordination of league football. The club were active in the creation and early organisation of the second-tier framework that fed into the national structure which the Turkish Football Federation built across the late 1950s and 1960s.

Karagümrük’s best spell of the period came in the 1957–58 and 1958–59 campaigns in the Istanbul professional set-up, when the team topped the Istanbul Professional Second League and regularly contended with the city’s heavyweights in derby-like fixtures played in front of large crowds. The club also took part in one of the most talked-about domestic transfers of the era by signing midfielder Kadri Aytaç from Galatasaray for a reported 57,500₺, a record fee at the time and a move that helped define the market for professional players in Turkey. In those seasons the side remained unbeaten deep into the first half of the campaign before late-autumn defeats against title rivals ended their streaks.

The club cultivated a strong supporter identity in this era; Karagümrük’s songs and red-black imagery spread well beyond the neighbourhood, and the club’s football branch occasionally lent know-how and symbolic support to rising Anatolian outfits of the period as the professional game expanded inland.

By the early 1980s, however, finances began to bite. Karagümrük slipped into the Third League, then ground out consecutive promotions in 1981–82 and 1982–83 to climb back to the second and then first-tier structures of the day, only to be relegated again in 1983–84 as squad depth and budgets lagged behind rivals. On 28 April 1985 the association officially adopted the Fatih Karagümrük name used today.

Despite producing a line of notable players under the influential coach Osman “Lağim Osman” Odman including future internationals who later joined Fenerbahçe, Trabzonspor and Beşiktaş, the club could not stabilise structurally as Turkish football commercialised in the 1990s. Economic strain led to multiple relegations: by 1996–97 Karagümrük had fallen to the Amateur League, then narrowly missed out on immediate promotion in 1999–2000, before returning to the Third League in the early 2000s. A brief sponsorship arrangement with Japanese electronics firm Kyoto n the early 2000s offered respite but lasted only one season; after a short revival the club again slid to the Amateur level in 2004–05, and remained outside the professional ladder for several years.

The reset finally arrived in 2011–12 when Karagümrük captured the Regional Amateur League title and earned promotion back to the Third League, laying the foundations for the corporate restructuring and successive climbs that would follow later in the decade.

=== Rebuild era (2012–present) ===
After returning to the professional pyramid in 2012–13, Fatih Karagümrük modernised its legal and sporting structure. On 20 June 2012 the club registered a new corporate entity and emblem with the Turkish Football Federation (TFF); the football branch of the association was transferred to “Fatih Karagümrük Sportif Faaliyetler Sanayi ve Ticaret A.Ş.” to cover professional operations.

In 2013–14 the team finished fourth in their Third League group and advanced through the play-offs. Karagümrük defeated Bergama Belediyespor in the semi-finals and overcame 1920 Maraşspor in the final to claim the play-off championship and promotion to the Second League.

During the mid-2010s, businessman Cengiz Günaydın assumed ownership and financed work on facilities and stadium matters; however, continuing financial strain led him to signal that the club was for sale. On 26 June 2018 former sporting director Süleyman Hurma purchased a controlling stake (reported as 71%) and was elected club president, initiating a more professional governance model.

The 2018–19 season began with Yusuf Şimşek as head coach, but he resigned after six league matches. Cüneyt Dumlupınar took charge and the team finished second in their group to reach the play-offs. Karagümrük then eliminated Şanlıurfaspor in the quarter-finals and Manisa FK in the semi-finals, before defeating Sakaryaspor in the final to secure promotion to the First League.

The 2019–20 campaign opened with rapid coaching changes: after Cüneyt Dumlupınar’s brief spell, captain Erkan Zengin acted as interim before veteran Giray Bulak was appointed in late November; results remained poor and Bulak departed in December. In January 2020, chairman Süleyman Hurma turned to club great Şenol Can. Karagümrük surged to the promotion play-offs in the First League and defeated Akhisar Belediyespor in the semi-finals and Adana Demirspor on penalties in the final to return to the top flight after 36 years.

Back in the Süper Lig in 2020–21, Karagümrük finished eighth with 60 points, an impressive return for a newly promoted side under Şenol Can. The following season saw a mid-year transition: young Italian coach Francesco Farioli arrived during 2021–22, steering the team to mid-table safety and a possession-heavy style that drew notice in Turkey.

In June 2022 the club hired Andrea Pirlo, who guided Karagümrük to a top-half finish (7th) in 2022–23, the best league placing of the modern era for the side. After Pirlo’s departure that summer, the club began 2023–24 with Alparslan Erdem and then appointed Shota Arveladze in October; results remained volatile and Karagümrük were relegated on the final day despite a 3–1 win at Beşiktaş.

On 10 March 2024, the club announced Tolunay Kafkas as head coach following Arveladze’s resignation. Relegated to the First League for 2024–25, Karagümrük regrouped and won the promotion play-off final on 29 May 2025, defeating Bandırmaspor 3–1 after extra time to secure an immediate return to the Süper Lig for 2025–26.

Through this period the club continued to stage most home fixtures at the Atatürk Olympic Stadium, with occasional moves prompted by stadium availability and licensing requirements, as historic Vefa Stadium did not consistently meet top-tier criteria.

== Stadium ==
=== Vefa Stadium ===
Karagümrük’s traditional home ground is Vefa Stadium (often called Karagümrük Stadı), located in the Karagümrük quarter of Fatih, within the historic peninsula of Istanbul. The compact municipal venue has been used by the club for most of its history and has also hosted other Istanbul teams at various times. Its current listed capacity is around 4,500, with standard top-division pitch dimensions of 105×68 m.

The ground has undergone periodic upgrades led by the municipality to keep it suitable for professional football (floodlighting, seating, and safety improvements). Recent works have focused on renewing spectator areas and the playing surface to align with federation criteria for national competitions.

=== Use of alternative venues in the Süper Lig ===
Following promotion to the Süper Lig in 2020, Karagümrük moved first-team home fixtures to the Atatürk Olympic Stadium to comply with broadcast, capacity and safety requirements that exceeded the limits of Vefa Stadium at the time. The club announced the Olympic Stadium as its home for the 2020–21 campaign, occasionally using other compliant venues as scheduling and maintenance required.

In subsequent seasons the club continued to stage top-flight matches at compliant large venues while coordinating with local authorities on phased improvements at Vefa Stadium, with the long-term aim of returning more fixtures to their historic ground when federation standards and scheduling permit.

== Colours and crest ==
Karagümrük’s traditional colours are red and black. According to club and contemporary press accounts, the palette was chosen in the 1920s in homage to the neighbourhood’s historical fire-brigade (tulumbacılar) whose crews wore red shirts and black shorts in the Karagümrük quarter. The team are commonly referred to by the colour-based nickname Kara Kırmızı (Black-Red).

Karagümrük’s home strip traditionally features vertically striped black-and-red shirts with black shorts and socks; alternate kits have varied between white, red or black change colours depending on competition requirements.

The club crest has evolved from early word-mark shields used by Karagümrük İdman Yurdu in local newspapers to the modern circular badge. Early examples in the Istanbul press show red-black emblems bearing the club name around the 1930s and 1940s.

Today’s crest is a roundel carrying the inscription Fatih Karagümrük Spor Kulübü 1926, with a red inner field and stylised white laurel branches—an identity that was refined in the 2010s as the club modernised its visual standards while retaining the historic colour scheme.

== Supporters ==
Fatih Karagümrük draw a neighbourhood-based following from the Karagümrük quarter of Fatih on Istanbul’s historic peninsula. Media coverage routinely describes the club as a “semt takımı” with strong local identity around Vefa Stadium and its surrounding streets, where matchday displays feature red-and-black colours, drums and banners.

Promotion moments have been marked by large public gatherings in the district. During the 2020 play-off final, supporters watched on a giant screen inside Vefa Stadium and held celebrations after the decisive penalty shoot-out; similar scenes were recorded again in 2025 when the club secured another promotion via the play-off final, with thousands celebrating at Karagümrük Stadı and in nearby squares.

Organised groups operate through local associations and cultural centres, reflecting the club’s community orientation. The Fatih Karagümrük Supporters’ Association has hosted public meetings with municipal and club leaders on stadium and facilities matters, underscoring fans’ role in decision-making around the matchday experience.

Following promotion to the Süper Lig in 2020, home fixtures were staged at the Atatürk Olympic Stadium and, at times, other compliant venues, which altered travel and ticketing routines for supporters compared with Vefa Stadium. Club and press statements during this period highlighted the move’s impact on fans and the continued push for a modernised local ground.

Supporter culture around the club has been documented in photo features and local reporting, including balcony-view traditions overlooking Vefa’s stands and street-level choreographies in the district, reinforcing the team’s image as a community-rooted side.

== Rivalries ==
Karagümrük contest several neighbourhood and city derbies rooted in proximity around the Golden Horn and the historic peninsula. Meetings with Kasımpaşa are commonly styled the “Haliç derbisi” (Golden Horn derby) in Turkish sports media, reflecting the clubs’ locations on opposite banks of the inlet and a long competitive history across divisions and the cup. Recent top-flight and cup ties have sustained the rivalry’s profile, including Karagümrük’s 3–2 league win in April 2022 and earlier cup meetings at Vefa Stadium.

Karagümrük’s matches with Eyüpspor form an inner-city derby between Fatih and Eyüpsultan districts. The clubs met frequently in the second and third tiers during the 2010s and resumed top-flight meetings after Eyüpspor’s promotion; fixtures have occasionally been security-sensitive.

Derbies with İstanbulspor are regularly framed as “İstanbul derbisi” by national broadcasters, reflecting the clubs’ shared city footprint and frequent league meetings in recent seasons.

Historic neighbourhood rivalries date back to the Istanbul leagues, with numerous fixtures against Beykoz and Vefa recorded from the late 1950s onward and continuing in later professional tiers. Archival match records and federation data document repeated pairings, including league meetings in 1959 and 1962 versus Beykoz and professional-era encounters into the 2000s, as well as long-standing ground-sharing dynamics around Vefa Stadı.

== Statistics ==
=== Results of League and Cup Competitions by Season ===
Season	League table									Turkish Cup	Top scorer	
Season	League	Pos	P	W	D	L	GF	GA	Pts	Turkish Cup	Player	Goals
1959	Süper Lig	5th	14	4	4	6	17	17	16	–	Aydın Yelken	5
1959–60	Süper Lig	8th	38	15	10	13	50	45	55	–	Kadri Aytaç	13
1960–61	Süper Lig	9th	38	12	11	15	48	48	47	–	Tuncay Becedek	10
1961–62	Süper Lig	15th	38	10	12	16	38	45	42	–	Tarık Kutver	11
1962–63	Süper Lig	10th	20	4	4	12	20	32	20	QF	Ali Soydan	6
1963–64	1. Lig	9th	24	7	7	10	30	29	28	R3	Sudi Dizer	4
1964–65	1. Lig	13th	30	9	6	15	37	52	33	R2	Yılmaz	5
1965–66	1. Lig	7th	20	5	8	7	19	24	23	R2	Doğan Boruk	4
1966–67	1. Lig	8th	32	11	10	11	36	37	43	R2	Yılmaz Öztürk	8
1967–68	1. Lig	16th	38	10	13	15	27	39	43	–	İbrahim Ekmekçi	8
1968–69	1. Lig	18th	34	3	11	20	16	62	20	–	İbrahim Ekmekçi	3
1969–70	3. Lig	12th	40	13	11	16	37	45	50	–	N/A	N/A
1970–71	3. Lig	8th	28	11	7	10	33	31	40	–	N/A	N/A
1971–72	3. Lig	9th	28	9	9	10	31	30	36	–	N/A	N/A
1972–73	3. Lig	9th	24	5	12	7	16	25	27	–	N/A	N/A
1973–74	3. Lig	17th	42	12	14	16	32	38	50	–	N/A	N/A
1974–75	3. Lig	11th	34	14	3	17	21	29	45	–	N/A	N/A
1975–76	3. Lig	11th	30	7	9	14	21	39	30	R1	N/A	N/A
1976–77	3. Lig	7th	20	6	9	5	22	20	27	R1	N/A	N/A
1977–78	3. Lig	7th	24	9	5	10	27	21	32	R2	N/A	N/A
1978–79	3. Lig	4th	22	9	5	8	27	21	32		N/A	N/A
1979–80	3. Lig	2nd	36	15	13	8	44	26	58	R3	N/A	N/A
1980–81	1. Lig	14th	34	9	11	14	22	36	38	R2	N/A	N/A
1981–82	1. Lig	7th	28	9	11	8	20	19	38	R4	N/A	N/A
1982–83	1. Lig	1st	30	18	10	2	43	16	64	R3	N/A	N/A
1983–84	Süper Lig	18th	34	8	10	16	34	49	34	L16	Ömer Kaner	9
1984–85	1. Lig	6th	32	12	11	9	34	31	47	R2	Nihat Nalbantic	7
1985–86	1. Lig	6th	34	12	10	12	34	29	46	R1	Abdullah Avcı	17
1986–87	1. Lig	9th	34	9	14	11	30	38	41	–	Talip Yeter	6
1987–88	1. Lig	16th	32	9	8	15	29	40	35	–	N/	N/A
1988–89	3. Lig	1st	30	20	4	6	59	23	64	–	N/	N/A
1989–90	1. Lig	9th	32	12	7	13	35	35	43	–	Selçuk Bıyıklı	8
1990–91	1. Lig	6th	34	12	9	13	42	38	45	R2	Sadun Narlıtepe	11
1991–92	1. Lig	17th	34	7	10	17	30	61	31	R1	Sadun Narlıtepe	6
1992–93	3. Lig	2nd	30	15	6	9	48	29	51	R2	Meriç Güven	8
1993–94	3. Lig	3rd	24	11	7	6	33	19	40	R1	N/A	N/A
1994–95	3. Lig	10th	26	9	4	13	23	33	31	–	Nadim Akgün	4
1995–96	3. Lig	11th	26	7	9	10	25	29	30	–	Bariş Apa	4
1996–97	3. Lig	17th	32	3	7	22	24	59	16	–	N/A	N/A
1997–98	During these seasons, the club competed in the Istanbul Amateur Leagues.											
1998–99	During these seasons, the club competed in the Istanbul Amateur Leagues.											
1999–00	During these seasons, the club competed in the Istanbul Amateur Leagues.											
2000–01	3. Lig	5th	32	16	4	12	50	38	52	–	N/A	N/A
2001–02	3. Lig	1st	36	21	9	6	49	27	72	–	N/A	N/A
2002–03	2. Lig	12th	34	10	9	15	34	49	39	–	N/A	N/A
2003–04	2. Lig	1st	32	18	9	5	60	37	63	–	N/A	N/A
2004–05	1. Lig	18th	34	6	5	23	31	77	23	R2	N/A	N/A
2005–06	2. Lig	7th	36	12	11	13	40	36	47	GS	Haydar Özdemir	9
2006–07	2. Lig	7th	32	10	10	12	42	49	40	–	Erbil Aktepe	7
2007–08	2. Lig	10th	32	4	4	24	18	59	16	–	Harun Özkan	4
2008–09	3. Lig	10th	32	9	7	16	35	41	34	–	Doğuş Güneş	11
2009–10	That season, the club competed in the Istanbul Super Amateur League and emerged as champions.											
2010–11	BAL	5th	22	10	6	6	40	34	36	–	Yasin Markal	19
2011–12	BAL	1st	20	13	4	3	37	14	43	–	Oğuzhan Türkmen	11
2012–13	3. Lig	2nd	34	19	6	9	59	35	63	R1	Caner Altın	12
2013–14	3. Lig	4th	34	15	12	7	45	24	57	R2	Recep Akkemik	10
2014–15	2. Lig	6th	36	14	15	7	41	34	57	GS	Serdar Dursun	13
2015–16	2. Lig	14th	34	11	8	15	32	49	41	R3	Serdar Dursun	7
2016–17	2. Lig	12th	34	11	9	14	39	42	42	R3	Mert Somay	9
2017–18	2. Lig	15th	34	10	6	18	32	48	36	R4	Ufuk Akyol	9
2018–19	2. Lig	2nd	34	21	5	8	55	34	68	R5	Erkan Zengin	19
2019–20	1. Lig	5th	37	12	12	8	58	43	56	R5	Innocent Emeghara	7
2020–21	Süper Lig	8th	40	16	12	12	64	52	60	R4	Alassane Ndao	11
2021–22	Süper Lig	8th	38	16	9	13	47	52	57	QF	Aleksandar Pesic	14
2022–23	Süper Lig	7th	36	13	12	11	75	63	51	L16	Mbaye Diagne	23
2023–24	Süper Lig	18th	38	10	10	18	49	52	40	SF	–	–
2024–25	1. Lig	3rd	38	19	9	10	55	36	66		Wesley Moraes	18
2025–26	Süper Lig	TBD										

=== League participations ===
- Süper Lig: 1958–63, 1983–84, 2020–2024, 2025–
- 1. Lig: 1963–69, 1980–83, 1984–88, 1989–92, 2004–05, 2019–20, 2024–2025
- 2. Lig 1969–80, 1988–89, 1992–97, 2000–01, 2002–04, 2005–08, 2014–19
- 3. Lig: 2001–02, 2008–09, 2012–14
- Amateur League: 2010–12
- Super Amateur League: 1997–2000, 2009–10

== Non-player staff ==
=== Coaching staff ===
Position	Staff
Head coach	(Serbia) Aleksandar Stanojević
Assistant Coach	(Bulgaria) Aleksandar Gitsov
Assistant Coach	(Serbia) Miloš Podunavac
Fitness Coach	(Greece) Pantelis Pantelopoulos

=== Club Staff ===
Position	Staff
Owner & President	(Turkey) Süleyman Hurma
Vice President	(Turkey) Serkan Hurma
Sporting Director	(Turkey) Umut Köse

== Players ==
As of 23 September 2026

Note: Flags indicate national team as defined under FIFA eligibility rules; some limited exceptions apply. Players may hold more than one non-FIFA nationality.

No.	Pos.	Nation	Player
1	GK	ITA	Marco Silvestri
3	DF	TUR	Atınç Nukan
4	DF	ITA	Davide Biraschi
5	MF	TUR	Emre Akbaba
6	DF	GER	Robin Yalçın
7	MF	TUR	Barış Kalaycı
8	MF	TUR	Dorukhan Toköz
9	FW	TUR	Cenk Tosun
10	FW	ITA	Daniele Verde
11	FW	TUR	Tiago Çukur
14	MF	CIV	Marius Trésor Doh
17	FW	TUR	Tarık Buğra Kalpaklı
19	MF	CIV	Yaya Onogo

No.	Pos.	Nation	Player
20	MF	GRE	Manolis Siopis
21	MF	TUR	Candan Başkale
22	DF	TUR	Ramazan Civelek
23	GK	TUR	Batuhan Şen
24	DF	TUR	Burhan Ersoy
25	DF	TUR	Muhammed Sarıkaya
26	FW	CIV	Ahmed Traore
27	DF	TUR	Muhammed Kadıoğlu
28	DF	TUR	Anıl Yiğit Çınar
33	DF	TUR	Çağtay Kurukalıp
41	MF	WAL	Josh Esen
72	FW	SRB	Aleksandar Pešić
98	GK	TUR	Berke Can Evli

=== Out on loan ===
Note: Flags indicate national team as defined under FIFA eligibility rules; some limited exceptions apply. Players may hold more than one non-FIFA nationality.

No.	Pos.	Nation	Player
—	GK	TUR	Kerem Yandal (at Erciyes 38 until 30 June 2027)
—	DF	TUR	Hakan Eren Atabey (at Erciyes 38 until 30 June 2027)

No.	Pos.	Nation	Player
—	FW	TUR	Mustafa Özköroğlu (at Beyoğlu Yeni Çarşı until 30 June 2027)

== Ownership and finances ==
Fatih Karagümrük’s professional football activities are operated by the joint-stock company Fatih Karagümrük Sportif Faaliyetler Sanayi ve Ticaret A.Ş. (the “A.Ş.” suffix indicating a Turkish JSC).

In June 2018 businessman Süleyman Hurma acquired a controlling stake in the club and was elected president, completing a share transfer reported at 71% of the equity and promising new investment in infrastructure and the first team. Prior to the sale, the club had been controlled by Cengiz Günaydın, who publicly stated that the shares were being offered due to continuing stadium and operating constraints.

Since the change of control, Karagümrük’s budget has relied on central broadcasting revenue, Süper Lig distribution, commercial sponsorship and matchday income, with the board emphasising a sustainable player-trading model (experienced free agents and short contracts) to keep cash burn in check. The club has periodically disclosed that it meets the TFF Kulüp Lisans (club licensing) criteria for financial and administrative compliance.

Karagümrük have also pursued naming-rights and front-of-shirt deals as key revenue lines. In 2021–22 the team competed as “VavaCars Fatih Karagümrük” under a multi-season commercial agreement announced jointly by the parties. Kit-supplier and sleeve partnerships (announced annually) have been another recurring source of commercial income.

Matchday operations have alternated between Vefa Stadium and when required by safety and capacity regulations, larger municipal venues (e.g., Atatürk Olympic Stadium), a practice the board has linked to both licensing obligations and revenue optimisation.

As of 2025, the majority shareholder remains Süleyman Hurma, who chairs the board and oversees football operations alongside the club’s chief executive and sporting department.

== See also ==
- Fatih Karagümrük S.K. (women's football)
