= Kefeli Mosque =

Mosque in Istanbul, Turkey

Kefeli Mosque Kefeli Câmîi
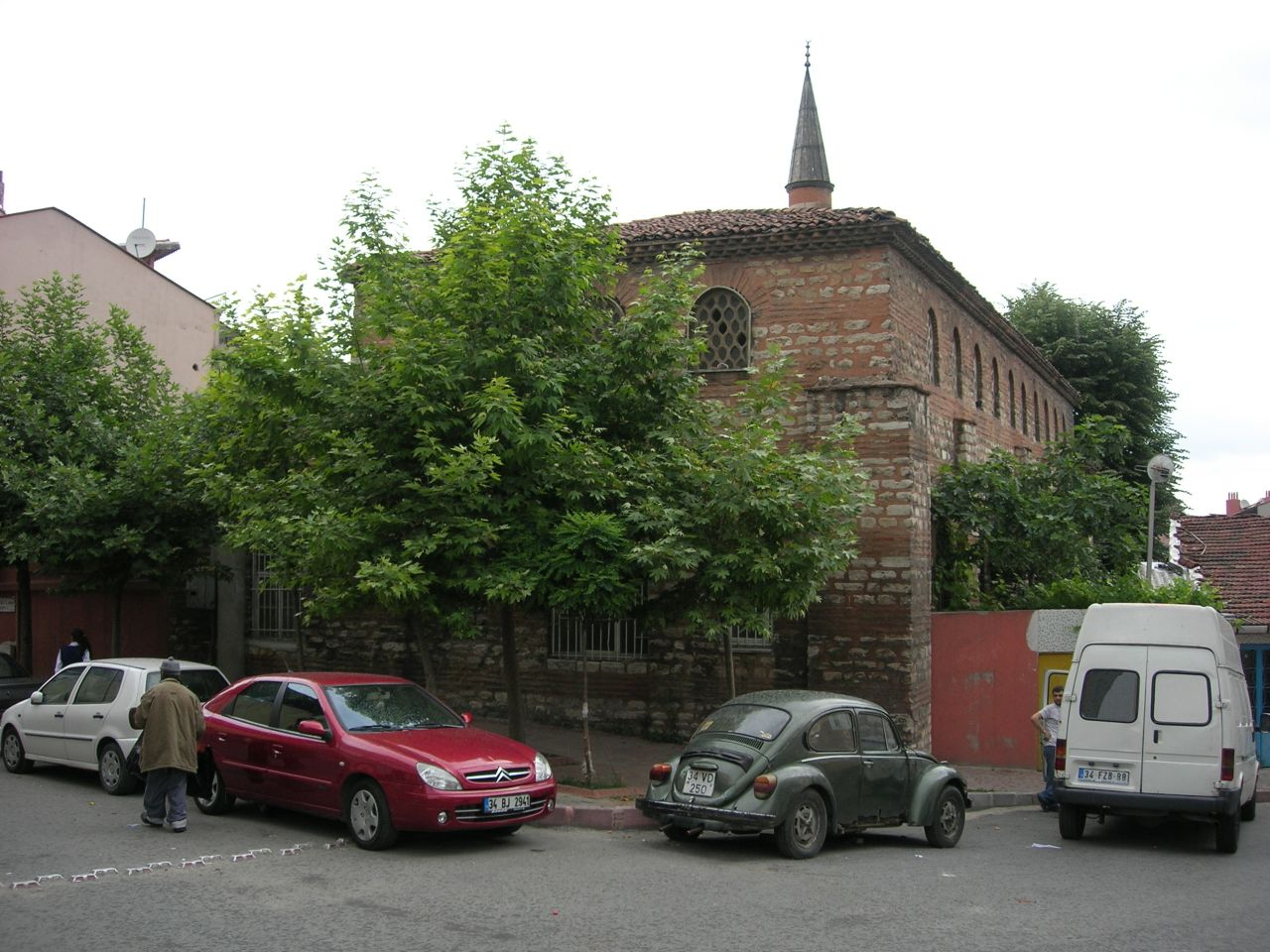
- The Kefeli Mosque seen from the south

- Location in the Fatih district of Istanbul

Religion
- Affiliation: Sunni Islam
- Year consecrated: Between 1623 and 1640

Location
- Location: Istanbul, Turkey
- Coordinates: 41°1′46″N 28°56′30″E

Architecture
- Type: church
- Style: Byzantine
- Completed: Between 13th and 15th century

Specifications
- Minaret: 1
- Materials: brick, stone

The Kefeli Mosque (Turkish: Kefeli Câmîi, meaning "the mosque of the Caffariotes", after the inhabitants of the city of Caffa in Crimea, or also Kefeli Mescidi, where Mescit is the Turkish word for a small mosque) is a former Eastern Orthodox church, later jointly officiated by Roman Catholics and Armenians, and finally converted into a mosque by the Ottomans. The Catholic Church was dedicated to Saint Nicholas. Its date of dedication as an Eastern Orthodox church is unknown, but it is commonly identified with the 9th-century Monastery of Manuel (Greek: Μονὴ τοῦ Μανουήλ).

The interest of Kefeli Mosque arises because it repurposes the early Christian basilica form during the later Byzantine period.

== Location ==
The building lies in Istanbul, in the district of Fatih, in the neighborhood of Salmatomruk, on Kasap Sokak, more or less halfway between the mosque of Chora and the mosque of Fethiye.

== History ==
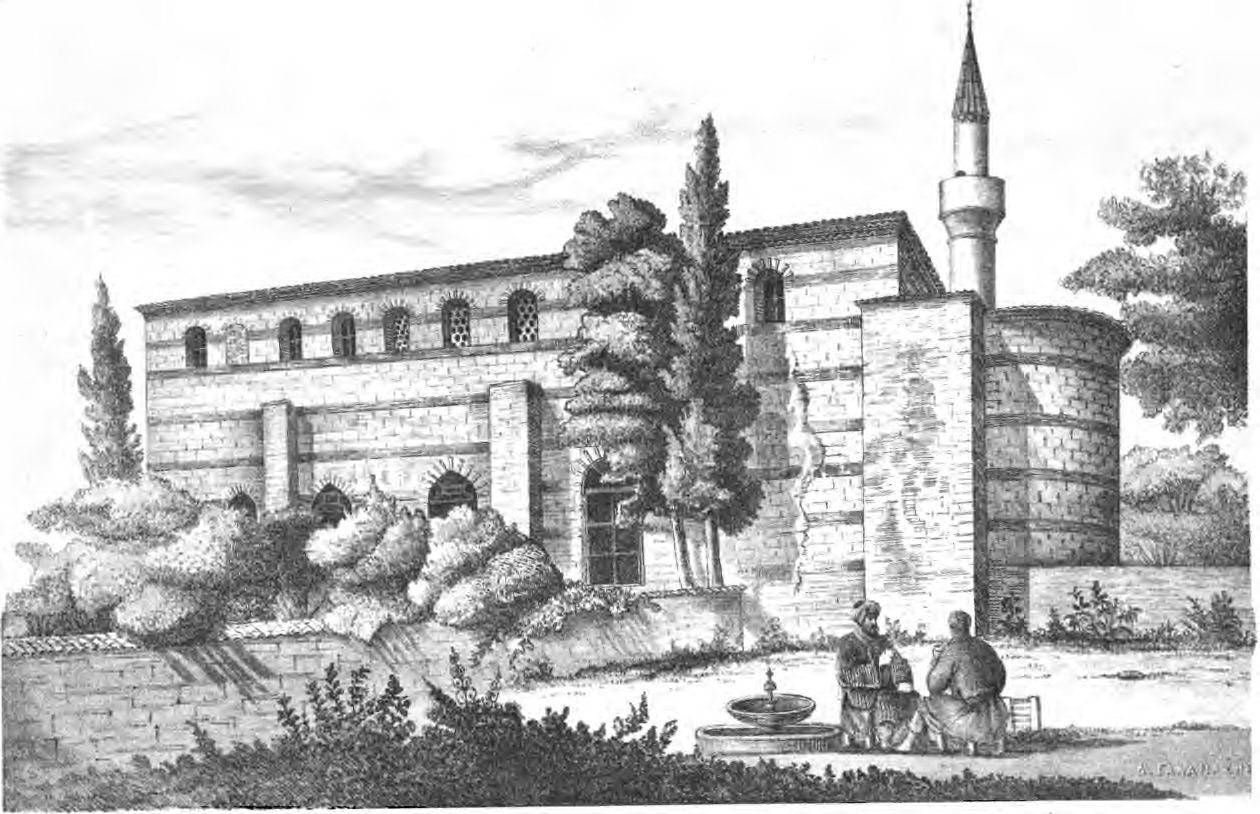
The mosque in a drawing of 1877.

The origin of this building, which lies on the slope of the sixth hill of Constantinople, is not certain. The tradition says that in the ninth century Manuel the Armenian, a general in the wars against the Saracens during the reign of Emperor Theophilos (r. 829–842), built a monastery converting his house, which lay near the cistern of Aspar. Manuel was the uncle of Empress Theodora, wife of Theophilos, and before retiring to his monastery he was one of the three counselors who assisted her in the regency for her infant son Michael III, following the death of her husband.

The Monastery of Manuel was rebuilt by Patriarch Photius, and was restored again by usurper Romanos I Lekapenos (r. 920–944). Emperor Michael VII (r. 1071–1078) retired here after his deposition. All these events show the importance of this monastery in Constantinople. Nevertheless, the attribution of this building to the complex founded by Manuel is far from certain, and has been denied by the newest research.

The documented history of the current edifice begins in 1475, shortly after the Fall of Constantinople, when the Ottomans conquered the Genoese colony of Caffa, in Crimea. All the Latin, Greek and Jewish inhabitants who lived in Caffa ("Caffariotes" or, in Turkish, Kefeli) were then deported to Istanbul and relocated to this quarter. The Latins, mainly Genoese, were authorized to use this building as a church together with the Armenians. The church, dedicated to Saint Nicholas, was officiated by the Dominicans, and kept by four Catholic families. Armenians and Catholics had separated altars. This small church depended on the near Catholic Church of Saint Mary, which later became the Odalar Mosque. In 1630, under the reign of Murad IV (1623–1640), the church was converted into a mescit (a small mosque) by Great Vizier Receb Pasha, but retained the denomination, being first known as Kefe Mahalle, then as Kefeli Mescidi. In exchange, the Armenians got a Greek church in Balat.

== Architecture ==
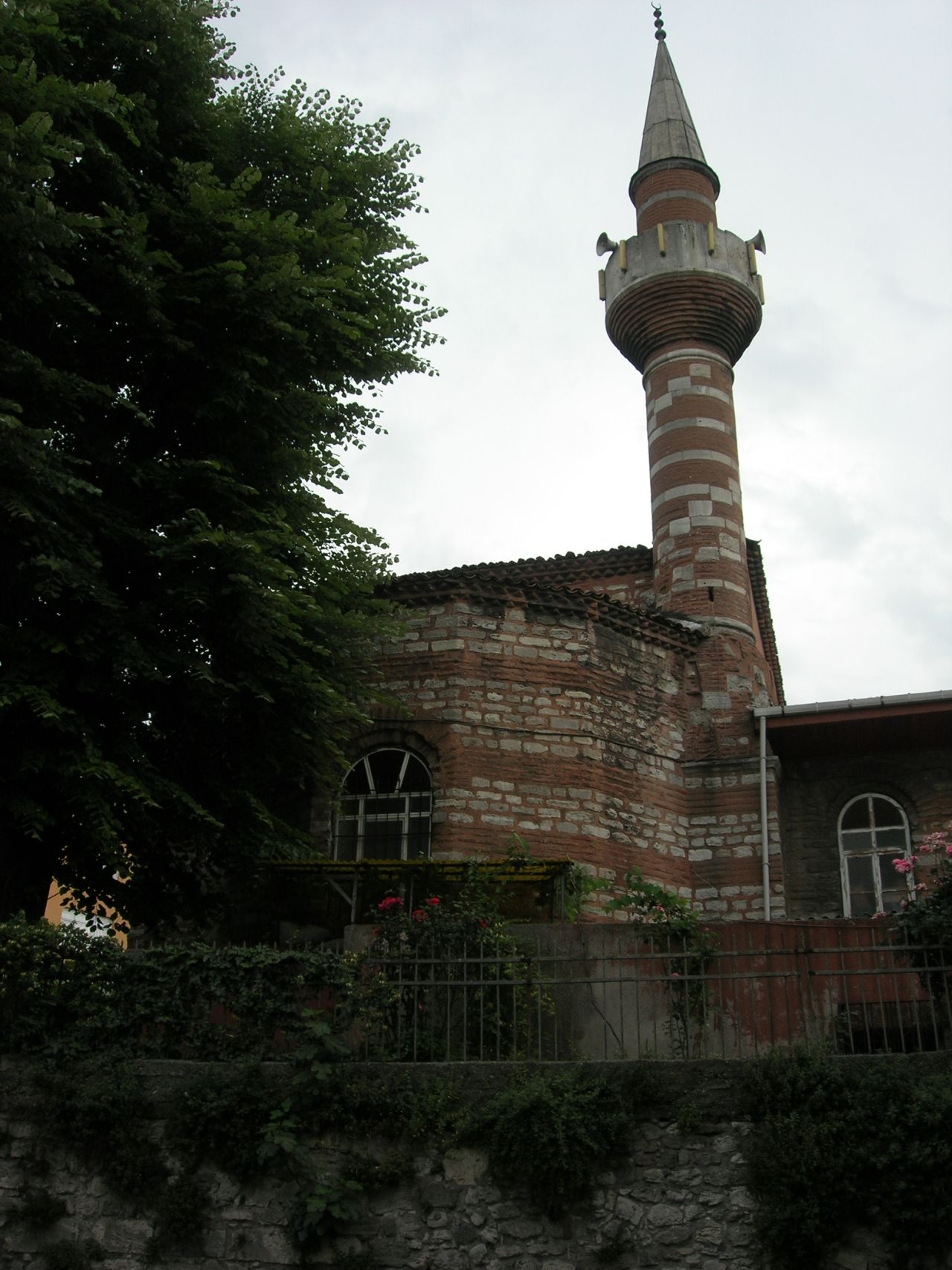
The apse of the mosque with the minaret seen from the north. From here, the alternate courses of bricks and stone are clearly visible.

The building is a large hall, 22.6 meter long by 7.22 wide, and is oriented in north–south direction, which is quite uncommon among the Byzantine churches in Constantinople. Its masonry consists of alternate courses of bricks and stones. The original building had a triple-nave plan, but the only remains of the side aisles belong to the end wall of the western one. To the north side there is an arch and a semicircular apse made of bricks, which outside has a polygonal shape. The walls of the apse are indented by two niches. The main aisle has walls which are lighted by two ranges of windows, which are irregularly spaced. The southern wall is also lighted by two ranges of windows. The lower windows are much larger than the higher. The entrance is situated in the middle of the western wall. Under the western side there is a cistern, whose roof rests on three columns.

The dating of the edifice is uncertain. The polygonal apse and the niches in the apse are typical of the churches of Palaiologan foundation. The building is architecturally interesting because it is an example of reproposition of the early Christian Basilica form during the later Byzantine period.
