= Vefa Stadium =

Football stadium in Fatih, Istanbul, Turkey

Vefa Stadı
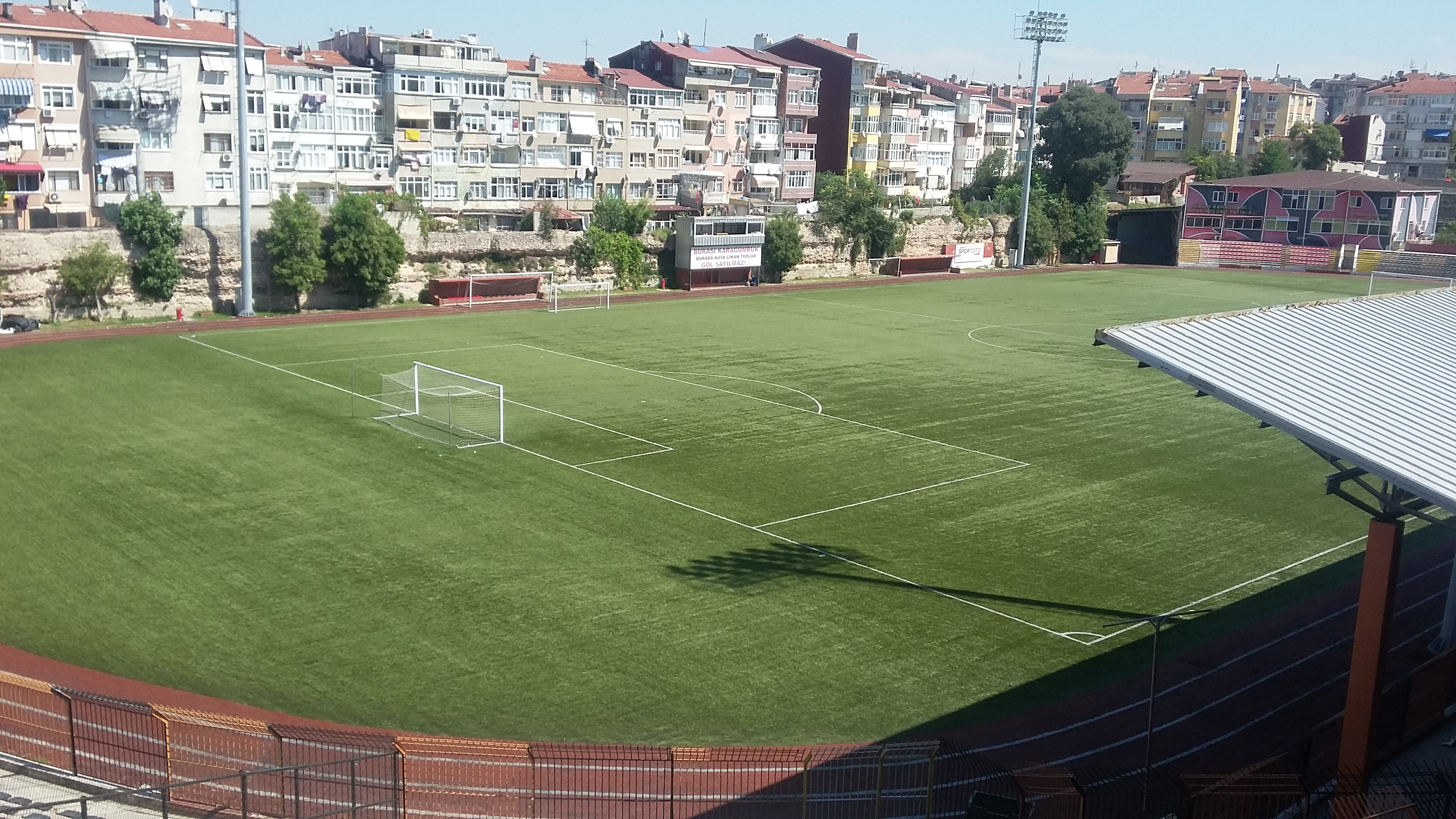
- Interactive map of Vefa Stadı
- Former names: Çukurbostan Sahası
- Location: Fatih, Istanbul
- Coordinates: 41°1′40″N 28°56′20″E
- Owner: Gençlik ve Spor Genel Müdürlüğü
- Capacity: 12,500 (all seated); 6,500 (pre-construction)
- Surface: Grass (Natural)

Construction
- Built: 1926
- Opened: 1945-46
- Renovated: 2007-08
- Cost: 30.000.000 TRY

Tenants
- Fatih Karagümrük; Vefa SK

Vefa Stadı (English: Vefa Stadium) (also named Karagümrük Stadı/Arena) is a football stadium located in Fatih, Istanbul that is the home ground of Fatih Karagümrük.

Vefa Stadı is occasionally in use for the promotional play-off encounters in lower-tier leagues, other sports including American football and for public holiday ceremonies.

== History ==
Karagümrük Stadium was initially used as a football home ground in 1926, in the middle of a dip garden waves from Byzantium Era, called Çukurbostan in Çukurbostan district of Fatih. Stadium is constructed in Aetius Cistern, on Fevzi Paşa Caddesi (English: Fevzi Paşa Avenue), heading to Edirnekapı district of Fatih. Due to the Byzantiumeferences, the cistern is built in AD 420, by praetorian prefect Aetius during the rule of Theodosius II (reigned between 408 – 450). The cistern is 244x84 m. and 15 m. deeper than surface, surrounded by 15 m. high walls. Due to the archeological importance of the cistern, the walls had been protected at the initial stadium project.

The conversion had been started in 1926. In 1945, when the stadium construction was finalized, the tenant rights were taken over by Hasan Âli Yücel, an alumnus of Vefa Lisesi and former Minister of National Education, and given to by Vefa SK, another football club of the district; as Stadium also was renamed Vefa Stadı.

=== Renovation ===
The renovation of stadium has begun to be conducted in 2007, with 30.000.000 TRY grand cost, consisting of 11.722 seated 3 all-covered stands (including 7.648 behind the goal, 1.024 for away side and 24 seats for visitors), one 66m2 VIP lodge, 6 normal lodges, and a 682 seats capacity VIP stand. The project also includes basketball, table tennis, and martial arts facilities.

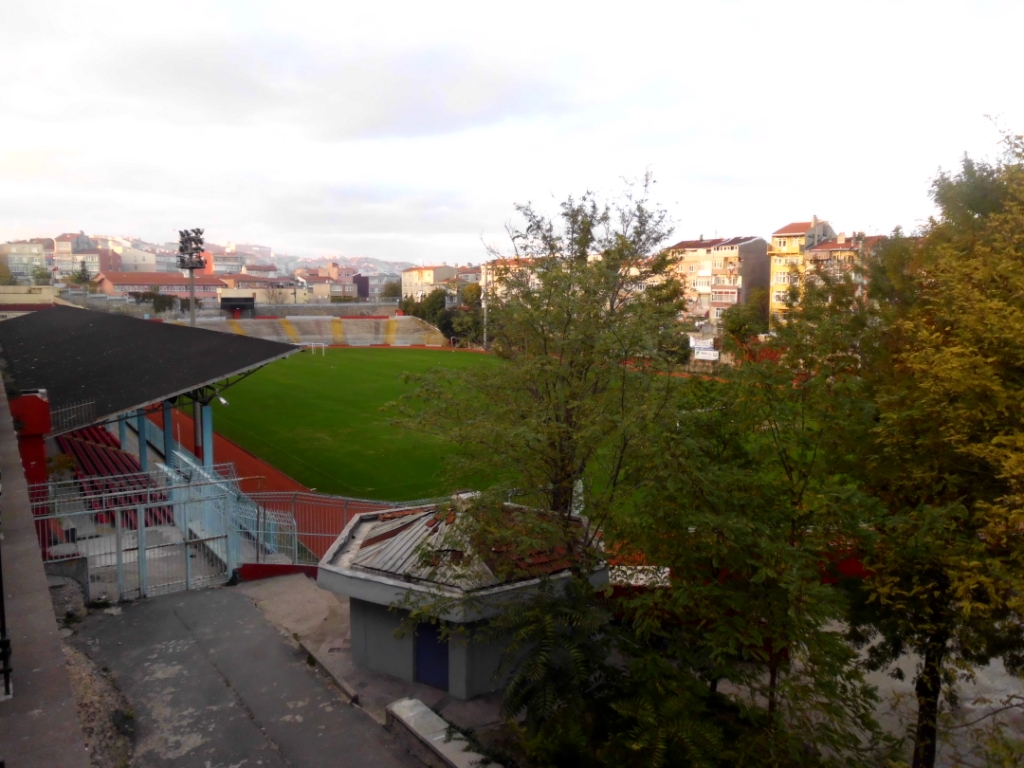
Stadium view from the avenue

== See also ==
- Cistern of Aetius
