= Wolfgang Müller-Wiener =

- Born: 17 May 1923; Friedrichswerth
- Died: 25 March 1991 (aged 67); Istanbul
- Occupations: Architect, historian, archaeologist

Wolfgang Müller-Wiener (Friedrichswerth, Thuringia, 17 May 1923 - Istanbul, Turkey, 25 March 1991) was a German architecture historian, archaeologist and Byzantinist.

After an apprenticeship as a carpenter, from 1948 to 1951, he studied architecture at the Karlsruhe Institute of Technology and he got a Doctorate in 1954 on the theme of Development of industrial building in Baden. From 1962 to 1967 he was the second director of the German Archaeological Institute in Cairo and during this time he directed the excavations at Abu Mena by Alexandria. After his habilitation in 1965 at the Karlsruhe Institute of Technology, in 1967 he was appointed full professor of history of architecture at the Technische Hochschule Darmstadt. In 1976, he was elected the first director of the Istanbul Branch of the German Archaeological Institute (DAI). His main interests during this period were the topography of Constantinople and ancient Istanbul, the castles of the Eastern Mediterranean and the architectural history of Miletus, where from 1974 until his retirement in 1988, he led the excavations. In this Ionian archaeological site he studied with Berthold Weber three Hellenistic temples and Heroa, and in addition early Christian buildings.

== Works ==
- Das Theater von Epidauros, W. Kohlhammer, Stuttgart 1961. (with Armin von Gerkan)
- Mittelalterliche Befestigungen im südlichen Ionien. In: Istanbuler Mitteilungen. Bd. 11, ISSN 0341-9142, 1961, S. 5–122.
- Die Stadtbefestigungen von Izmir, Sigacik und Çandarli: Bemerkungen zur mittelalterlichen Topographie des nördlichen Ionien. In: Istanbuler Mitteilungen. Bd. 12, 1962, S. 59–114.
- Burgen der Kreuzritter im Heiligen Land, auf Zypern und in der Ägäis. Deutscher Kunstverlag, München u. a. 1966.
- Bildlexikon zur Topographie Istanbuls. Byzantion, Konstantinupolis, Istanbul bis zum Beginn des 17. Jahrhundert. Wasmuth, Tübingen 1977, ISBN 3-8030-1022-5.
- Von der Polis zum Kastron. In: Gymnasium. Bd. 93, 1986, ZDB-ID 0017-5943, S. 435–475.
- Griechisches Bauwesen in der Antike. Beck, München 1988, ISBN 3-406-32993-4.
- Die Häfen von Byzantion, Konstantinupolis, Istanbul. Wasmuth, Tübingen 1994, ISBN 3-8030-1042-X.

== Sources ==
- Wolf Koenigs: In Memoriam Wolfgang Müller-Wiener 17.5.1923 – 25.3.1991. In: Istanbuler Mitteilungen. Bd. 41, 1991, S. 13–16.
- Martin Dennert, Otto Feld: Schriftenverzeichnis Wolfgang Müller-Wiener. In: Istanbuler Mitteilungen. Bd. 41, 1991, S. 17–24.
- Wulf Schirmer: Wolfgang Müller-Wiener, 17.5.1923 – 25.3.1991. In: Architectura. Bd. 21, 1991, ISSN 0044-863X, S. 1–2.
- Wolf Koenigs (1997). "Müller-Wiener, Wolfgang". Neue Deutsche Biographie (in German). Vol. 18. Berlin: Duncker & Humblot. p. 512. (full text online).
- Elfriede Müller-Wiener: Wolfgang Müller-Wiener (1923–1991). Sein Lebensweg aufgezeichnet für die Familie, seine Freunde und Mitarbeiter. s. n., Darmstadt 1995.
