= Ernest Mamboury =

Swiss historian (1878–1953)

Ernest Mamboury (1 April 1878 - 23 September 1953) was a Swiss scholar renowned for his works on the historic structures in Turkish cities, particularly on Byzantine art and architecture in Istanbul.

== Biography ==
Mamboury was born 1878 in Signy-Avenex, Switzerland. He studied in the École Normale of Lausanne (1894–1898), in Geneva (1898–1903) and the Académie Julian in Paris (1904–1905).

In 1909 he became a professor of French language and literature at Galatasaray High School in Constantinople (Istanbul), Ottoman Empire.

Throughout his life in Istanbul, which lasted for more than forty years until his death in 1953, Mamboury dedicated most of his literary works on the Byzantine structures of this city, as well as other significant historic monuments in Istanbul and Ankara.

Ernest Mamboury died in Istanbul on 23 September 1953, and was buried at the Feriköy Protestant Cemetery, Istanbul in the Feriköy district of Şişli north of Taksim Square.

== Works ==
=== Guides ===
- Constantinople: guide touristique. Constantinople, Rizzo 1925
- Istanbul. Rehber-i Seyyahîn. Istanbul, Rizzo 1924
- Constantinople: tourists' guide. Constantinople, Rizzo & Son 1926
- Constantinople: guide touristique. 2. éd. française. Constantinople, Rizzo 1929
- Stambul. Reiseführer. Übersetzt v. Johs. Ahlers. Erste deutsche Ausgabe. Vervollständigt bis 1930. Stambul, John A. Rizzo 1930.
- Byzance - Constantinople - Istanbul: guide touristique. 3. éd.. Galata [u.a.], Milli Neşriyat Yurdu 1934
- Istanbul touristique. Ed. française mise à jour à fin mars 1951. Galata, Istanbul, Çituri Biraderler Basımevi 1951
- The tourists' Istanbul. English ed. translated by Malcolm Burr. Istanbul, Çituri Biraderler Basımevi 1953
- Ankara: guide touristique, Haidar-Pacha - Ankara; Bogaz-Keuy, Euyuk, Sivri-Hissar et environs, Tchangiri, Yozgat, etc. Ankara, Ministère Turc de l'Intérieur 1933
- Ankara: guide touristique. 2. éd. française. Ankara, Ministère Turc de l'Intérieur 1934
- Les Îles des Princes. Banlieue maritime d'Istanbul ... Guide touristique [Publications touristiques. vol. 2B.] Istanbul, Maarif Matbaası 1943
- Turquie, Les guides bleus. Ed. établie par Ernest Mamboury et Robert Boulanger. Paris, Hachette 1958.

=== Other works ===
- Ruines Byzantines autour d'Odalar-Djamisi à Stambul, Échos d'Orient 19, 1920, 69–73.
- Le couvent byzantin de femmes à Prinkipo, Échos d'Orient 19, 1920, 200–208.
- Ruines Byzantines de Mara, entre Maltépé et Bostandjik, Échos d'Orient 19, 1920, 322–330.
- Le Harem des Sultans, in: L'Illustration 88, 4553, 7. Juni 1930, 226–232.
- Die Moschee Mehmeds des Eroberers und die neue Bibliothek im Serail des Sultans von Stambul, Die Denkmalpflege 1931, 161–167.
- Die Kaiserpaläste von Konstantinopel zwischen Hippodrom und Marmara-Meer, (with Theodor Wiegand) Berlin, Leipzig, de Gruyter 1934
- Un nouvelle élément pour la topographie de l'antique Byzance, Archäologischer Anzeiger 1934, 50–61.
- Şile, Türkiye Turing ve Otomobil Kurumu Bülteni 5, 13–76, 1934, 23–24.
- Nos mosquées de Stamboul,(translated from Halil Edhem) Istanbul, Librairie Kanaat 1934
- Les fouilles Byzantines à Istanbul et dans sa banlieue immédiate aux XIX et XXe siècles. Byzantion 11, 1936, 229–283.
- Le nouvelle citerne Byzantine de Tchifté Sérail (Istanbul), Byzantion 11, 1936, 167–190.
- Une inscription datée sur une tour Byzantine de Constantinople (withRobert Demangel) Bulletin Correspondence Hellenique 60, 1936, 208–213.
- L'influence de l'art Turc dans les constructions religieuses roumaines, Annales de Turquie 6, 1936, No 3, 17–29.
- Le developpement d'Istanbul depuis la conquête jusqu'à nos jours, Türkiye Turing ve Otomobil Kurumu Bülteni 7, 16–89, 1937, 19–25.
- Le développement d'Istanbul depuis la conquête jusqu'à nos jours, Bulletin de l'Union française, Istanbul No 4, juillet 1937, 8–18.
- L'art Turc du XVIIIème siècle, La Turquie Kémaliste 19, 1937, 2–11.
- Les fouilles Byzantines à Istanbul et dans sa banlieue immédiate en 1936-1937. Byzantion 13, 1938, 301 310.
- Bursa la verdoynte, Les annales de Turquie 8, Juni 1938
- Le quartier des Manganes et la première région de Constantinople (with Robert Demangel), Paris, de Boccard 1939.
- Une des plus beaux coins de la Turquie republicaine: la fôret de pins à pignons de Kozak, La Turquie Kémaliste 31, 1939, 34–38.
- Topographic de Sainte-Sophie, le sanctuaire et la solea, le mitatorion, le puits Sacré, le passage de St Nicolas etc., Atti del V Congresso di studi bizantini 2, Rom 1940, 197–209.
- Istanbul'un ilk Ahalisi, Geçit - Review Januar-Februar 1940, 53-55 = Türkiye Turing ve Otomobil Kurumu Bülteni 54, 1946, 53–55.
- 1939-1940 Yıllarında Istanbul'da Müşahede Edilen Original bir Tabiat Hâdisesi, Ilk Öğretim 57, 14. April 1940, 634.
- Préface, in: Benedetto Palazzo: L'Arap Djami ou église Saint Paul à Galata, Istanbul 1946, IX-XI.
- Les guerres entre les Scythes et les Mèdes et leur incidence sur l'historie de Byzance, Türkiye Turing ve Otomobil Kurumu Bülteni 66, 1947, S. 27–28.
- Les necropoles de Byzance, Türkiye Turing ve Otomobil Kurumu Bülteni 79, 1948, 27-30 = Bizans Mezarlıkları, in: Cumhuriyet, 28. Juni 1948
- Bursa. Ankara, Direction générale de la presse, de la radiodifussion et du tourisme 1949.
- Les briques Byzantines marquées du chrisme, Annuaire de l’Institut de Philologie et d’Histoire Orientales 9, 1949, 449–462.
- Une nouvelle lecture raisonnée des inscriptions de briques Byzantines et l'emploi de ces dernières dans la datation des monuments des Ve et VIe siècles, Byzantion 19, 1949, 113–125.
- Les parages du temple de Rome et d'Auguste à Ankara, Türk Tarih, Arkeologya ve Etnografya Dergisi 5, 1949, 96–102.
- L'art chrétien en Anatolie, Türkiye Turing ve Otomobil Kurumu Bülteni 98, 1950, 20–22.
- Nouvelles fouilles archéologiques sur l'emplacement de l'Hippodrome, Türkiye Turing ve Otomobil Kurumu Bülteni 107, 1950, 24-28 = Adalet Sarayının Arsasındaki Eserler, Türkiye Turing ve Otomobil Kurumu Bülteni 108, 1951, 17–19.
- Les fouilles Byzantine à Istanbul et ses environs et les trouvailles archéologiques faites au cours de constructions au de travaux officials et privés depuis 1936, Byzantion 21, 1951, 425–459.
- Contribution à la topographie générale de Constantinople, in: Actes du VIe Congress Internationale d' Études Byzantines Paris 1948, Bd. II, Paris 1951, 243–253.
- Le Forum de Constantin; la chapelle de St. Constantin et les mystères de la Colonne Brulée. Resultats des sondages opérés en 1929 et 1930, in: Pepragmena tu Diethnus Byzantinologiku Synedriu Thessaloniki 1953, Thessaloniki 1955, 275–288.
- La Suisse nouvelle province d'art byzantin, in: Pepragmena tu Diethnus Byzantinologiku Synedriu Thessaloniki 1953, Thessaloniki 1955, 281–285.
- Appendix IV, In: Cyril Mango: The Brazen House: a study of the vestibule of the Imperial Palace of Constantinople. Kopenhagen 1959, 182–188.
