= History of the Jews in Istanbul =

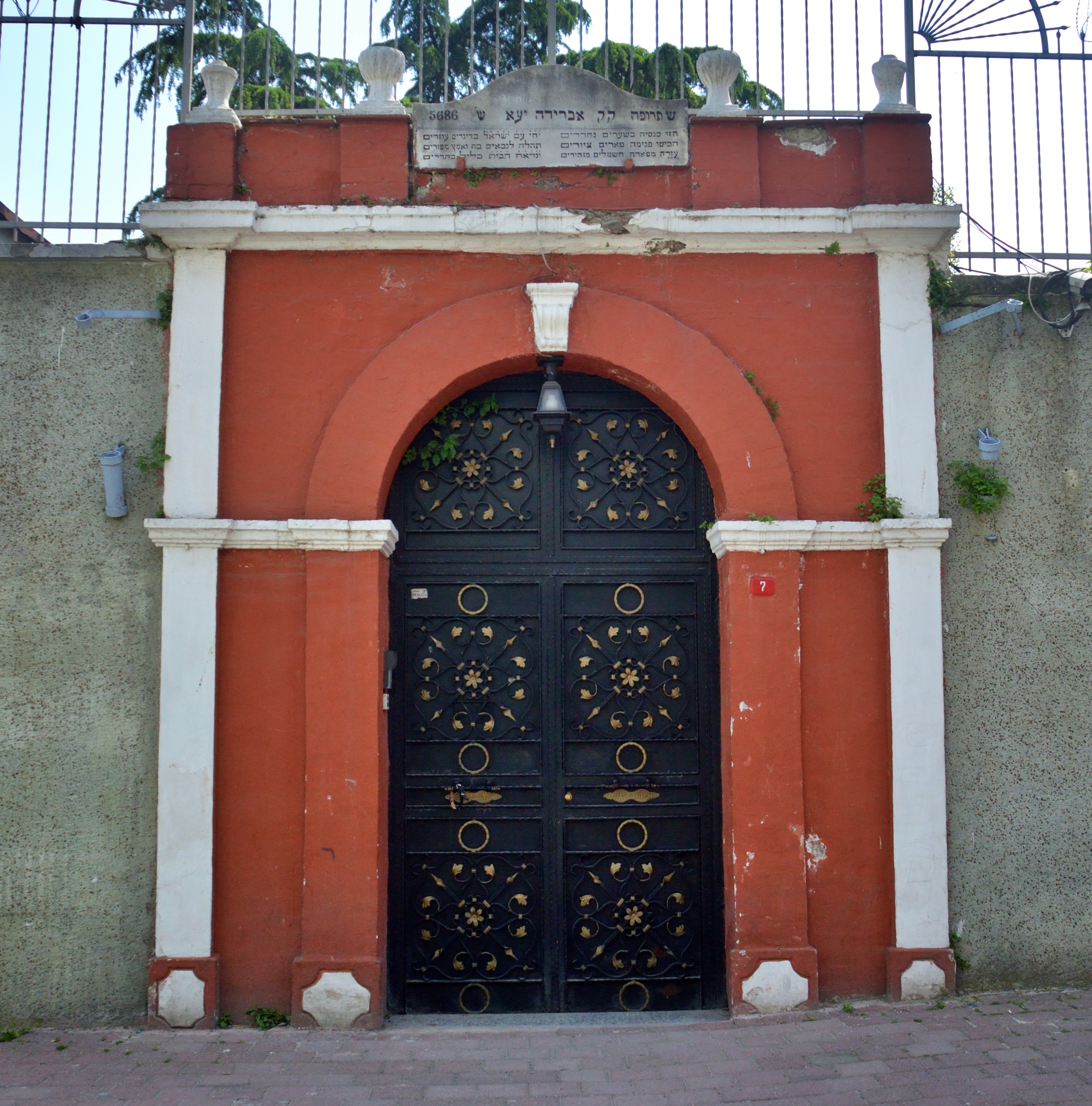
Ahrida Synagogue, one of the oldest synagogues in Istanbul, located in Balat, once a thriving Jewish quarter in the city

Istanbul emerged as one of the world's most important Jewish centers in the 16th and 17th centuries. The origins of the Jewish community in Istanbul date back long before the Fall of Constantinople. Official documents refer to Jews in Constantinople as early as 390 CE.

Unlike Jews in Europe, Ottoman Jews were allowed to work in any profession and could also enter the Ottoman court. Ottoman Jews in Istanbul excelled in commerce and trade and came to dominate the medical profession. Although they made up only 10% of the city population, Jews accounted for 62% of licensed doctors in 1600.

== History ==
=== 408 to 1453 ===
Theodosius II (reigned from the death of his father when he was 7, in 408, until 450), was the first Byzantine emperor to restrict the rights of the city's Jews. He ordered their expulsion from the city proper, and assigned them a quarter on the other side of the Golden Horn, called the Stanum (modern Beyoğlu). Until then, the Jewish community had occupied a special quarter known as the "copper market" in the city itself, where they had a synagogue, which was later converted into the Church of the Holy Mother. According to Ibn Verga in his Scepter of Judah, the expulsion from the city was a measure of clemency to force the Jews to embrace Christianity. This claim is disputed by historians, as is the historicity of the entire text.

Emperor Justinian I (r527–565) was the first to intervene directly in the religious affairs of the Jews, when he forbade them from celebrating Passover before the Christian Easter. Emperor Heraclius I (610–641) massacred thousands of Jews in Palestine during the Byzantine–Sasanian War, and ordered the baptism of all remaining Jews in his kingdom. However, although there are no documents about the fate of the Jews in Constantinople at the time, it appears that they received the protection of Heraclius' wide, Martina, and her son, Heraclonus (who later became Emperor Heraclius Constantine).

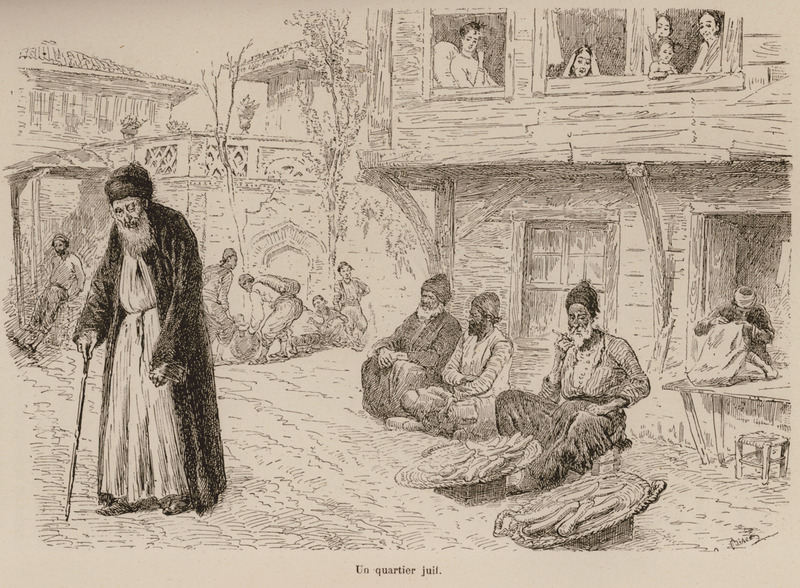
The Golden Horn: Kasskoj (Hasköy) or the Jewish ghetto, illustration by Cesare Biseo for the book Constantinople (1878) by Edmondo de Amicis

During the Byzantine Iconoclasm, Jews were heavily persecuted. During the reign of Emperor Leo IV the Khazar (775–780), and later during the reign of Basil I (867 - 886), the community was completely destroyed. However, since it was the Byzantine capital and the biggest economical center of the period, the community recovered after Leo VI (886–911) restored religious freedom to the Jews. Benjamin of Tudela, who visited Constantinople in 1176, reported that the Jews lived outside the city limits. The community numbered two thousand Rabbanite Jews and five hundred Karaites. Some were engaged in silk production, others were merchants, and some were extremely wealthy. Rabbi Solomon of Egypt even served as the king's physician, and the Jews enjoyed his influence in the ranks of the government. Although, the general attitude towards them was still negative.

=== 1453 to 1660 ===
The Ottoman conquest of Constantinople vastly improved the situation of the Jews in the city, and made it grow larger. Sultan Mehmed II made Constantinople his capital city, and saw a need to repopulate it. For this goal he started transferring populations from all around the empire into the city. During that policy, Jews from the Greek, Macedonian, Albanian, Bulgarian, and Turkish communities were brought to Istanbul. Almost all of the Jews who were brought to the city during the twenty years this policy took place were Romaniote. Although it was illegal for the transferred people to leave Istanbul, Ottoman documents show that already in the 70s of the 15th century some of them returned to the Balkans.

According to a census conducted in 1478, approximately 7,000 or 8,000 Jews lived in the city. Until 1688, the Romaniote community formed the majority in the city (55.6% of all Jews in 1608, 57% in 1623 and 27.8% in 1688).

The fabric of the Ottoman Jewish society changed with waves of immigration of Ashkenazi, Sephardi, and Italian Jews, who all built separate and autonomous congregations. In the 16th and 17th centuries, a significant number of congregations named "Seniora" was founded by the financial support of Gracia Mendes Nasi for the anusim from Portugal settling in Istanbul. Ashkenazi Jews continued to settle in Istanbul in the 15th, 16th, 17th, and 20th centuries, and despite forming only 5.9% of all Jews in the city in 1608, they were slow to assimilate among the Sephardi Jews, who came to form the majority of Jews in Istanbul by 1688.

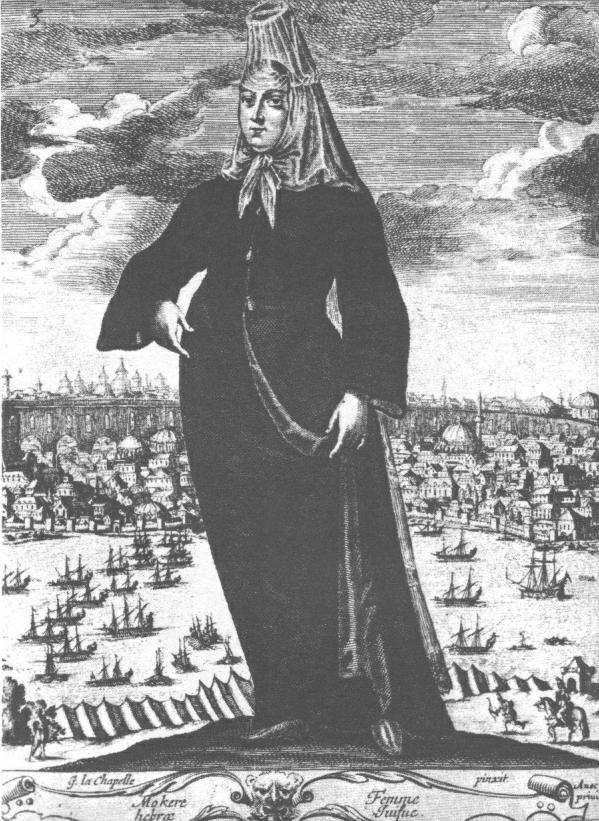
Jewish woman in Istanbul, middle of the 17th century. Engraving by G. la Chapelle from Recueil de divers portraits des principales dames de la Porte du Grand Turc, c. 1650

Sephardi and Portuguese communities in Istanbul had an elected leadership, called the "Ma'amad". It was elected for a fixed term — one, two, or more years — and usually had equal representation for all of the community's economic classes, despite the fact the rich were only a minority. Members of the Ma'amad appointed their successors, and as a result, only a few families controlled it. Representatives of each Ma'amad participated in meetings of all the Ma'amadim in the city, which served as the city's Jewish leadership. Each community also had a role called "Marbitz Torah", who presided over the community's court and made decisions on questions about religious matters. He was elected by the community, with the consent of the public, for a limited period. The Marbitz Torah was also responsible for religious instruction, especially for adults. He preached in the synagogue and was the community's representative in the municipal assembly of Marbitzei Torah, which discussed religious matters that affected everyone, including legislation. Each community supplied its members with education, economical help, burial, a gravesite, and a synagogue. The community paid taxes as on body, even though the poll tax was supposed to be personal, the communities managed the negotiations with the authorities over the taxes, and paid them together. The community members decided among themselves who was exempt from taxes, such as Talmidei Chakhamim in some communities, and paid them for those who were too poor to do so themselves. The communities' courts held no legal power, but were respected as if they do by the communities.

In this period, there were many Jews who entered the Ottoman court. For instance, Hekim Jacob first entered the Ottoman court as the personal physician to Mehmed II and later became his financial adviser, translator, diplomat to Venice, treasurer, and vizier. As a result of this distinguished service, Mehmed II bestowed a tax exemption to Hekim Jacob and his descendants in the Ottoman Empire. Using their political connections, Ottoman Jewish communities also exerted political pressure on foreign countries. For instance, responding to the burning of the anusim in Ancona in 1555, Gracia Mendes Nasi and Joseph Nasi convinced the Ottoman court to ban trade to Ancona and transfer the Ottoman mercantile representatives to the city Pesaro.

=== 1660 to 1800 ===
According to Ottoman documents from the 17th century there were almost 40 Jewish communities in Istanbul. Until the Great Fire of 1660, the communities were divided according to the origin of each one, and separated between the different branches. Even though there were some trends of integration and transition between them, in general, separation was maintained. For hundreds of years, Eminönü was the main location of the Jews in Istanbul. Ottoman documents from the end of the 16th century show that 60% of the Jews of Istanbul lived in Eminönü, most of them Romaniotes. In the 24th of July 1660 a fire broke out in a shop to the west of Eminönü, which spread to all directions and burned entire neighborhoods. Two thirds of Istanbul were destroyed in the fire, and 40 thousand people died in the 49 hours of the fire. The Ottoman authorities, headed by the Valide sultan Hadice Turhan Sultan, used the fire as an opportunity to expel the Jews from Eminönü, and complete the construction of a mosque in the quarter. They also ordered the transfer of the lands of synagogues destroyed by the fire to the state treasury. Imperial decrees also required the sale of Jewish property in the area to Muslims, and prohibited the renting of residence to Jews. Most of the Jews moved to live on the other side of the Golden Horn, in Hasköy, which had already been a center of Karaite Jews at the beginning of the 16h century.

This transfer caused significant changes in the structure of the Jewish community. The old order of multiple independent communities was completely erased. This phenomenon was common mostly among the Romaniotes, who were the biggest victims of the fire and the official policy. In comparison of Ottoman documents from 1623 to those from 1688-1689, it seems as though the amount of Romaniote taxpayers remained the same, while the Sephardic population almost doubled. During this time, most of the Romaniote community integrated into the Sephardic, and many members even gave up their Greek language.

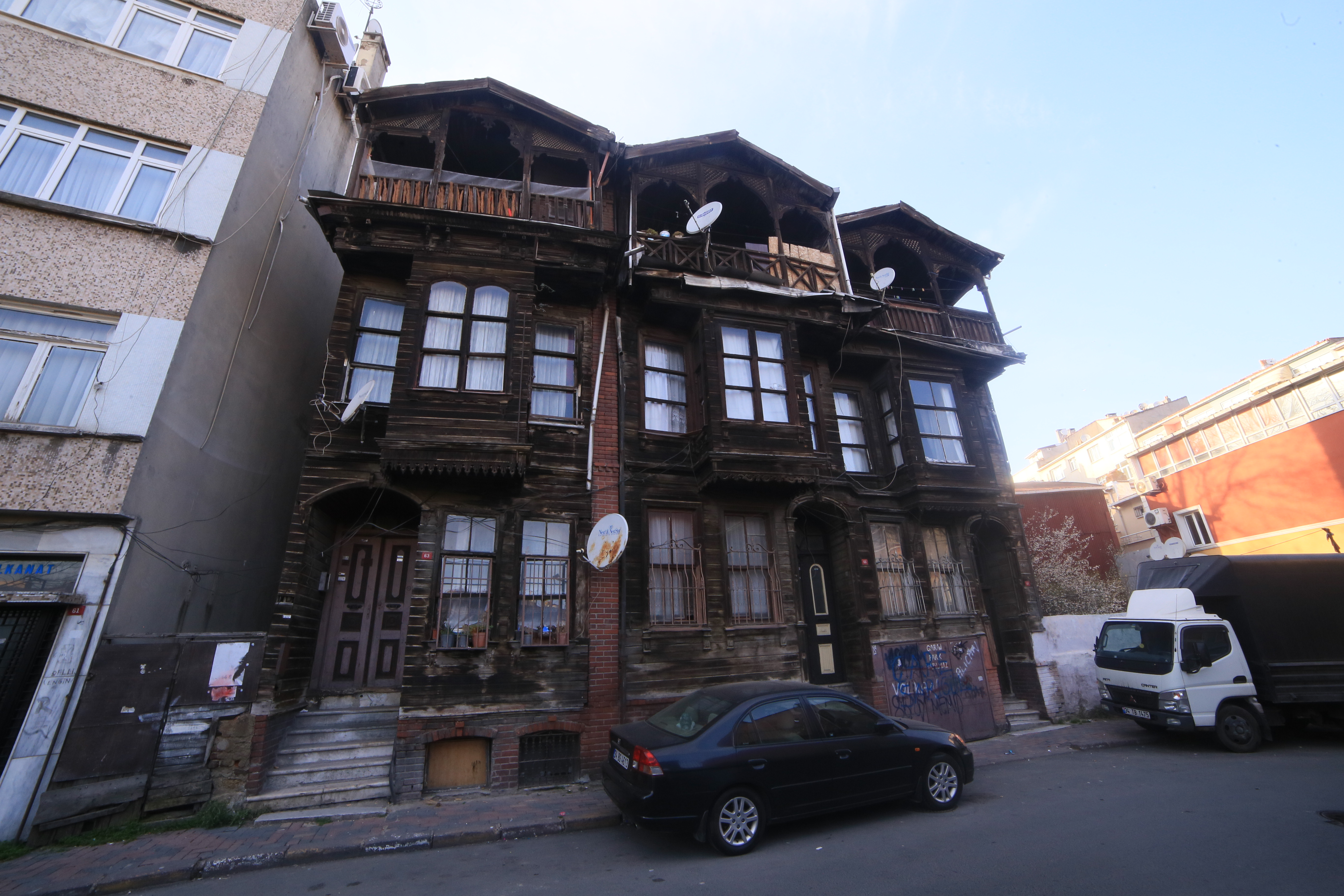
Old Jewish wooden house in Fatih

According to different estimates, the number of Jews at the end of the 17th century was roughly 25 to 30 thousand, about a tenth of the city's inhabitants. Until the end of the 18th century, the population stayed relatively stable, or it could have increased a bit, up to 40 thousand Jews. In the 18th century, the Ottoman Jews of Istanbul suffered economic disadvantages because of growing economic competition with the European-backed Christians, who were able to compete unfairly through a series of special advantages granted to them through capitulations of the Ottoman Empire. For instance, the French settlers in the city had many additional economic rights, were protected by foreign ambassadors, and also benefited from preferential tax rates. Despite the economic decline of the community, local Jews still were in prominent positions. By 1800, Ottoman Jews made up 5% of the city and 27% of all licensed physicians in Istanbul. In the 1700s, using the printing press, books came to be published in Spanish and Ladino.

=== 1800 to 1923 ===
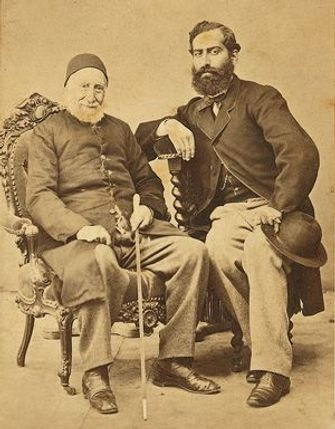
Count Abraham Camondo and his grandson Nissim de Camondo in Paris, c. 1868

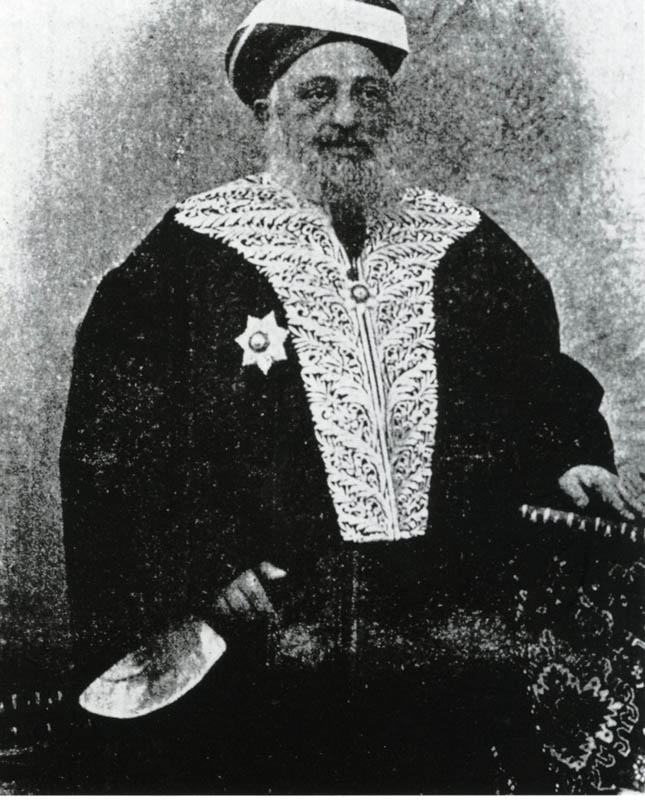
Moses Levi, the Chief Rabbi (Hakham Bashi) of Constantinople and of the Ottoman Empire, circa 1880

In the 19th century, there was a general atmosphere of tolerance between Jews and Turks. In 1835, the Ottoman leadership created the role of the Hakham Bashi, which was in theory supposed to be the head of all the Jewish communities in the Ottoman empire and their representative to the authorities, but in practice was primarily the representative of the community in Istanbul and its surroundings. The official recognition of Jews as Millet and the Tanzimat reforms improved the situation of the Jews throughout all the empire.

However, the relations of the Jewish community with Christians were usually bad. Following the death of the Greek Patriarch, the three Jewish physicians who cared for him were lynched, and the subsequent Greek rioting injured an estimated 5,000 Jews. In 1856, a blood libel case occurred at Balat, where a mob of Greeks and Armenians started attacking Jews and looting Jewish businesses.

Around the end of the 19th century, the Jewish community in Istanbul numbered almost 100,000 Jews, among them the majority Sephardic community and thousands of Ashkenazi immigrants from Eastern Europe. Active Jewish life took place in the city during the 19th and early 20th centuries. From the second half of the 19th century, a Jewish press began to develop in Istanbul. Dozens of Jewish newspapers and magazines were published in Ladino, French, Hebrew, and Turkish. Some of the greats of Ladino literature at that time were living in Istanbul, such as Rabbi Yaakov Culi and Rabbi Avraham Ben Yitzhak Asa.

During the reign of the sultan Abdülmecid I the authorities allowed the admission of Jews into the military school of medicine and the poll tax was abolished. His legislature strengthened the secular leadership among the Jews all throughout the Ottoman empire.

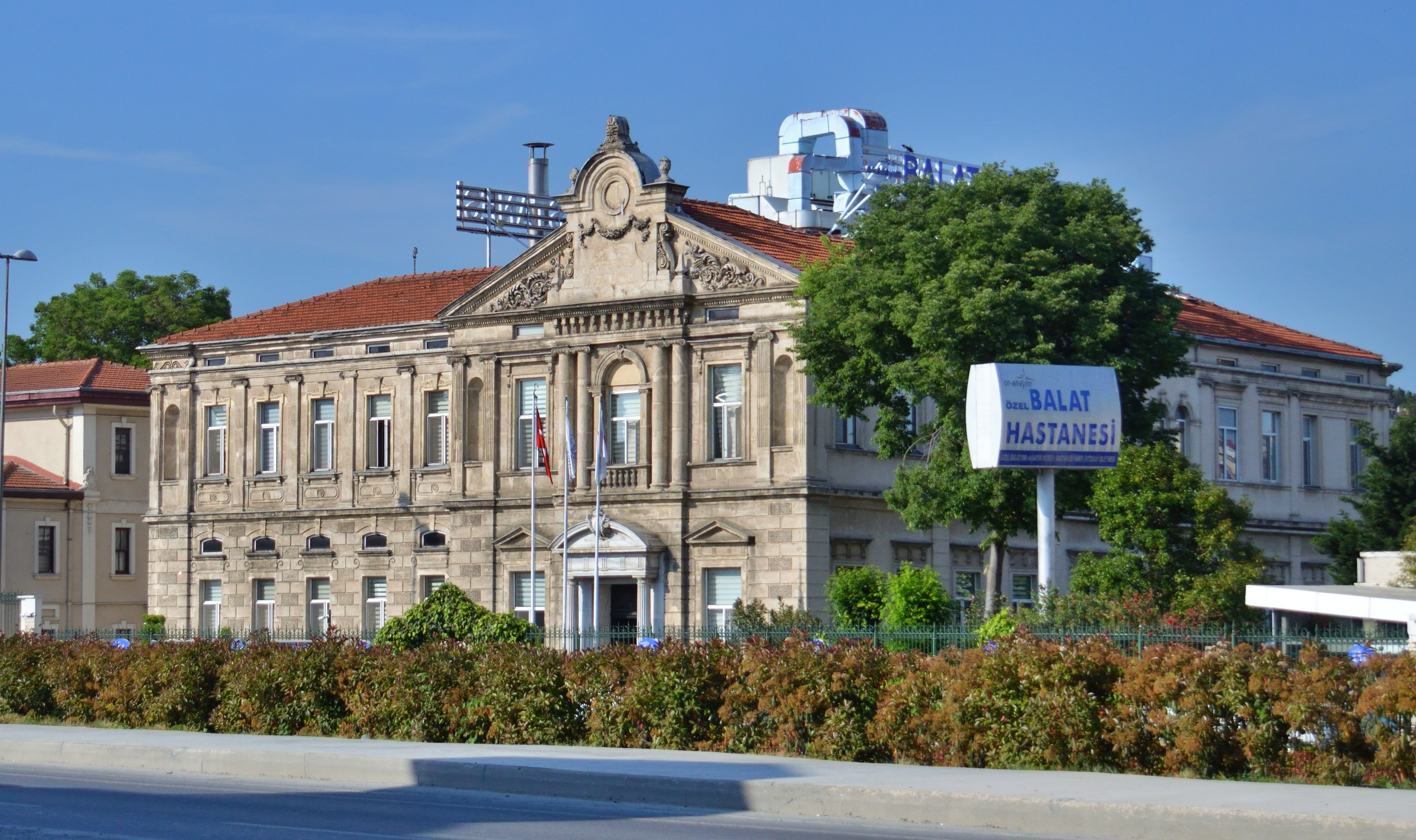
Balat Or-Ahayim Hospital, founded in 1887 as a Jewish hospital

Many Jewish community institutions operated in the city, and during the 19th century there was a transition from traditional to modern education. The first of the modern Jewish schools in the city was the Escola school, founded in 1854 by the Camondo family. In 1887, the Or-Ayahim Jewish Hospital was founded in Istanbul by a number of local doctors and philanthropists, to serve as a charitable institution that would provide free treatment to poor Jews. In 1898, a modern rabbinical school was founded, headed by Rabbi Abraham Danon, a Hebrew scholar, poet, and historian.

In 1911, Baron Hirsch, at the initiative of Rabbi Shmuel Shapira, established an agricultural farm called "Mesila Hadasha" about 25 kilometers away from Istanbul which served as a transit and training station for immigrants to Palestine. The Turks called the place "Yehudi Çiplik", meaning "the village of the Jews". During World War I, Jewish soldiers and officers from Palestine who served in the Turkish army stayed at the farm. They met with Zionist youth "Shvalim Bodedot" to learn Hebrew, poetry, and "Living in the Land of Israel". After the war, with the consent of Joseph Trumpeldor, the farm served as a transit and training station for members of "HeHalutz", from the third Aliyah, on their way to Palestine.

In 1913, the Maccabi S.K. club was established. Among other things, it included a basketball team that was the city champion several times.

=== 1923 to 1949 ===
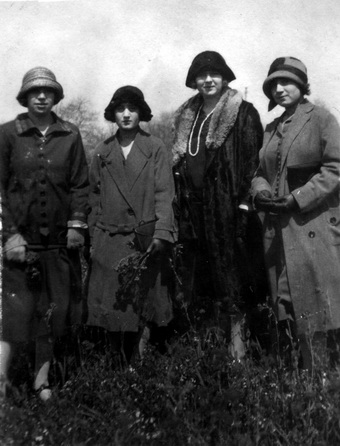
Jewish women of Istanbul in 1930

With the establishment of the Republic of Turkey, the community was prohibited from collecting membership fees and matters of personal status were subjected to civil law. Turkish was mandated as an educational language, replacing the French used by some Jewish schools. It was made illegal for Jews to belong to foreign organizations, such as the World Zionist Organization and the World Jewish Congress.

In 1932, religious instruction in educational institutions was completely abolished. 10 years later, a heavy tax was introduced in the country, and many were forced to sell some of their property to pay it.

In 1948, because of the huge immigration of Turkish Jews to Israel, the number of Jews in Istanbul was estimated at 55,000.

In 1949, the Jewish community was granted internal autonomy, as proposed by a member of the House of Representatives, Shlomo Adato. After that, religious instruction was resumed in Jewish public schools. Young Jews flocked to universities.

=== Today ===
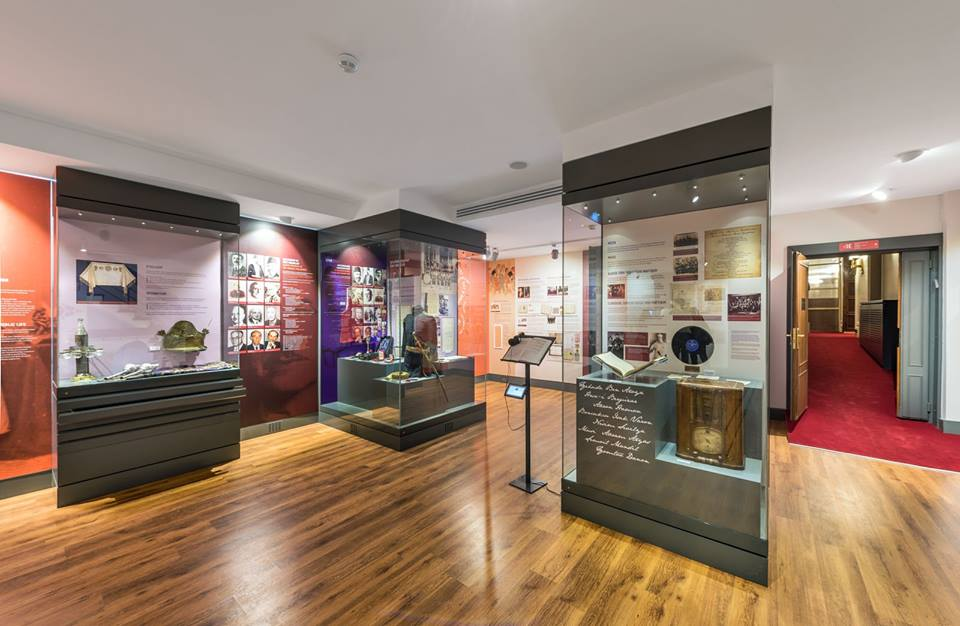
The Quincentennial Foundation Museum of Turkish Jews

In 1950, there were estimated only 55,000 Jews in Istanbul. The number was reduced to 20,000 in 1977, and to 15,000 in 2021. This is in large part due to emigration to Israel.

== See also ==
- Balat, historically a Jewish neighborhood in Istanbul
- Hasköy, historically a neighborhood with a large Jewish community
- History of the Jews in the Ottoman Empire
- History of the Jews in Turkey
- Synagogues in Istanbul
- House of Camondo
- Constantinopolitan Karaites
- Jewish Museum of Turkey
- El Tiempo, a Ladino language newspaper published in Constantinople/Istanbul in the years 1872–1930
- History of the Jews in İzmir
