= Costantinopoli =

Costantinopoli may refer to:

- Italian name of Constantinople, today's Istanbul
- Constantinople (De Amicis book), a 19th century travelogue by Edmondo De Amicis
