= Ahrida Synagogue =

Synagogue in Istanbul, Turkey

- Hebrew: קהל קדוש אכרידה
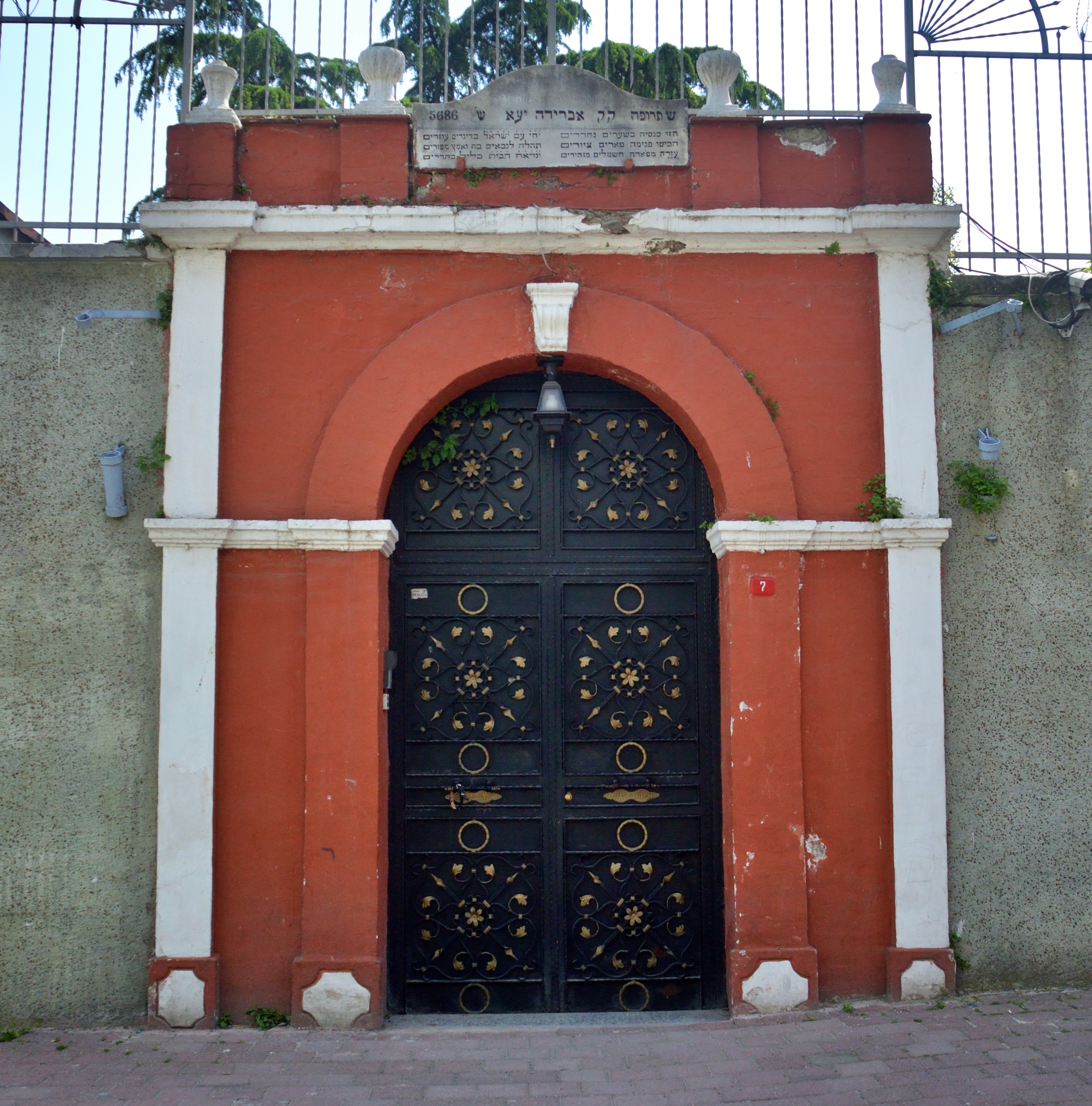
- The entrance to the synagogue in 2022

- The synagogue in Fatih, Istanbul

Religion
- Affiliation: Judaism
- Rite: Nusach Sefard (Eastern)
- Ecclesiastical or organisational status: Synagogue
- Status: Active

Location
- Location: Balat, Fatih, Istanbul
- Country: Turkey
- Coordinates: 41°01′58″N 28°56′44″E

Architecture
- Type: Synagogue architecture
- Style: Ottoman; Byzantine
- Completed: c. 1430; Renovations: 1694, 1732, 1840, 1893, 1926, 1955, 1992
- Materials: Stone

The Ahrida Synagogue (Hebrew: קהל קדוש אכרידה), or Ohrid Synagogue, is a Jewish congregation and synagogue, located in Ayvansaray Mahallesi, in Balat, a once-thriving Jewish quarter of the city, in Fatih, in the Istanbul Province of Turkey. Completed in c. 1430, it is the oldest of all 26 synagogues in the city.

== Design ==
The bimah (teva) of the synagogue is built in the shape of a ship's prow. According to tradition, it represents either Noah's Ark or the Ottoman ships that brought Sephardic Jews from Spain in 1492.

== History ==
It was built by Romaniotes (Greek Jews), dating from the 1430s, from the city of Ohrid (called 'Ahrid' in Greek) in what was then the Ottoman Empire and is now North Macedonia. Sephardi Jews arrived in the Ottoman Empire from the Iberian Peninsula beginning in 1492.

A late 17th-century fire damaged the synagogue, and a ferman was issued in 1694 for its reconstruction in the Baroque style of Tulip Period. A later restoration exposed several layered architectural styles. An 1877 issue of The Illustrated London News depicts a prayer service at the synagogue for an Ottoman victory over Russia, attended by Grand vizier Ibrahim Edhem Pasha, symbolizing a gesture of allegiance.

The synagogue building, one of the two ancient synagogues in Istanbul's Golden Horn, was renovated in 1992 by the Quincentennial Foundation, in celebration of the 500th anniversary of Sephardic Jews' arrival in the Ottoman Empire. The Ahrida Synagogue is known for its boat-shaped tevah (the reading platform, known in Ashkenazi communities as a bimah). The Ahrida Synagogue is also the only synagogue in Istanbul at which Sabbatai Zevi, the founder of the Jewish Sabbatean movement, prayed.

== See also ==
- History of the Jews in Istanbul
- History of the Jews in Turkey
- History of the Jews in Greece
- List of synagogues in Turkey
- Romaniotes
- Jewish ethnic divisions § Geographic distribution
