= Balat, Fatih =

Balat
- Neighbourhood
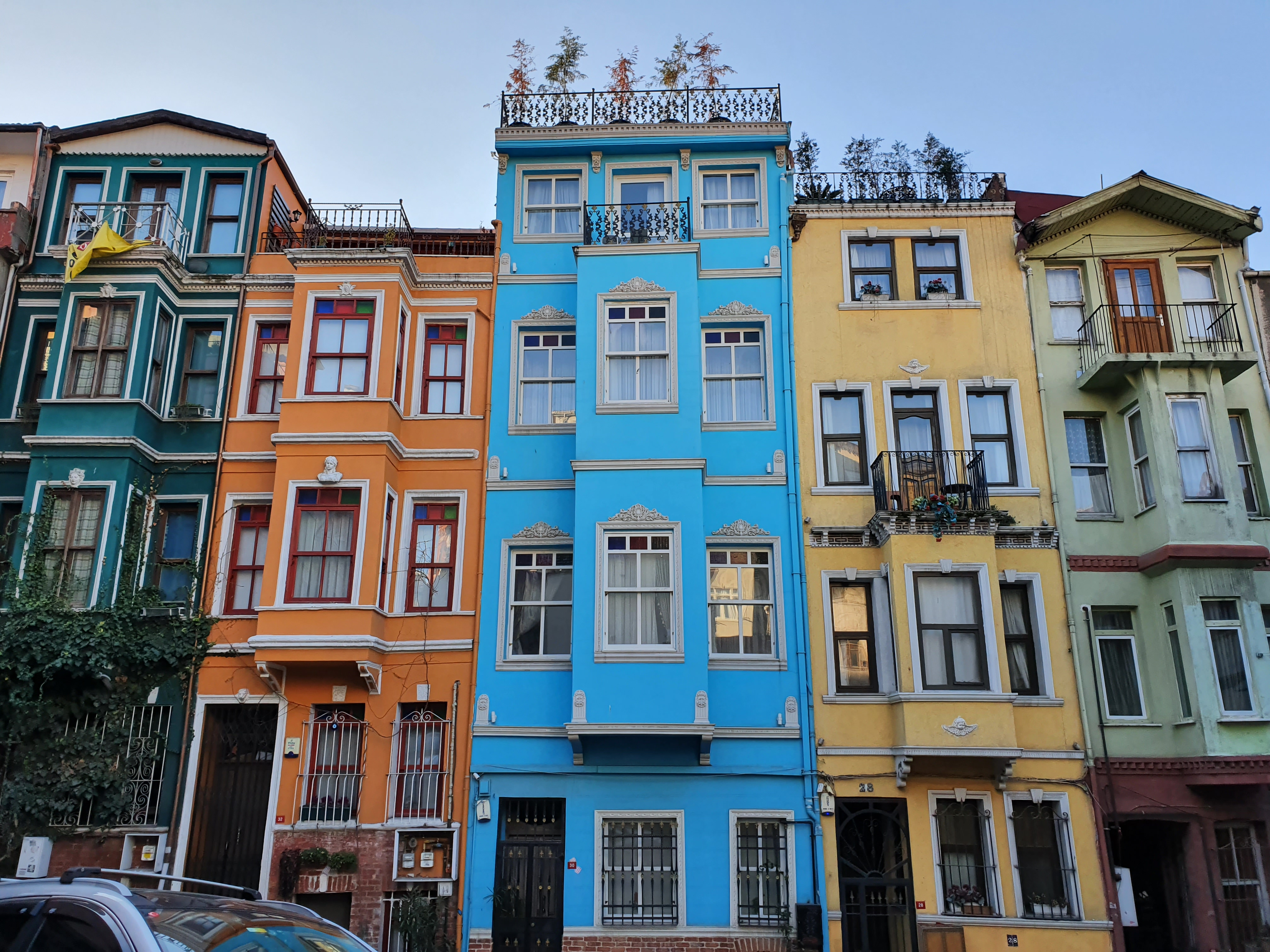
- Balat – colourful houses in the historic center

- Location within Turkey Location within Istanbul
- Coordinates: 41°01′58″N 28°56′44″E
- Country: Turkey
- Province: Istanbul
- District: Fatih
- Population (2022): 11,656
- Time zone: UTC+3 (TRT)

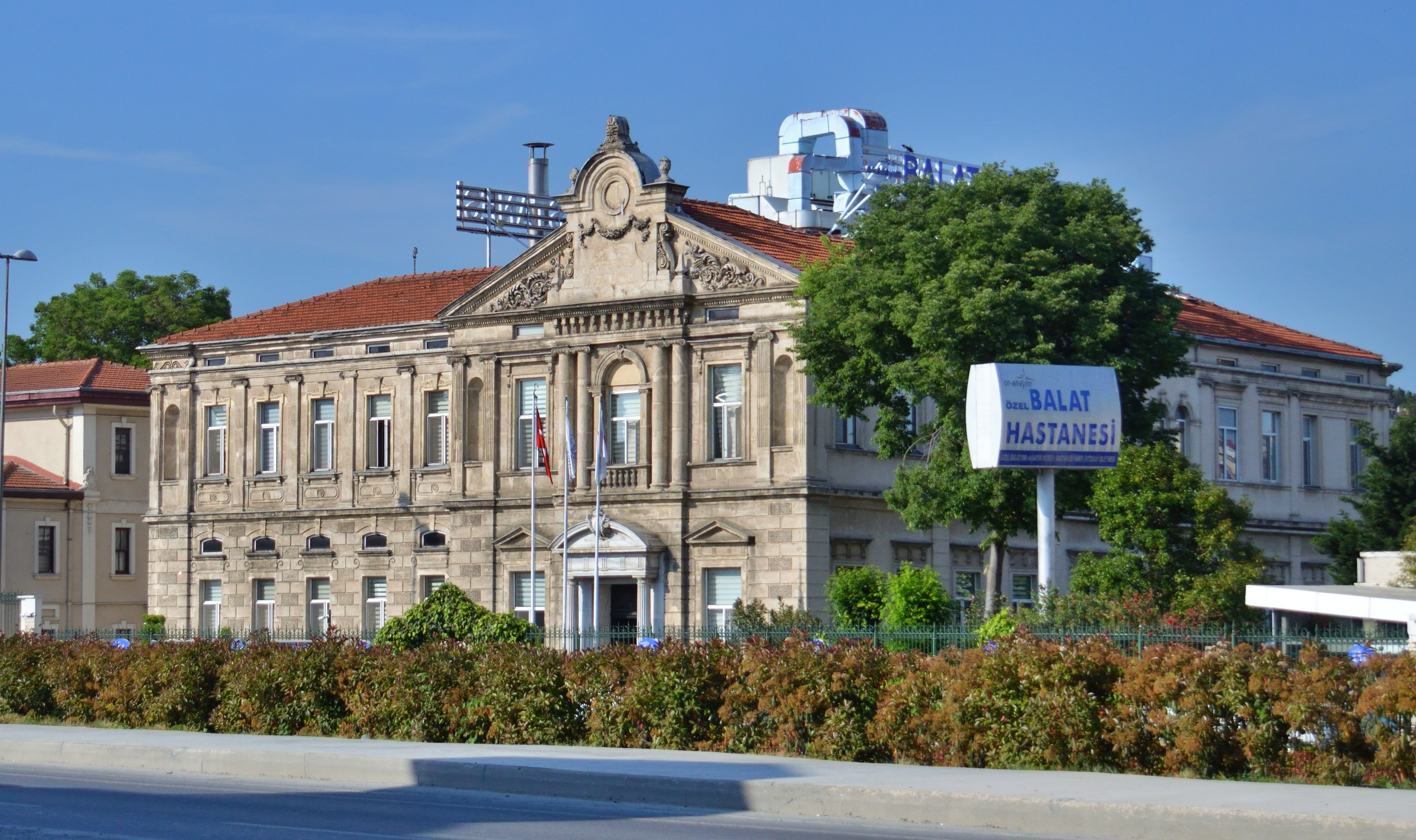
Or-Ahayim Hospital in Balat

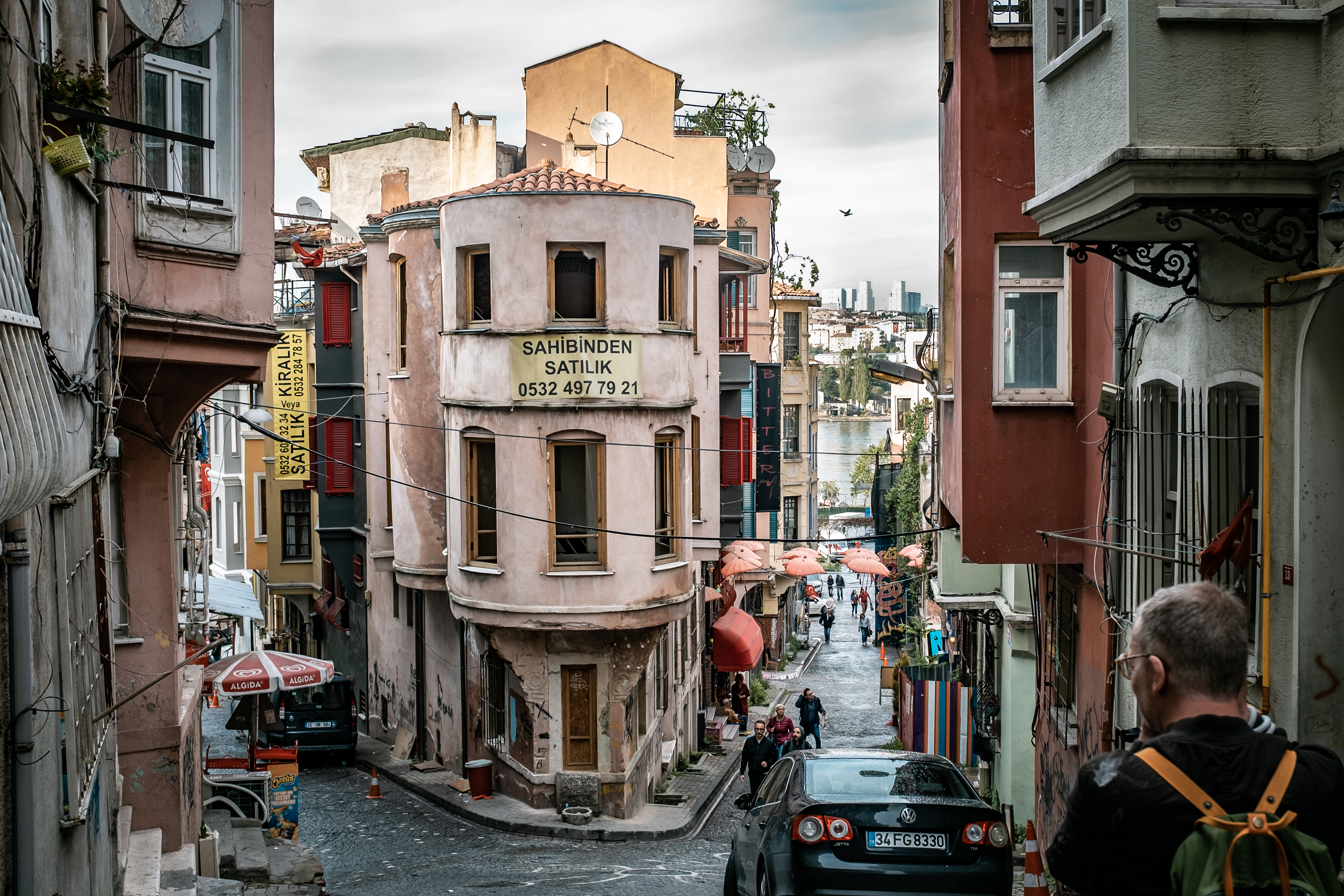
A historic street in Balat

Balat is a neighbourhood in the municipality and district of Fatih, Istanbul Province, Turkey. Its population is 11,656 (2022). It is in the old city on the European side of Istanbul, on the western shore of the Golden Horn, sandwiched between Fener and Ayvansaray. Historically, it was the center of the Jewish community in Istanbul.

The name Balat is probably derived from Greek palation (palace), from Latin palatium, after the nearby Palace of Blachernae.

As in neighbouring Fener, Balat's back streets are lined with small stone two and three-storey terraced houses and a few grander mansions. In the 2020s, Balat become one of the hottest parts of the city for tourism, including domestic tourism, and many of the houses have been turned into cafes, restaurants and accommodation for visitors. Many of the houses have been repainted in bright colours to give a distinctive feel to the neighbourhood.

Balat is a stop on the T5 tramline connecting it to Cibali and the small bus terminal (for services to Anatolia) in Alibeyköy. The Golden Horn ferries also stop here, connecting Balat to Üsküdar, Karaköy, Kasımpaşa, Fener, Ayvansaray, Hasköy, Sütlüce and Eyüp.

== History ==
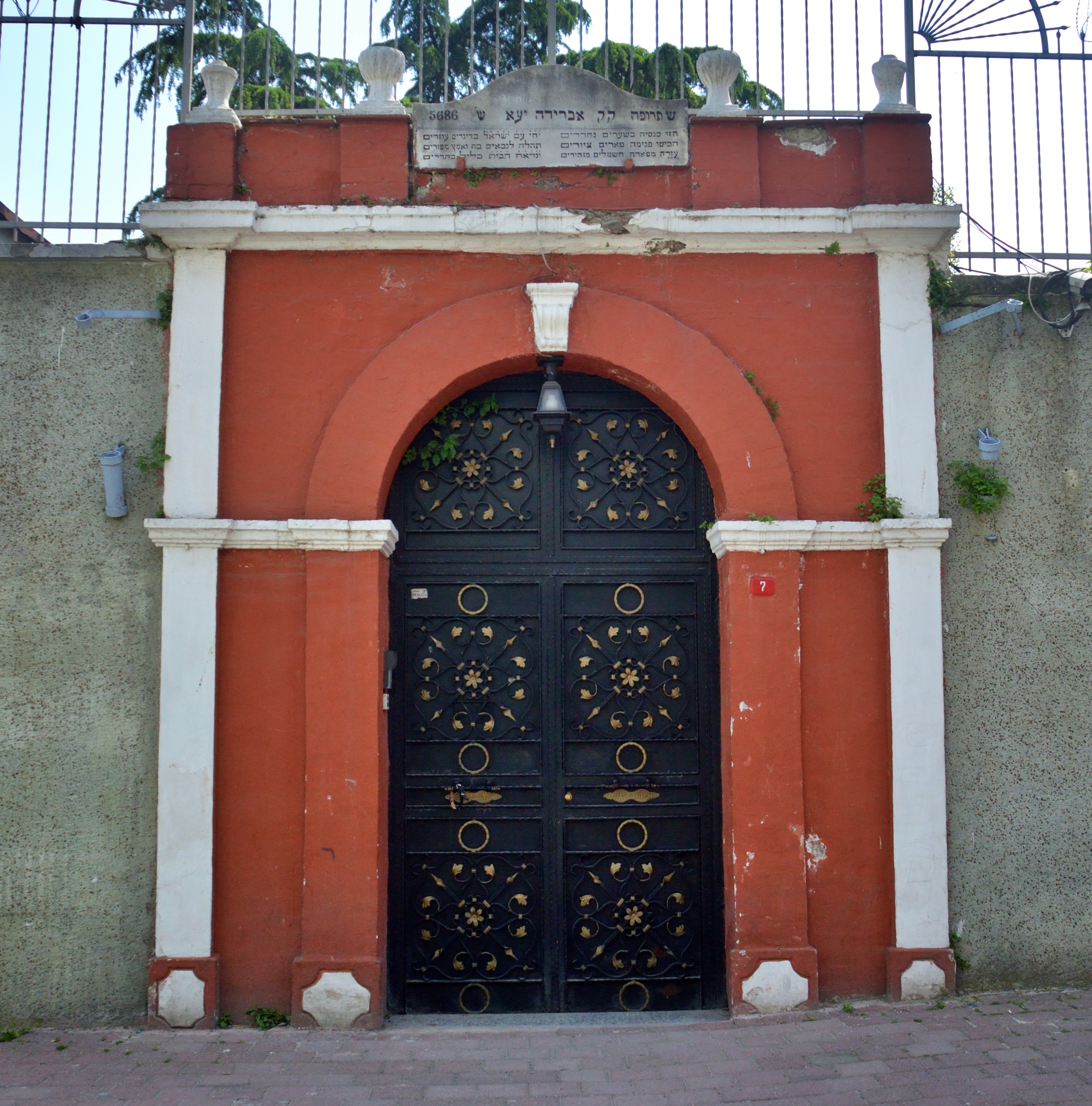
Gate of Ahrida Synagogue

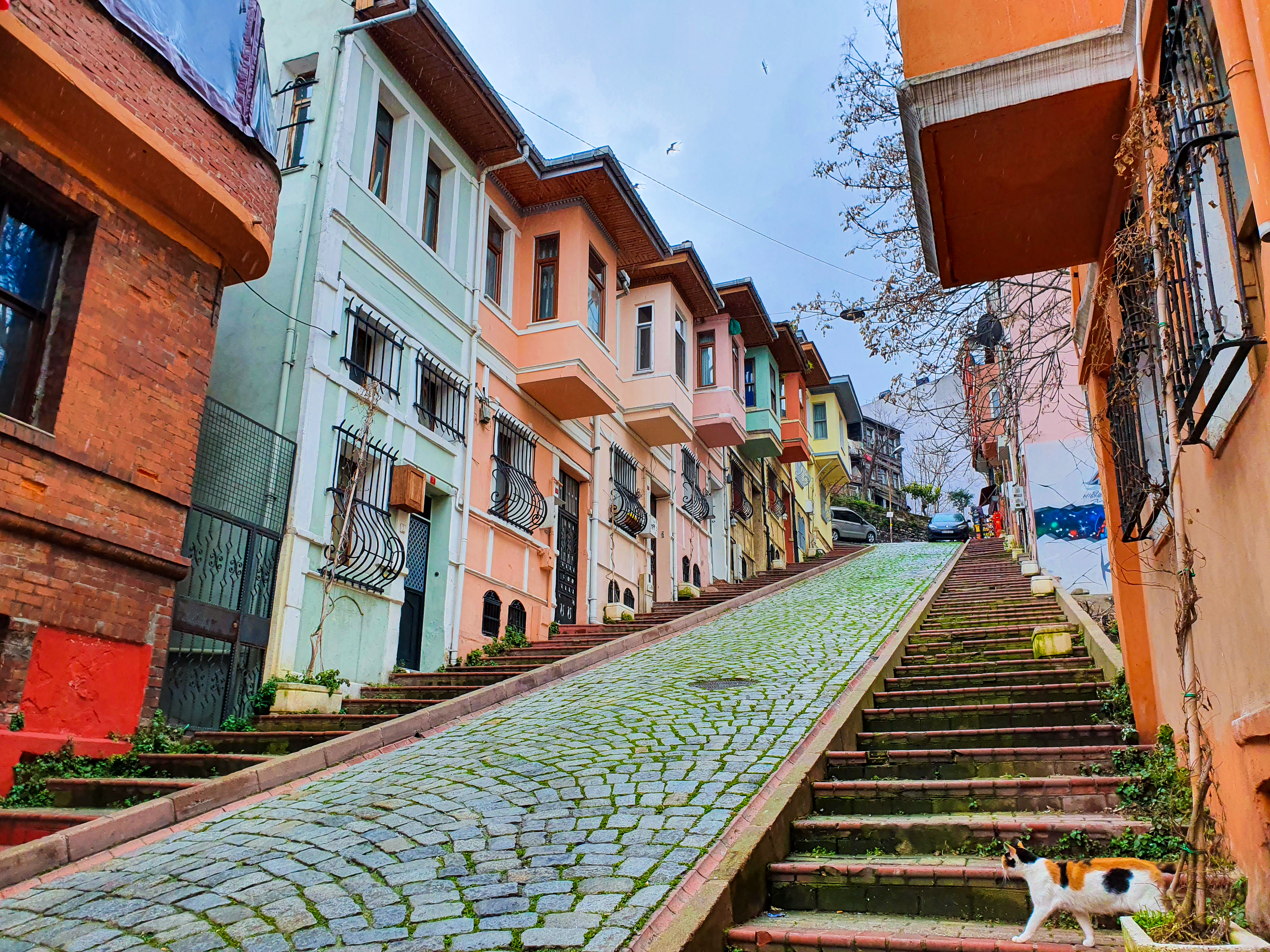
Pierre Lotti Hill in Balat

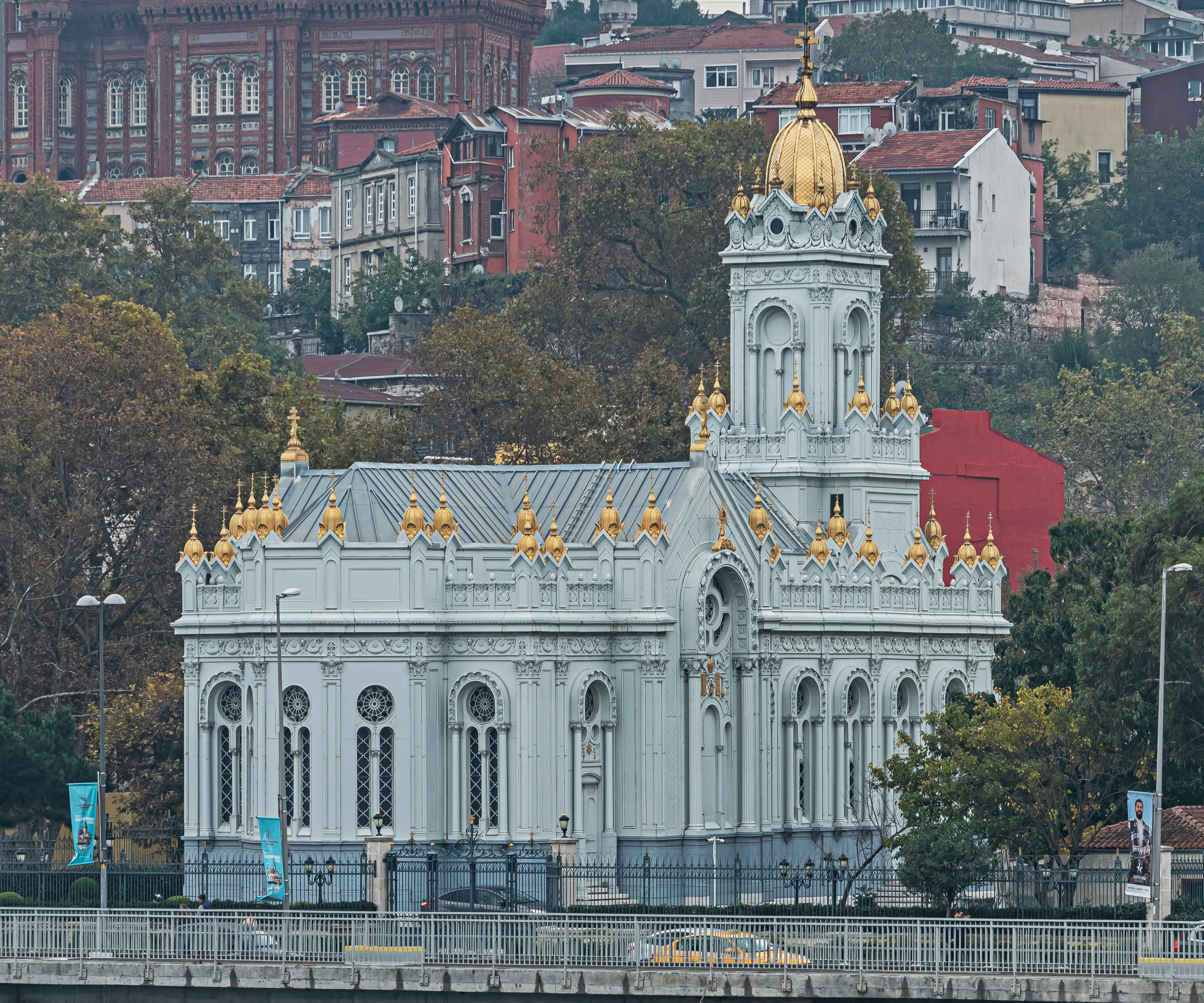
Church of St. Stephen of the Bulgars, also known as the Bulgarian Iron Church.

Balat first became home to a large Jewish population in the late 15th century, when Sultan Bayezid II offered citizenship to Jews and Muslims fleeing the Inquisition in Spain and Africa, and the 1492 Alhambra Decree. At its peak, Balat was home to 18 synagogues, though only three are still in use today: Ahrida Synagogue, Istipol Synagogue and Yanbol Synagogue. Opened in 1899 and designed by Gabriel Tedeşci, Or-Ahayim Hospital was originally set up to serve Balat's Jewish population, but now serves the general public.

Balat was also home to a wide variety of ethnicities, cultures and religions. The famous Bulgarian Iron Church is located in the district, and there was traditionally a sizeable Armenian population too. Its proximity to St. George's Church and the Ecumenical Patriarchate of Constantinople in neighbouring Fener also meant that there was a large Greek Orthodox (Rûm) population. However, Balat today is overwhelmingly Muslim, with most minority populations having left the district or been forced to leave as a result of the Armenian genocide, Greek genocide, anti-Greek riots and expulsions throughout the 20th century.

From the 17th century onwards European travellers recorded Balat as being particularly poor and unhygienic, although Marie-Christine Bornes-Varol has argued that their reports may not have been accurate reflections of Balat as a whole, since travellers' accounts were largely based on visits to Karabaş, the poorest part of Balat.

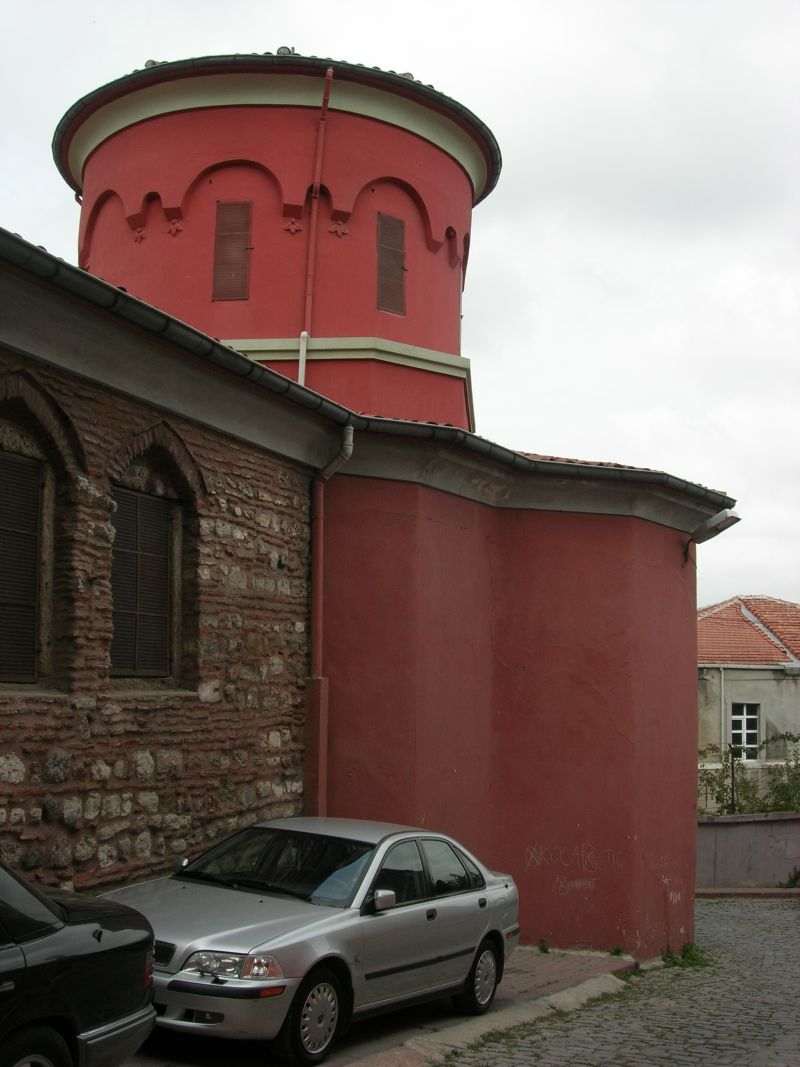
The Church of Saint Mary of the Mongols

In 1810 Balat's Jews attacked the Janissary patrols in the neighbourhood, claiming that they were defending themselves against mistreatment by the local Janissary unit; those who were caught after the attack were executed.

In 1985, Balat was inscribed on the UNESCO World Heritage List as one of the Historic Areas of Istanbul, and in the late 1990s and early 2000s was the subject of a number of controversial renovation and revitalisation projects.

=== Historical Fires in Balat ===
Balat, one of Istanbul's historic neighborhoods, has witnessed many major fires throughout its history. These fires have shaped the neighborhood's structure over time:

- 1303 - Byzantine Period: The first major fire in Balat is recorded.
- 1510 - Ottoman Period: A large fire that started in a neighborhood and spread from Balat to Bahçekapı caused around 800 shops burned.
- 1639 - Fire Outside the Balat Gate: A fire that began in a candle-making workshop spread quickly due to strong winds, reducing the Balat district to ashes by morning. The fire continued to Çukurbostan, destroying the area between Fener Gate and Çukurbostan.
- 1692 - Fire Near Ferrah Kethuda Mosque: Starting in a cotton carding shop, the fire spread to Kesmekaya, destroying 1500 houses and shops, causing significant damage.
- 1729 - Fire in a Greengrocer's Shop Outside Balatkapı: The fire quickly spread over a large area due to strong winds. This disaster caused about one-eighth of Istanbul to be reduced to ashes. It extended from Fener Gate to Ayvansaray, severely affecting the surroundings of the Tekfur Palace.
- After these fires, 10 different fires occurred in the years 1743, 1746, 1780, 1812, 1866, 1868, 1892, 1911, 1967, and 1968, causing many losses of life and property.

== Attractions ==
The Church of St. Stephen of the Bulgars (AKA The Iron Church) stands on the shore of the Golden Horn where Fener runs into neighbouring Balat and is unique in that it was built entirely from prefabricated iron shipped down the Danube from Vienna and then reconstructed in Balat. It is the base for the Bulgarian Exarchate which broke away from the Orthodox Patriarchate in 1872. The church reopened after complete restoration in 2018.

Originally founded in the 15th century to serve a congregation of Jews from Ohrid, the Ahrida Synagogue contains a beautiful wooden bema (pulpit) and is historically important because it was where Sabbetai Tsvi announced his breakaway beliefs in 1666. Originally built in the 15th century for a congregation of Jews from Bulgaria, the Yanbol Synagogue has a particularly beautiful painted ceiling.

The house of historian Dimitri Cantemir (1673-1723) sits to the right of the steps that form Merdivenli Mektep Sokak. Although it has been restored it has since been absorbed into the grounds of a cafe.

The Church of Hagios Georgios Metochi is enclosed in a large compound off Vodina Caddesi and is usually open on the St George's Day. The original church on the site was probably a chapel for one of the governors of Wallachia but by the 17th century it had apparently become a metochion, closely associated with the Church of the Holy Sepulchre in Jerusalem. It was here that the so-called Archimedes Palimpsest was discovered in the early 20th century when a scholar revealed that seven books written by the Greek mathematician Archimedes had been reused to create a prayer-book in the 13th century. Three of them are not known in any other copies.

The large Armenian Church of Surp Hreşdagabed (Church of the Archangels) was built over an ayazma (sacred spring) in the 16th century but rebuilt in the 18th century. Its 19th-century school building now serves as a warehouse used by the city's rubbish collectors. In his travel book Dervish, the journalist Tim Kelsey described the joint Muslim and Christian gathering that used to take place here on one day of the year when sheep and cockerels were sacrificed in hope of a miracle that would heal a disabled member of the community, an event that no longer occurs.

The Ferruh Kethüda Mosque is a minor work of Mimar Sinan (1562) which contains examples of Tekfur Sarayı tiles around its mihrab. The Balat religious court used to convene in its grounds.

The wrecked Sea Walls of Constantinople cut Balat off from the Golden Horn. On the seaward side a plaque memorialises the point in the walls when Sultan Mehmet II's troops poured over the walls on 23 April 1453 during the battle that culminated in the Conquest of Istanbul.

There are several other rarely used Greek Orthodox churches in Balat including the Church of Hagios Ioannis Prodromos (St John the Baptist) which was closely linked to the St Catherine's Monastery in the Sinai Desert in Egypt.

Cafes and cats are a regular attraction in Balat, along with the working-class shops and small factories scattered throughout the neighborhood.

== See also ==
- Ahrida Synagogue of Istanbul
- Yanbol Synagogue
- Karataş, Izmir
- Bulgarian St. Stephen Church
