= Yanbol Synagogue =

Synagogue in Istanbul, Turkey

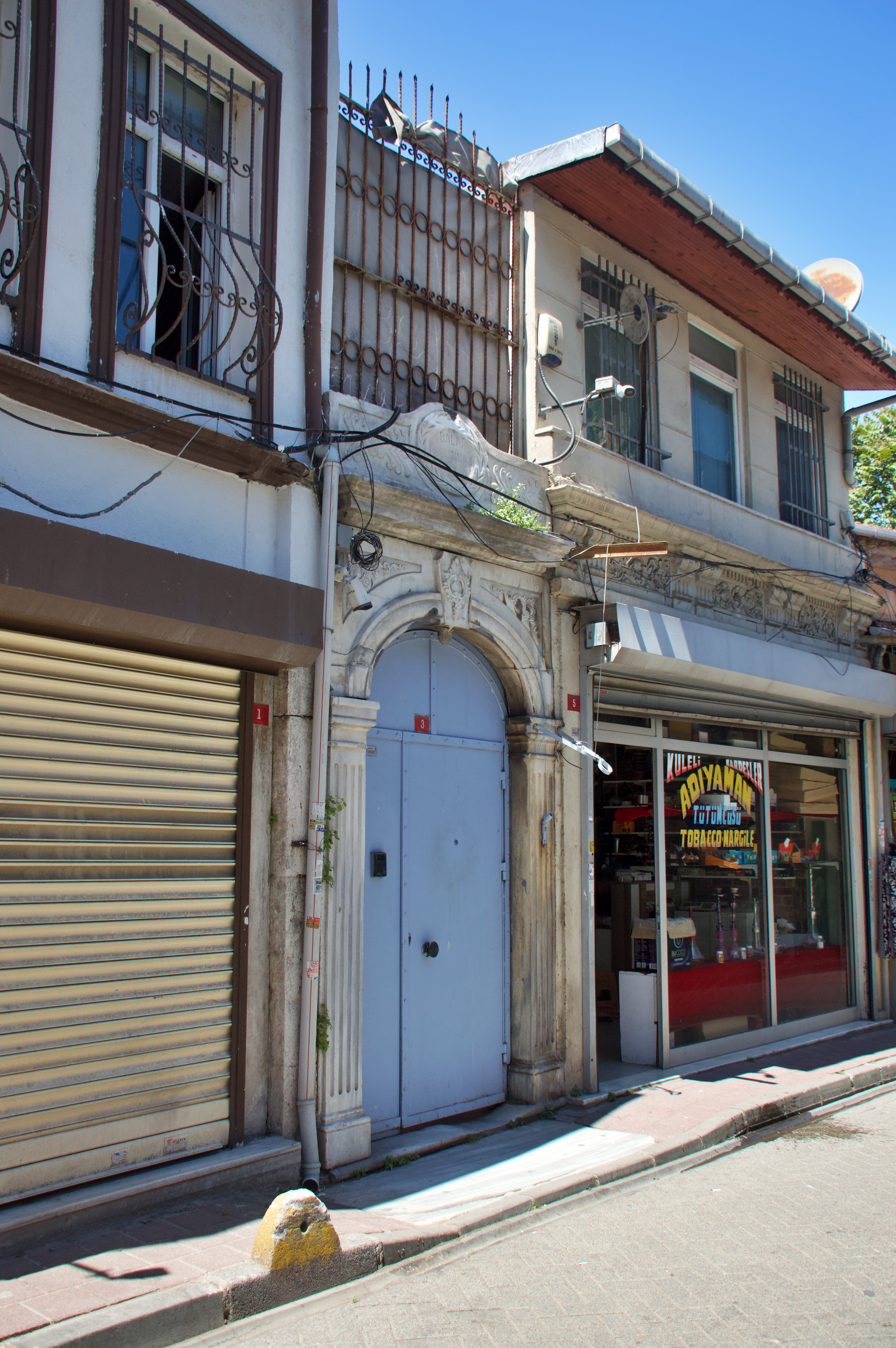
- Entrance to the synagogue, in 2022

- Location of the synagogue in Istanbul

Religion
- Affiliation: Judaism
- Rite: Nusach Sefard
- Ecclesiastical or organisational status: Synagogue
- Status: Active

Location
- Location: Ayvansaray Mahallesi, Kürkçü Çeşmesi Sk, Istanbul, Istanbul Province
- Country: Turkey
- Coordinates: 41°01′59″N 28°56′43″E

Architecture
- Type: Synagogue architecture
- Completed: 18th century
- Materials: Stone

The Yanbol Synagogue, also known as the Bulgarian Synagogue, is a Jewish congregation and synagogue, located on Ayvansaray Mahallesi, Kürkçü Çeşmesi Sk, Istanbul, in the Istanbul Province of Turkey.

Established by Bulgarian Jews from the Bulgarian town of Yambol, the synagogue was constructed in the 18th century. However, it underwent repairs during the end of the 19th century. The synagogue is only open for Shabbat services due to a decrease in the Jewish community in the area.

The synagogue reopened in July 2025 after a two-year restoration.

== See also ==
- History of the Jews in Istanbul
- List of synagogues in Turkey
