= Cesare Biseo =

Italian painter (1843–1909)

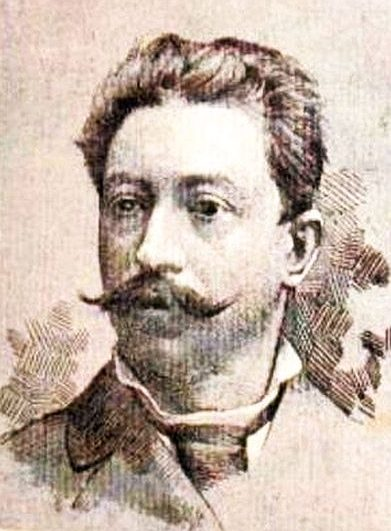
- Biseo, by an unknown artist
- Born: April 18, 1843; Rome, Papal States
- Died: January 25, 1909 (aged 65); Rome, Italy
- Known for: Painter, author

Signature
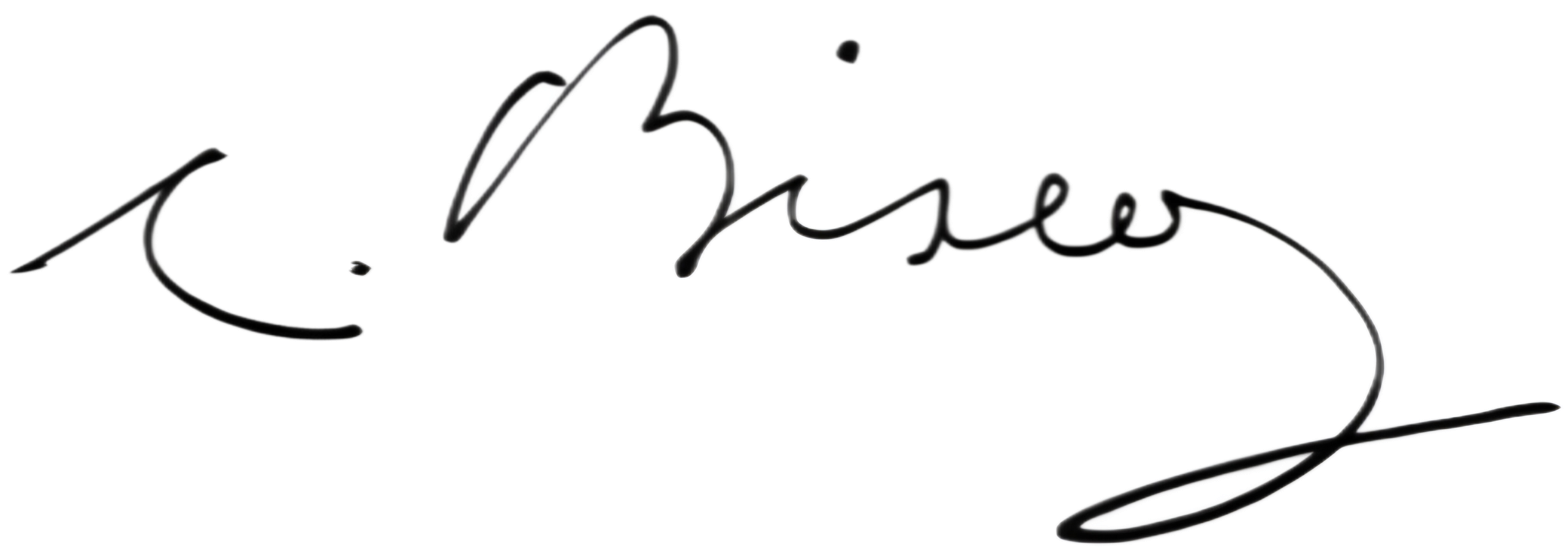

Cesare Biseo (April 18, 1843 – January 25, 1909) was an Italian painter, known primarily for his orientalist scenes.

== Biography ==
He was born to Giovanni Battista Biseo (1815-1865), a decorative and restorative painter from Brescia. He received his training from his father, and initially performed decorative work as well.

In 1870 or 1871, he was invited by Isma'il Pasha, the Khedive of Egypt, to decorate his palace and other public buildings in Alexandria with frescoes. He also worked in Cairo. This trip gave him subjects for many of his future works. He returned to North Africa, in the company of Stefano Ussi and Edmondo De Amicis, as part of the first Italian embassy to Morocco. Later, he illustrated two books by De Amicis: Morocco (1879) and Constantinople (1882), edited by the Treves Brothers of Milan, that helped shaped the public perception of the Muslim world.

His first exhibit was in 1877, in Naples. At the Esposizione di Belle Arti of Rome, in 1883, he exhibited a large canvas portraying the reception of the first ambassadors to Morocco. Three years later, he was part of the group that met the first Muslim delegation at the Quirinale. At the 1887 Mostra di Venezia, he exhibited a series of watercolors titled Ricordi de Cairo (Memories of Cairo). He was a member of the progressive artists' association, "In Arte Libertas".

== Selected paintings and illustrations ==
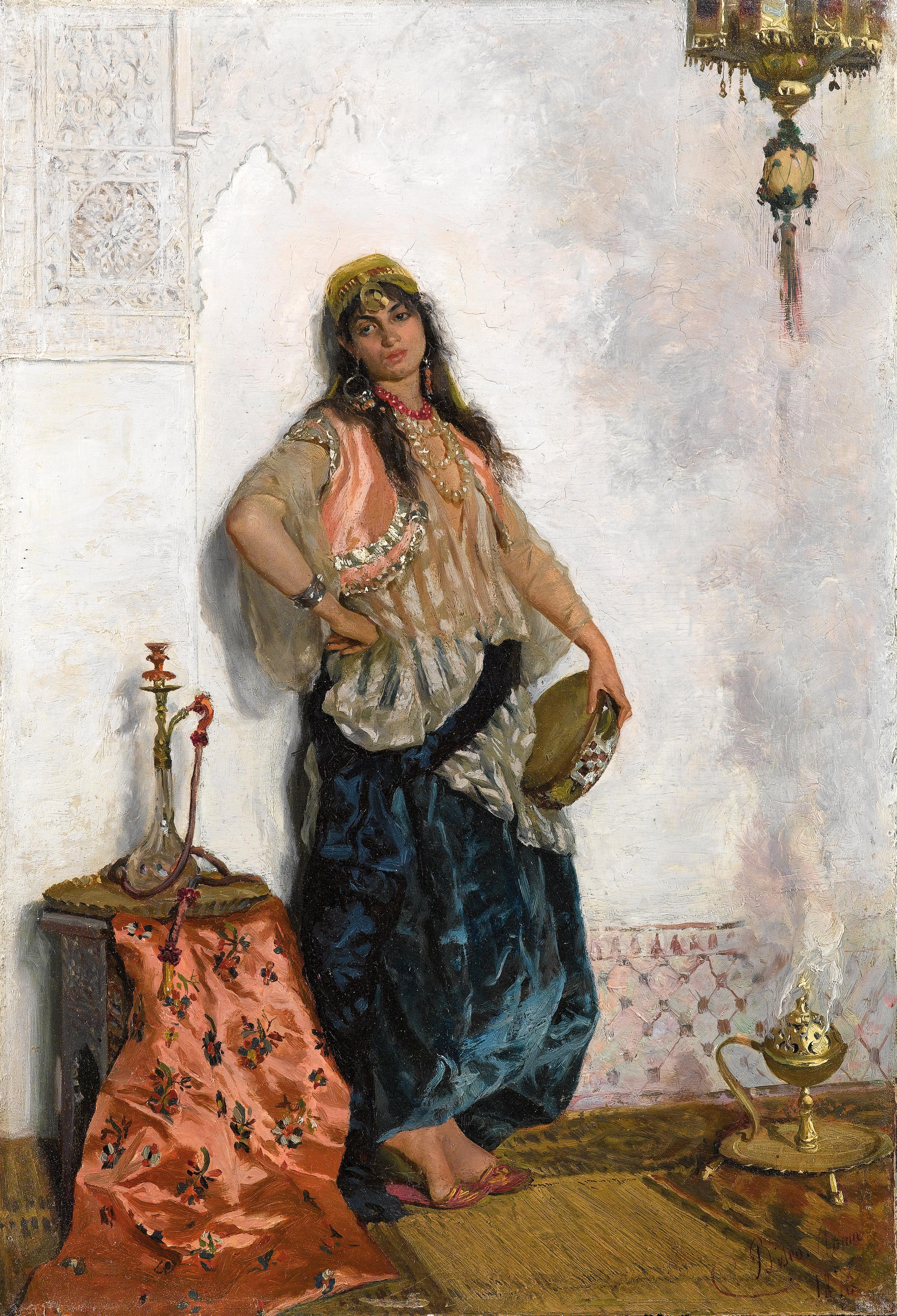
Oriental Dancer

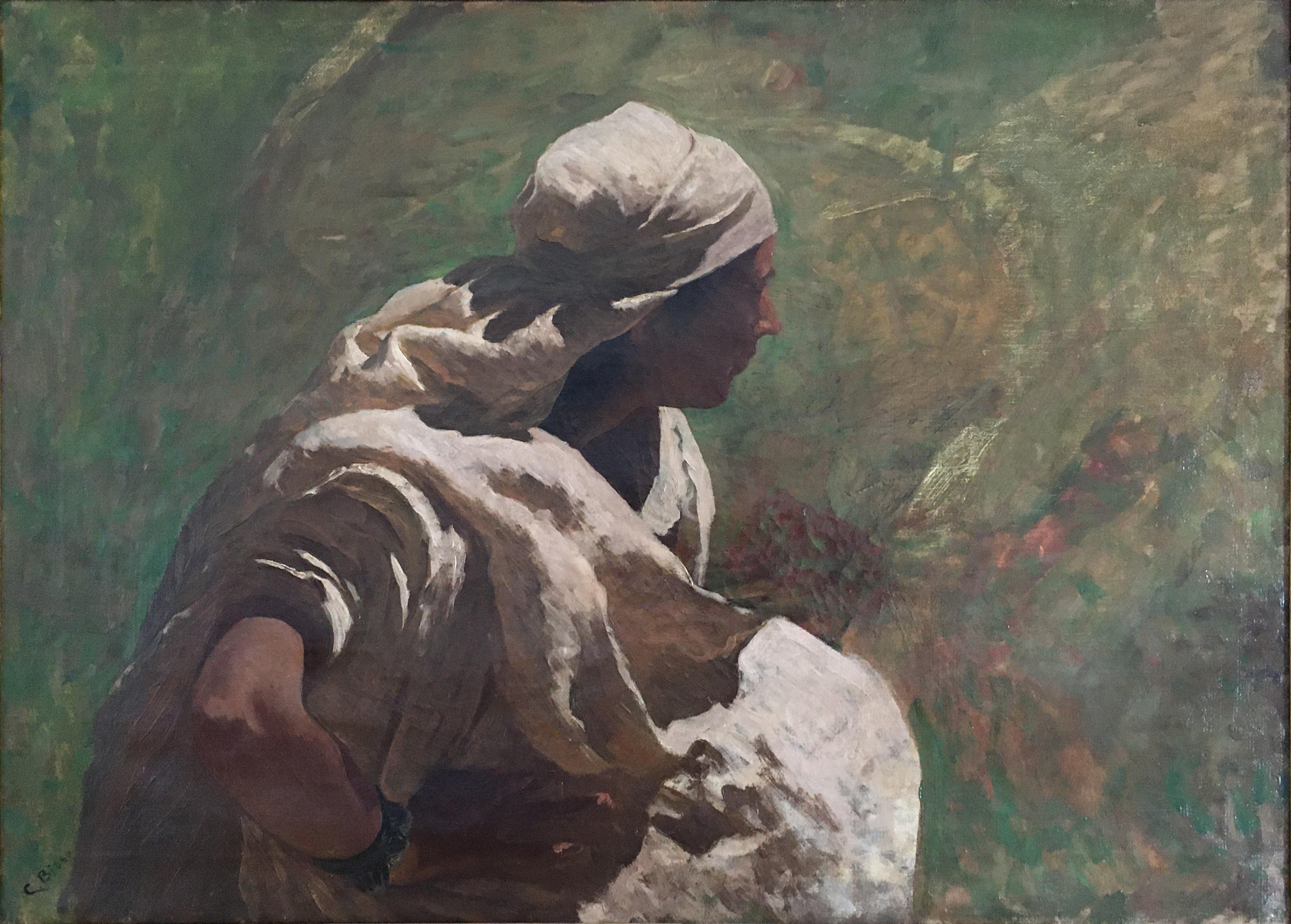
A Young Moroccan Man

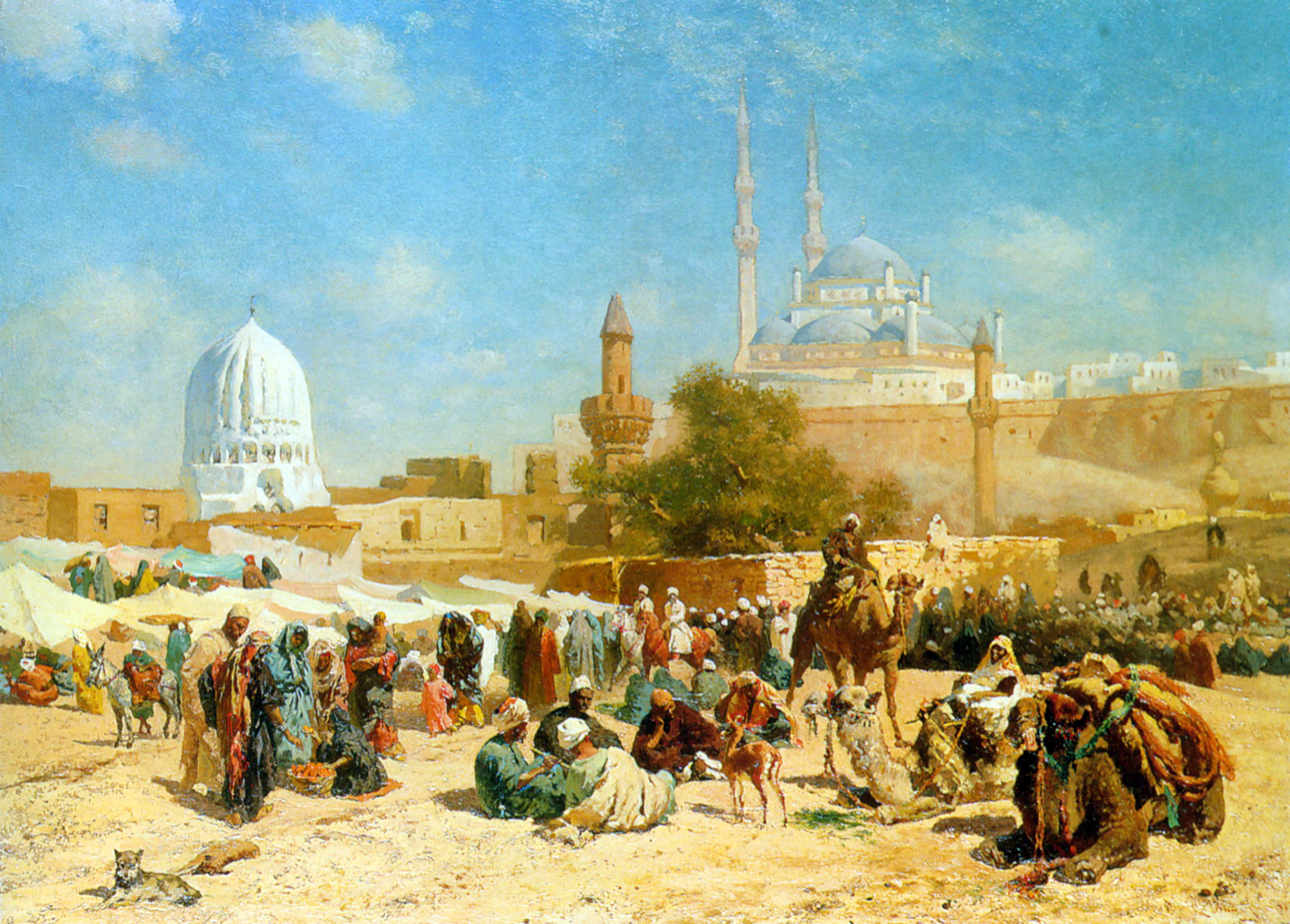
Outside Cairo

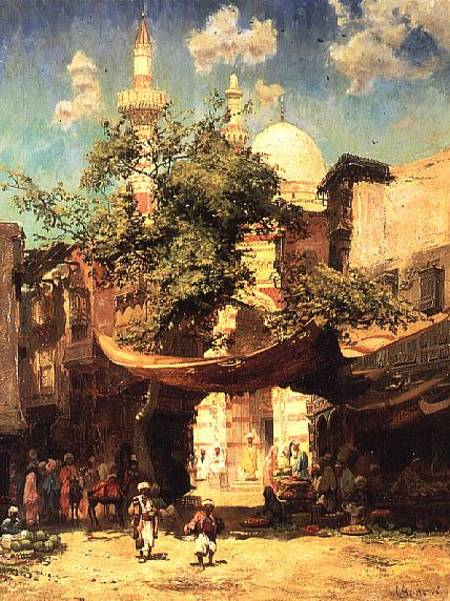
An Arab Market

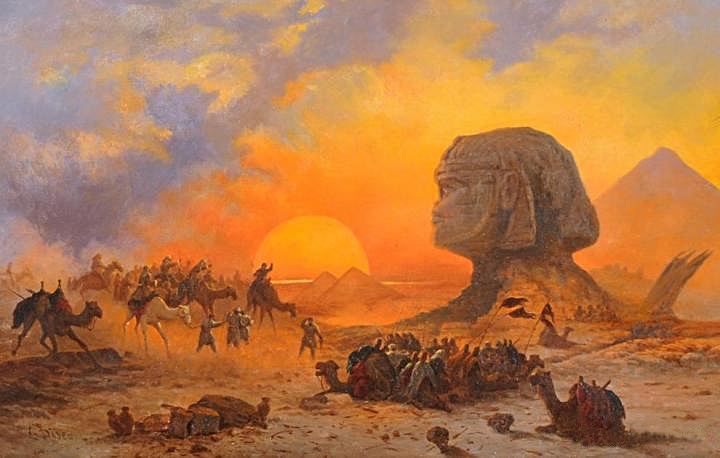
A Bedouin Caravan at the Feet of the Sphinx

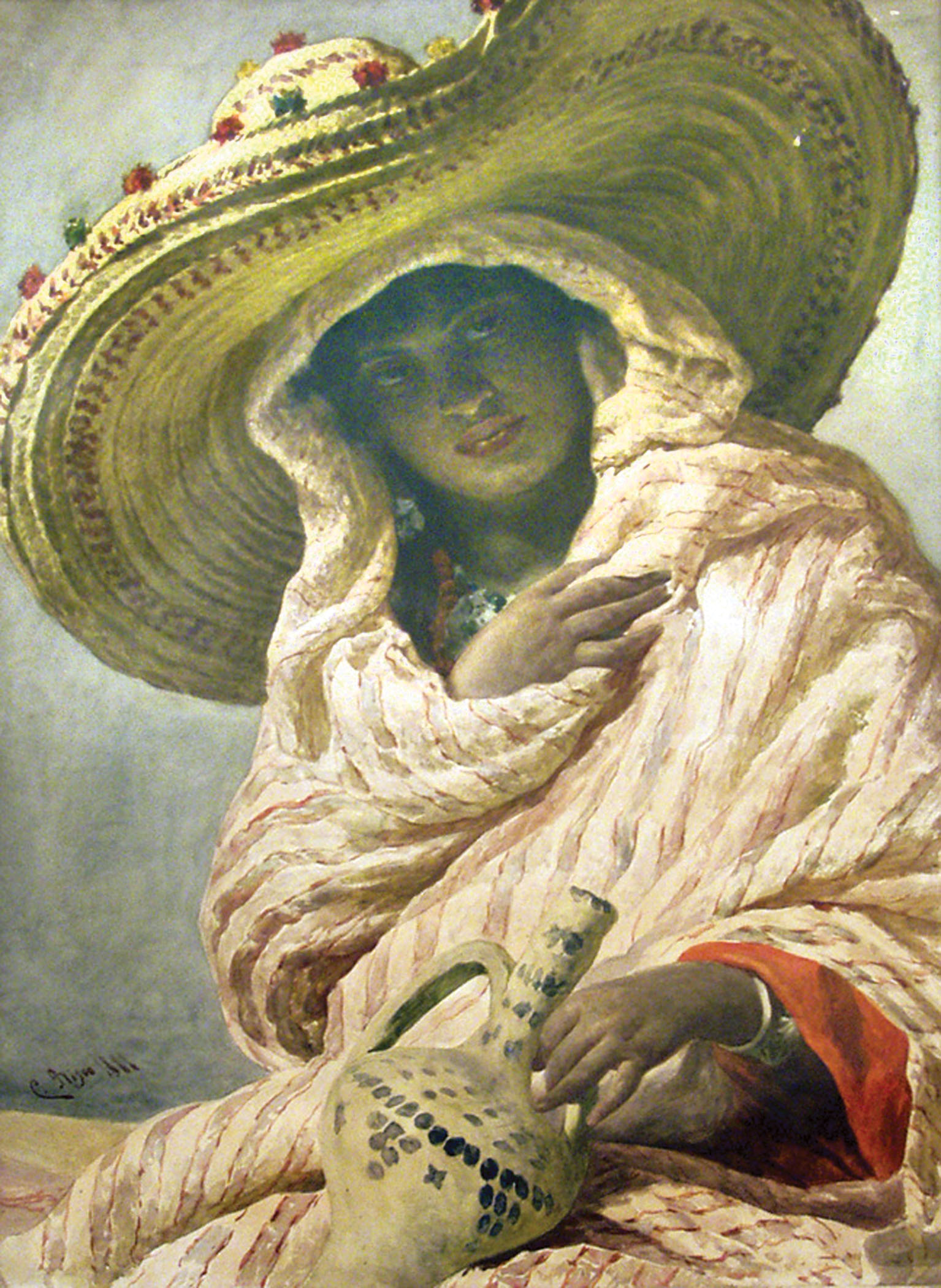
A Young
Moroccan Girl

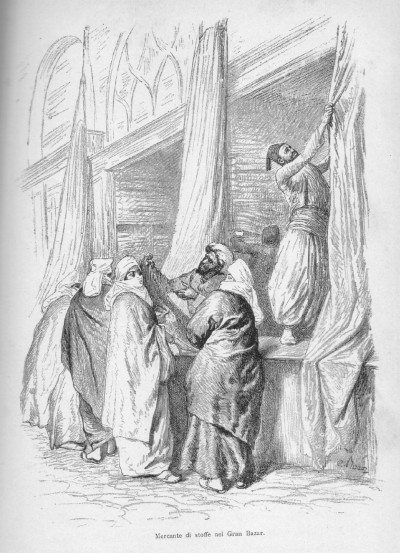
Dolap, from Constantinople

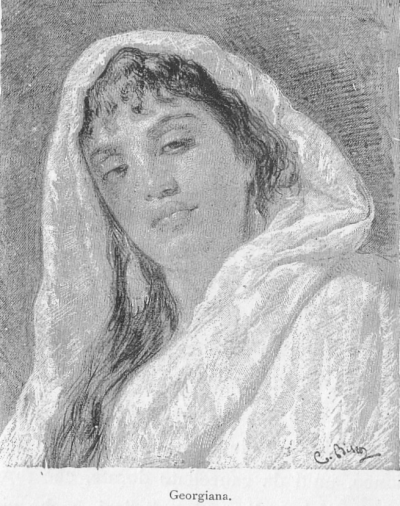
Georgian Woman, from Constantinople

== See also ==
- List of Orientalist artists
- Orientalism
