= Constantinople (De Amicis book) =

1877 travelogue by Edmondo de Amicis

1896 English translation by Caroline Tilton

1896 English translation, Volume I, by Maria Hornor Lansdale

Constantinople (Italian: Costantinopoli) is a non-fiction travelogue book by Edmondo de Amicis published in 1877 regarding Constantinople in the Ottoman Empire, now Istanbul.

== Release ==
The first edition was published in 1877. The original work had two volumes. Cesare Biseo illustrated an 1882 edition, and Alberto Brambilla of Sorbonne University wrote that this one "will help shape the European imagination towards Istanbul, and the Orient in general." Multiple translations were derived from the Biseo version.

In 2013 a new English translation by Stephen Parkin was released.

A Turkish translation under the title İstanbul was published by Pegasus Yayınları.

== Reception ==
Brambilla wrote that the publication of the book and its reception were evidence of Amicis being "one of the best-known Italian authors abroad". Orhan Pamuk has called De Amicis's work the best book written about Istanbul in the nineteenth century, while Umberto Eco stated that De Amicis' description of the city was the most cinematic, and himself used the guide when visiting Constantinople. Jason Goodwin has described the work as a real Victorian tour de force. PD Smith of The Guardian wrote that the book is "A wonderfully eloquent account".

William Armstrong in Hürriyet Daily News called it "An orientalist bore" with "annoyingly purple prose". Armstrong stated "it isn’t clear what distinguishes De Amicis’ memoir from the dozens of similar tomes written by intrepid Europeans at the time."
